= Shaiva Siddhanta =

Shaiva Hindu sect

Shaiva Siddhanta (Sanskrit: शैवसिद्धान्त, IAST: Śaiva-siddhānta) (Tamil: சைவ சித்தாந்தம் "Caiva cittāntam") is a form of Shaivism from South India and Sri Lanka that propounds a dualistic philosophy where the ultimate and ideal goal of a being is to become an enlightened soul through Shiva's grace. It draws primarily on the Tamil devotional hymns written by Shaiva saints from the 5th to the 9th century, known in their collected form as Tirumurai. Meykanda Devar (13th century) was the first systematic philosopher of the school. The normative rites, cosmology and theology of Shaiva Siddhanta draw upon a combination of Agamas and Vedic scriptures.

This tradition is thought to have been once practiced all over India, but the Muslim subjugation of North India restricted Shaiva Siddhanta to the south where it merged with the Tamil Shaiva movement expressed in the bhakti poetry of the Nayanars which was the first reaction against the nastika philosophies. Today, Shaiva Siddhanta has adherents predominantly in South India and Sri Lanka, and in a Tantrayana syncretised form in Indonesia (as Siwa Siddhanta).

The Tamil compendium of devotional songs known as Tirumurai, the Shaiva Agamas and "Meykanda" or "Siddhanta" Shastras, form the scriptural canon of Tamil Shaiva Siddhanta.

== Etymology ==
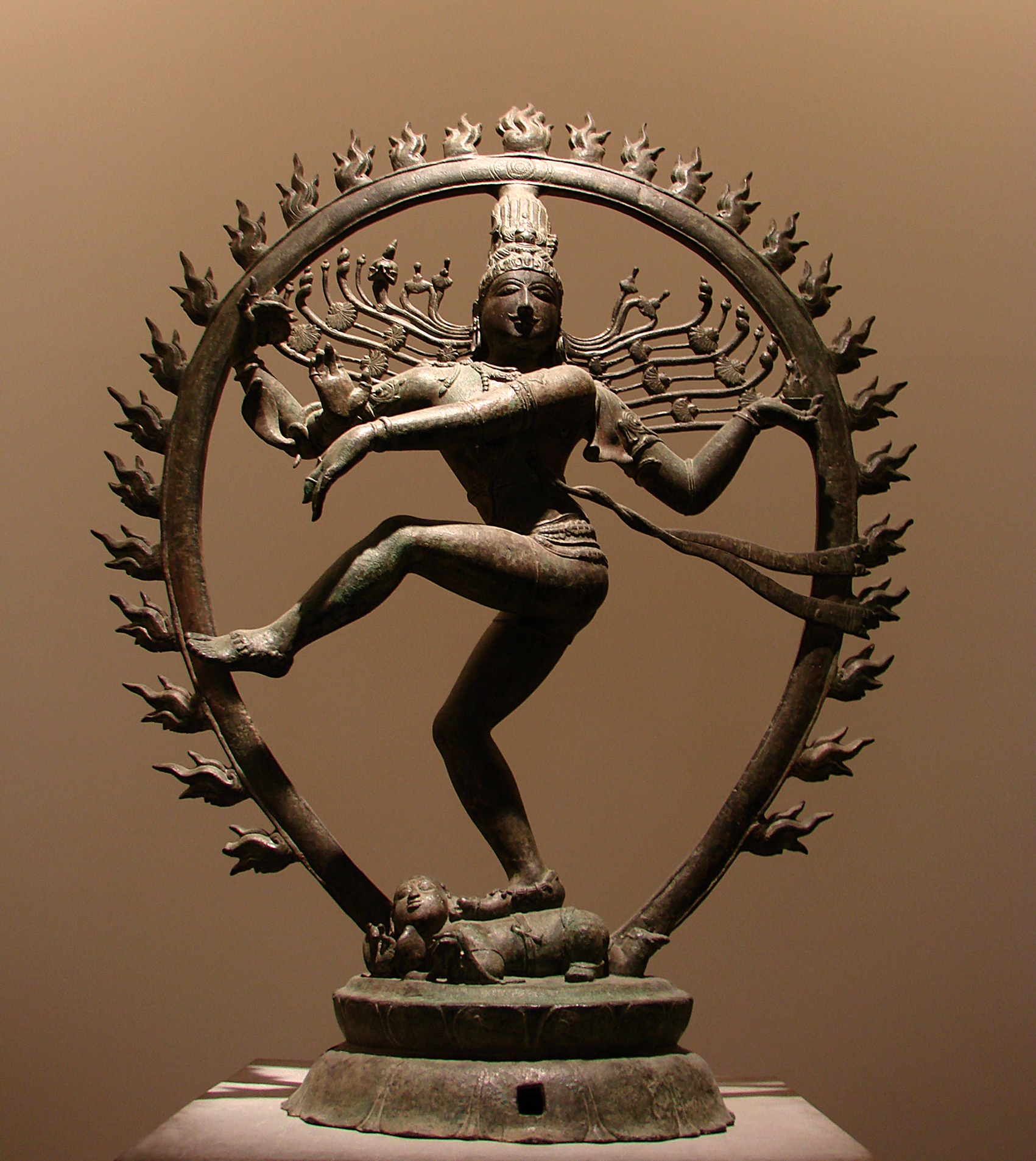
Nataraja, moderating Panchakritya, the supreme being of Siddhantism.

Monier-Williams gives the meaning of siddhanta as 'any fixed or established or canonical text-book or received scientific treatise on any subject ... as .. Brahma-siddhanta ब्रह्म-सिद्धान्त,... Surya-siddhanta, etc.

Karen Pechilis defines the term Shaiva Siddhanta as "the end of the knowledge of Shiva" signifying its culmination. Similar to Vedanta, which is the culmination of the Vedas, Shaiva Siddhanta makes a claim to be the authoritative interpretation of the knowledge of Shiva.

== History ==
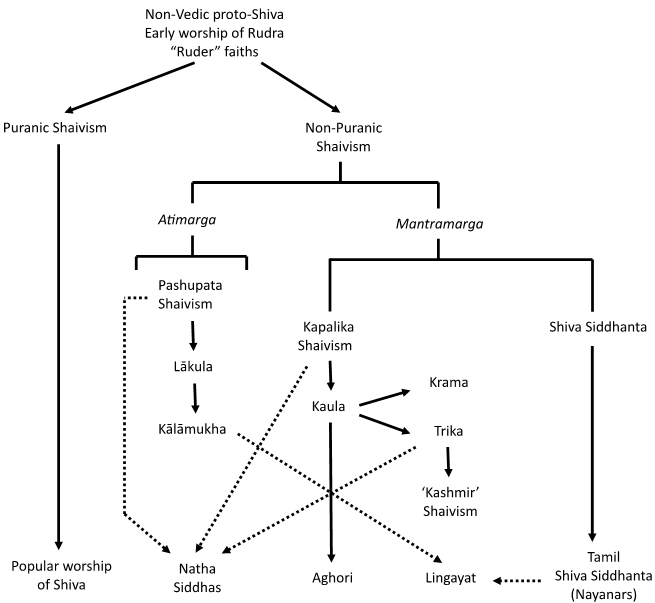
The development of various schools of Shaivism from pre-Vedic Shiva and early worship of Rudra.

=== Origins and early influences ===
Shaiva Siddhanta's original form is uncertain. Some hold that it originated as a monistic doctrine, espoused by Kashmiri northern shaivites (date unknown). South India is another theorized location of origin, where it was most prevalent. It seems likely to others, however, that the early Śaiva Siddhānta may have developed somewhere in India, as a religion built around the notion of a ritual initiation that conferred liberation. Such a notion of liberatory initiation appears to have been borrowed from a Pashupata (pāśupata) tradition. At the time of the early development of the theology of the school, the question of monism or dualism, which became so central to later theological debates, had not yet emerged as an important issue.

==== Kashmiri origins or influences ====
Siddhas such as Sadyojyoti (c. 7th century) are credited with the systematization of the Siddhanta theology in Sanskrit. Sadyojyoti, initiated by the guru Ugrajyoti, propounded the Siddhanta philosophical views as found in the Rauravatantra and Svāyambhuvasūtrasaṅgraha. He may or may not have been from Kashmir, but the next thinkers whose works survive were those of a Kashmirian lineage active in the 10th century: Rāmakaṇṭha I, Vidyākaṇṭha I, Śrīkaṇṭha, Nārāyaṇakaṇṭha, Rāmakaṇṭha II, Vidyākaṇṭha II. Treatises by the last four of these survive. King Bhoja of Gujarat (c. 1018) condensed the massive body of Siddhanta scriptural texts into one concise metaphysical treatise called the Tattvaprakāśa.

==== Tamil bhakti (7th-9th c.) ====
Om symbol Tirumurai Om symbol in Tamil
The twelve volumes of Tamil Śaiva hymns of the sixty-three Nayanars
Parts	Name	Author
1,2,3	(Tevaram) Thirukkadaik Kaappu	Sambandar
4,5,6	Tevaram	Thirunavukkarasar
7	(Tevaram) Thiruppattu	Sundarar
8	Thiruvasakam & Thirukkovaiyar	Manickavasagar
9	Thiruvisaippa & Thirupallandu	Various
10	Thirumandhiram	Thirumular
11	Saiva Prabandham	Various
12	Periya Puranam	Sekkizhar
Paadal Petra Sthalam
Paadal Petra Sthalam
Rajaraja I
Nambiyandar Nambi

From the 5th to the 8th century CE Buddhism and Jainism had spread in Tamil Nadu before a forceful Shaiva bhakti movement arose. Between the 7th and 9th centuries, pilgrim saints such as Sambandar, Appar, Sundarar 63 nayanmars used songs of Shiva's greatness to refute concepts of Buddhism and Jainism. Manikkavacakar's verses, called Tiruvacakam, are full of visionary experience, divine love and urgent striving for truth. The songs of these four saints are part of the compendium known as Tirumurai which, along with the Vedas, Shaiva Agamas, and the Meykanda Shastras, are now considered to form the scriptural basis of the Śaiva Siddhānta in Tamil Nadu. It seems probable that the Tirumurai devotional literature was not, however, considered to belong to the Śaiva Siddhānta canon at the time when it was first composed: the hymns themselves appear to make no such claim for themselves.

Tirumular (8th c. CE?), an aide of the prime Sangam age Vedic rishi Agastya, is considered to be the propounder of the term Siddhanta and its basic tenets in his magnum opus.

The Bhakti movement should not be exaggerated as an articulation of a 'class struggle'; there is nevertheless a strong sense against rigid structures in the society.

=== Formulation and sytematisation (12th-15th c.) ===
The culmination of a long period of systematisation of its theology appears to have taken place in Kashmir in the 10th century, the exegetical works of the Kashmirian authors Bhatta Narayanakantha and Bhatta Ramakantha being the most sophisticated expressions of this school of thought. Their works were quoted and emulated in the works of 12th-century South Indian authors, such as Aghorasiva and Trilocanasiva. The theology they expound is based on a canon of Tantric scriptures called Siddhantatantras or Shaiva Agamas. This canon is traditionally held to contain twenty-eight scriptures, but the lists vary, and several doctrinally significant scriptures, such as the Mrgendra, are not listed. In the systematisation of the ritual of the Shaiva Siddhanta, the Kashmirian thinkers appear to have exercised less influence: the treatise that had the greatest impact on Shaiva ritual, and indeed on ritual outside the Shaiva sectarian domain, for we find traces of it in such works as the Agnipurana, is a ritual manual composed in North India in the late 11th century by a certain Somasambhu.

In the 12th century, Aghorasiva, the head of a branch monastery of the Amardaka order in Chidambaram, took up the task of formulating Shaiva Siddhanta. Strongly refuting monist interpretations of Siddhanta, Aghorasiva brought a change in the understanding of Siva by reclassifying the first five principles, or tattvas (Nada, Bindu, Sadasiva, Isvara and Suddhavidya), into the category of pasa (bonds), stating they were effects of a cause and inherently unconscious substances, a departure from the traditional teaching in which these five were part of the divine nature of God.

Aghorasiva was successful in preserving the rituals of the ancient Āgamic tradition. To this day, Aghorasiva's Siddhanta philosophy is followed by almost all of the hereditary temple priests (Sivacharya), and his texts on the Āgamas have become the standard puja manuals. His Kriyakramadyotika is a vast work covering nearly all aspects of Shaiva Siddhanta ritual, including the daily worship of Siva, occasional rituals, initiation rites, funerary rites, and festivals. This Aghora Paddhati of Shaiva Siddhanta is followed by the ancient gruhasta Adi Shaiva Maths of Kongu Nadu and the temple Sthanika Sivacharya priests of south India.

Meykandar (13th century) was the first systematic philosopher of the school in a dualistic dvaita Vedantic perspective. In Tamil Shaiva Siddhanta, the thirteenth century Meykandar, Arulnandi Sivacharya, and Umapati Sivacharya further spread Tamil Shaiva Siddhanta. Meykandar's twelve-verse Śivajñānabodham and subsequent works by other writers, all supposedly of the thirteenth and fourteenth centuries, laid the foundation of the Meykandar Sampradaya (lineage), which propounds a pluralistic realism wherein God, souls and world are coexistent and without beginning. Siva is an efficient but not material cause. They view the soul's merging in Siva as salt in water, an eternal oneness that is also twoness.

The Brahma Sutra Bhashya of Śrīkaṇṭhā (11th-15th c.) is a further agamic philosophical foundation of the philosophy in a Srauta Vedic Vedantic Shiva advaita perspective.

=== Early Modern Period ===
==== Sri Lanka ====
In the Sri Lankan Sinhalese society, king Rajasinha I of Sitawaka (r. 1581 to 1592) converted to Saiva Siddhantism, and made it the official religion during his reign, after a prolonged domination of Theravada Buddhism following the conversion of king Devanampiya Tissa. This Sinhalese Saiva Siddhanta led to the decline of Buddhism for the next two centuries until being revived by South East Asian orders aided by Europeans, but left vestiges in the Sinhalese society.

King Rajasinha arranged the marriage of his Tamil minister Mannamperuma Mohottala to a sister of a junior queen known as the "iron daughter" He converted to Shaiva Siddhanta He was reported to have settled Brahmans Adi Shaivas and Tamil Shaivite Velalars at significant Buddhist sites such as Sri Pada, etc. The Velala Gurukkals acted as religious mentors of the King and strengthened Shaiva Siddhantism at these centres. Under the advice of Mannamperuma Mohottala, he razed many Buddhist religious sites to the ground. Buddhism remained in decline thereafter until the formation of the Siam Nikaya and Amarapura Nikaya with the support of the Portuguese and Dutch East India Company respectively.

Traces of the era exist in temples like Barandi Kovila (Bhairava-andi kovil) in Sitawaka and the worship of other Shaivite deities by the Sinhalese, like the syncretic Natha deviyo, Sella kataragama and others.

In the continental south East Asian Ramayanas, Phra Isuan (from Tamilised Sanskrit Isuwaran) is considered the highest of gods, while Theravada Buddhism is the dominant philosophical religion. Here Shaiva Siddhanta is the practical religion while Theravada Buddhism is the philosophical overarch. In the Nusantaran Siwa Siddhanta, Siwa is syncretised with the Buddha in a Tantrayanic form called Siwa-Buda. A similar form is observed in the Chams of Vietnam where the community has diverged into the Shaiva Siddhantic Balamons and the tantrayanic acharyas (Cham: Acars) becoming the Bani Cham Muslims. This is due to the fact that the Indian Bhakti era philosophical and the subsequent royal Shaiva Siddhanta reaction against Buddhism failed to reach south east asia in which Theravada Buddhism, Tantrayana Buddhism and later Islam filled the role of philosophical Shaiva Siddhanta.

==== Tamil Nadu ====
Meanwhile in Tamil Nadu, after the Kalabhra interregnum, the Tamil states of the Pandyas and Pallavas reemerged, reviving the Saivite and Vaishnavite native religions. Further, the Saivite saint Sambandar is said to have theologically defeated 8,000 Sramanas with Buddhist names among them. When they started an insurrection, they were impaled by Koon Pandiyan at Samanatham near Madurai. Mahendravarman I under Appar, a Saivite saint retrieved and reclaimed the Sramana encroached monuments and wrote Mattavilasa Prahasana, a comic play on the heretical (non Vedic) sects of the time including Buddhism. Bhagavadajjukam by Baudhayana of the same reign ridiculed the Sramana sects within Hinduism, the sannyasins. These events are considered to be the ushering in of the Bhakti era in India which resulted in the routing of the nastika religion Buddhism and the near decimation of Jainism in India.

==== South-East Asia ====
In the Angkorian Khmer empire (802 to 1431), Buddhism was already dominant but because of some of khmer kings non Buddhist religion flourished for political reasons until Theravada Buddhism revived there and the subsequent fall of the empire's God-king hierarchy.

In Cham society (Vietnam) -due to kings only and not local people the Tantrayana divide resulted in the divergence of the society into the Shaivites becoming Balamon Hindus and tantrayanists converting into the Bani Cham Muslims.

In Majapahit nusantara (Java), Siwa Siddhanta syncretised into the Tantrayana Siwa-Buda portrayed by Nagarakretagama. It still survives in the Agama Hindu Dharma. This synthesis is portrayed by the Kakawin Sutasoma derived national motto of Indonesia: 'Bhinneka Tunggal Ika'.

=== Colonial era - Tamil exclusivist reform Saiva Siddhanta ===
The exclusive Tamil reformist Saiva Siddhanta are people living in a community faced with strong nationalist ideas. In that way their beliefs in a religious way and their beliefs in a political way were mostly intertwined. Maraimalai Adigal (1876-1950) and his religious belief in the Saiva Siddhanta, for example, were heavily influenced by the Tamil Nationalism and especially by the party of the Shivaistic Revivalist, which he and his mentor had a part in creating. In Adigals belief system you can see how the Saiva Siddhanta that he relies his core beliefs on is mixed with his and the Revivalists core political to a very an individual tamilic Saiva Siddhanta Tradition. For example, though the Saiva Siddhanta in itself is not anti-Brahmanic Adigal develop it into having that tendency. That way his religious teaching in the Saiva Siddhanta strengthens his pro-Tamil and pro-shivaism attitude. It helps him and the Revivalists to establish their idea of the "pure Tamil", by becoming a religious tradition not reliant on any ties to older traditions by becoming itself the oldest tradition.

This colonial new age movement was initiated by the Tamil purist nationalist Maraimalai Adigal. This school is followed by modern Maths dating from the colonial age likes of the Perur Adheenam (Circa 1895 initiate of the then Arasu Palli caste headed Mayilam Bommapuram Lingayat Adheenam) of Coimbatore which holds Lingayatism as the 'primeval' form of Shaiva Siddhantism. This modern sampradaya aims to 'rid' Shaiva Siddhantism of the two former earlier traditions which follow the Vedic and Agamic texts and Adi Shaivas thereby 'purifying' Saiva Siddhanta with the Dravidian movement related Tamil Nationalist undertones.

=== Saiva Siddhanta today ===
Saiva Siddhanta is practiced widely among the Saivas of southern India and Sri Lanka, especially by members of the Adi Shaivas, Kongu Vellalar, Vellalar and Nagarathar communities of South India. It has over 5 million followers in Tamil Nadu, and is also prevalent among the Tamil diaspora around the world. It has thousands of active temples predominantly in Tamil Nadu and also in places around the world with significant Tamil population and also has numerous monastic and ascetic traditions, along with its own community of priests, the Adishaivas, who are qualified to perform Agama-based Shaiva Temple rituals.

The Encyclopedia of Saiva Religion, a ten-volume Saivite publication released in 2013, documents 990 Saivite institutions of Saiva Siddhanta. While many emerged after the 19th century, traditional centers like Thiruvaduthurai Adheenam, Dharmapuram Adheenam, and Thiruppanandal Kasi Math, founded in the 16th and 17th centuries, remain influential.

Kumaragurupara Desikar, a Tamil Saivite poet says that Shaiva Siddhantha is the ripe fruit of the Vedanta tree. G.U. Pope, an Anglican Tamil Scholar, mentions that Shaiva Sidhantha is the best expression of Tamil knowledge.

Post colonial and contemporary movements like that of Bodhinatha Veylanswami's Shaiva Siddhanta Church have stressed upon reforming orthodox Shaiva Siddhanta of the pre-colonial era by initiating the non Shaivite born, both Indians and westerners. This movement also rejects animal sacrifices mentioned in the Siddhantic Vedic and Agamic scriptures.

== Texts ==
Pristine Shaiva Siddhanta draws primarily on the Tamil devotional hymns written by Shaiva saints from the 5th to the 9th century CE, known in their collected form as Tirumurai.

The texts revered by the southern Saiva Siddhanta are the Vedas; the twenty-eight Saiva Agamas; Shaiva Puranas; the two Itihasas which form the ritual basis of the tradition; the twelve books of the Tamil Saiva canon called the Tirumurai, which contains the poetry of the Nayanars; the Aghora Paddhati, a codified form of all the above and additionally the Saiva Siddhanta Shastras for the Meykandar denomination.

A widely quoted and often given classical status, anonymous verse in Tamil Saiva Siddhanta expresses the relationship between the Vedas, Agamas, and Tamil literature:

The Vedas are the cow; the true agamas are its milk; the Tamil sung by the four [the authors of the first eight books of the Tirumurai, i.e. Tevaram and Tiruvacakam] is its ghee; the essence of the book in Tamil [i.e. Sivagnana Botham] written by Meykatar of the famous Venney is the taste of the ghee of great knowledge

== Tenets ==
=== Ontological categories ===
Shaiva Siddhanta believes in three different categories, which are distinct from each other:

1. pati ("Lord"), is Siva himself and cause of emission, maintenance, re-absorption, concealment and grace.
2. paśu ("Soul"), is individual Soul, distinct from Siva, but bound because of impurities.
3. pāśa ("Bond"), the three impurities - anava (ego), karma (deed) and maya (delusion).

The soul gains experience through its action (rituals), which removes the three impurities, but the liberation is realized only by the grace of Lord Siva.

=== Four stages ===
According to Shaiva Siddhanta texts, there are four progressive stages of Śiva bhakti for a path to attain moksha:

1. dāsamārga, offering service to devotees of Siva in different ways such as cleaning temple, weaving flower garlands for the image of Siva, praising Lord Siva.
2. satputramārga, a true son's way, offering personal devotion by preparing pūjā and performing meditation.
3. sahamārga, offering devotion by practicing yoga.
4. sanmārga, the way of truth and reality and the highest way, offering devotion by knowledge of God, experiencing the bliss of liberation and becoming one with God.

=== Influence of the six orthodox darśanas ===
While Shaiva Siddhanta is fundamentally an Agamic and theistic tradition, its scholastic development between the 9th and 13th centuries CE shows deep engagement with the six classical schools of Hindu philosophy (Ṣaḍdarśanas): Nyaya, Vaisheshika, Sankhya, Yoga, Mimamsa, and Vedanta. Theologians such as Sadyojyoti, Aghora Sivacharya, and Meykandar drew selectively from these traditions to articulate a robust metaphysical framework and refine the epistemological foundations of the Siddhanta system.

== Monastic orders ==
Three monastic orders were instrumental in Shaiva Siddhanta's diffusion through India; the Amardaka order, identified with one of Shaivism's holiest cities, Ujjain, the Mattamayura order, in the capital of the Chalukya dynasty, and the Madhumateya order of Central India and the Tamil Saivite adheenams. Each developed numerous sub-orders. Siddhanta monastics used the influence of royal patrons to propagate the teachings in neighboring kingdoms, particularly in South India. From Mattamayura, they established monasteries in regions now in Maharashtra, Karnataka, Andhra and Kerala.

In today's Tamil Nadu, there are both the ancient grhasta Amardaka lineage Aghora Paddhati Adi Shaiva Maths and the sanyasi non Adi Shaiva Meykandar Sampradaya Adheenams (monastic) today. Adi Shaiva Maths numbering around 40 are usually centred in Kongu Nadu and the 18 Adheenams in Tondai Nadu, Chola Nadu and Pandya Nadu.

In the Sinhalese areas of Sri Lanka, the Tamil Velala Gurukkal either returned back or merged with the priestly Kapurala caste but retaining their Tamil surnames with a few persisting in places like the Sella Kataragama temple. In Indonesia, Siwa Siddhanta syncretised with Tantrayana survives as Agama Hindu Dharma. In Indo-China, Shaiva Siddhanta survives as an uninstitutionalised worship of Shiva as an ancestral God of gods: Phra Isuan (Tamil: Isuwaran), while in Vietnamese Cham, it flourishes within the Balamon section.

== See also ==
- Vagisa Munivar

== Sources ==
- Flood, Gavin (2005). The Tantric Body: The Secret Tradition of Hindu Religion. I. B. Tauris. ISBN 1845110110.
- Klöber, Rafael (1 August 2017). "What is Saiva Siddhanta? Tracing Modern Genealogies and Historicising a Classical Canon". The Journal of Hindu Studies. 10 (2). doi:10.1093/jhs/hix013 (inactive 18 July 2025). ISSN 1756-4255.
