= Tiruvempavai =

Tamil hymns dedicated to Shiva

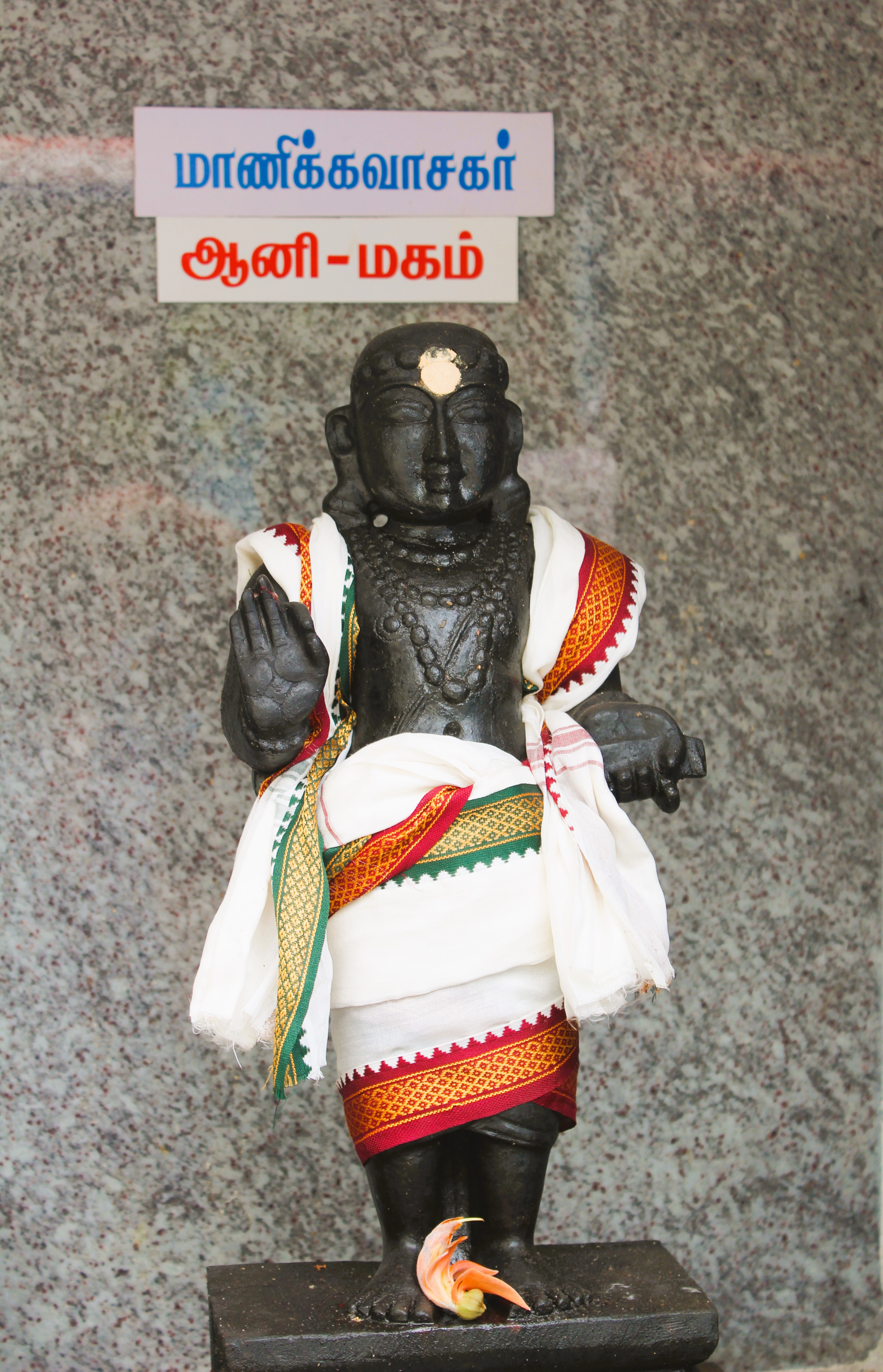
Manikkavacakar, the author of Tiruvempali, depicted here at Madhuvaneswarar Temple, Tamil Nadu

The Tiruvempavai (Tamil: திருவெம்பாவை, romanized: Tiruvempāvai) is a collection of songs composed by the poet-saint Manikkavacakar. It consists of 20 stanzas devoted to the Hindu deity Shiva. It forms part of the collection called the Tiruvasagam, and the 8th book of the Tirumurai, a canonical text of the Tamil Shaiva Siddhanta. The songs form part of the pavai ritual for unmarried young girls during the Tamil month of Margali.

Triyampawai, one of the twelve month ceremonies in royal Thai Hinduism, descended from the tradition of Tiruvempavai.

== Pavai genre ==
The pavai songs are part of an ancient tradition amongst unmarried young girls, where they would light lamps in the early mornings of Margali, and sing songs in praise of Shiva. The 20 stanzas are sung, one on every day and then followed by the 10 songs of the Tirupalliyeluchi. It is believed that such rituals would bring prosperity and a suitable husband.

== Verses ==
The first verse of the work extols the attributes of Shiva:

ஆதியும் அந்தமும் இல்லா அரும்பெருஞ்
சோதியை யாம்பாடக் கேட்டேயும் வாள்தடங்கண்
மாதே வளருதியோ வன்செவியோ நின்செவிதான்
மாதேவன் வார்கழல்கள் வாழ்த்திய வாழ்த்தொலிபோய்
வீதிவாய்க் கேட்டலுமே விம்மிவிம்மி மெய்ம்மறந்து
போதார் அமளியின்மேல் நின்றும் புரண்டிங்ஙன்
ஏதேனும் ஆகாள் கிடந்தாள் என் னேஎன்னே
ஈதே எந்தோழி பரிசேலோர் எம்பாவாய்

Ātiyum antamum illā arumperuñ
cōtiyai yāmpāṭak kēṭṭēyum vāḷtaṭaṅkaṇ
mātē vaḷarutiyō vaṉceviyō niṉcevitāṉ
mātēvaṉ vārkaḻalkaḷ vāḻttiya vāḻttolipōy
vītivāyk kēṭṭalumē vim'mivim'mi meym'maṟantu
pōtār amaḷiyiṉmēl niṉṟum puraṇṭiṅṅaṉ
ētēṉum ākāḷ kiṭantāḷ eṉ ṉē'eṉṉē
ītē entōḻi paricēlōr empāvāy

We are singing of the rare great flame that has no beginning and no end.
In spite of listening to it, O girl with sword-like sharp beautiful eye,
you still have not opened your sleeping eyes.
Is your ear senseless?
On hearing the praise of the perfect feet of the greatest deity, the sound of praise, which arises at the start of the street, one has forgotten herself weeping and weeping!
You, as if nothing happened, are coolly turning about enjoying the soft flowers spread on the bed,
what a pity!
Is this behavior becoming of you, my dear friend?

— Manikkavacakar, Verse 1
