= Manikkavacakar =

9th century Tamil Shaiva saint

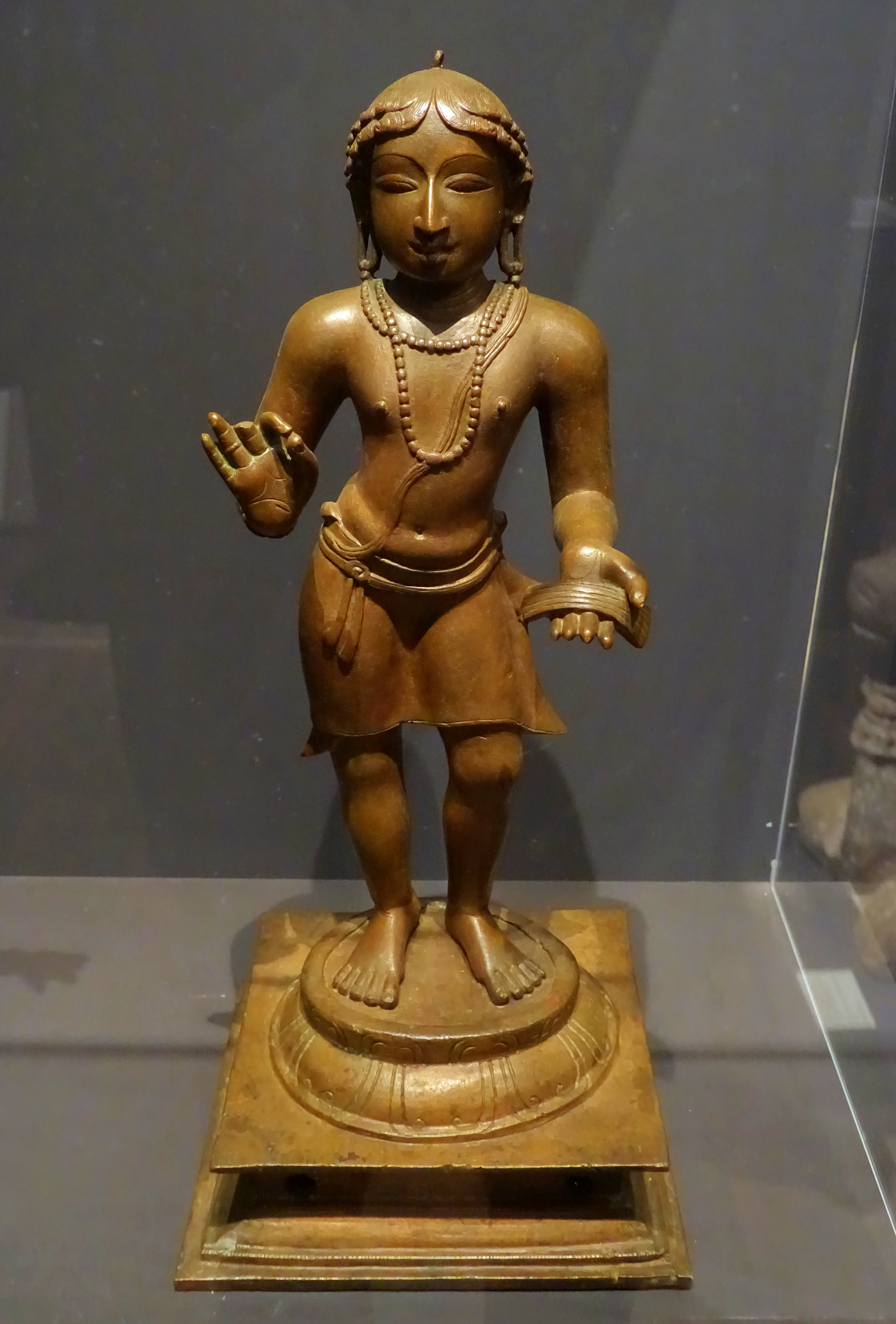
- Manikkavacakar, Chola bronze, 12th century India, at the Linden Museum, Stuttgart

Personal life
- Born: Vaadhavoor Adigal Tiruvadhavoor
- Notable work(s): Thiruvasagam, Thirukkovaiyar, Tiruvempavai
- Honors: Nalvar saint

Religious life
- Religion: Hinduism
- Philosophy: Shaivism Bhakti

Manikkavacakar was an ancient Tamil saint and poet who wrote Thiruvasagam and Thirukkovaiyar, books of Shaiva hymns. Tamil scholars and researchers share that he was a minister to the Pandya king Nedunjeliyan II (3rd Century CE) and lived in Madurai (or) he was a minister to the Pandya king Arikesari (6th Century CE).

He is revered as one of the Nalvar ("group of four" in Tamil), a set of four prominent Tamil saints alongside Appar, Sundarar and Sambandar. The other three contributed to the first seven volumes (Tevaram) of the twelve-volume Saivite work Tirumurai, the key devotional text of Shaiva Siddhanta. Manikkavacakar's Thiruvasagam and Thirukkovaiyar form the eighth volume. These eight volumes are considered to be the Tamil Vedas by the Shaivites, and the four saints are revered as Samaya Kuravar (religious preceptors)

His works are celebrated for their poetic expression of the anguish of being separated from God, and the joy of God-experience, with ecstatic religious fervour. In his expression of intimacy to God, Manikkavacakar mirrors the sentiments expressed by his fellow Bhakti period saints referring to the Lord as the "Divine Bridegroom" or the Nityamanavaalar ("Eternal Bridegroom"), with whom he longed to be united in "divine nuptials".

== Period ==
3rd Century CE

We get historical details about Manikkavacakar from Thiruvilaiyadal Puranam written by Paranjothiyar. In this book, the song 2799 "arikanai thoduthu vezham attavan chezhiyan vayil theri kalai amaichar", and the song 3044 "pandiyan muthukil pattathu chezhiyan panniyar (wife) udambinil pattathu" clearly states that the king's name is Chezhiyan.

In Sangam literature, Pathupattu describes Nedunjeliyan II's wars in detail, including his kadumpakattu yaanai – a type of elephant known for its swift movements on the battlefield – while engaging combatants seated on horses. Nedunjeliyan II was adorned with many titles in Sangam literature, mostly after the chariots and elephants he possessed. So, the same king is referenced with the title Arimarthanan in the songs 2718, 2721 and 3081 found in Thiruvilaiyadal Puranam book.

Another reference describes that Manikkavacakar's period is Appar's (6th Century CE)Tevaram 4.004 Thiruvaroor, Song 2 "Nariyai kuthirai seivanum" as this refers to the incident described by Manikkavacakar himself in his Thiruvasagam, Section 50 ஆனந்தமாலை, song 7 "Nariyai Kuthirai pariyaki gnala mellam nihalvithuperiya mathuraiyellam picha thetrum perunthuraiyai".

In Pandya Dynastry, there is no Pandiya king with the name as Arimarthanan, because it is a Title only. People mistakenly consider Manickkavacakar's period with that of the King Varaguna II (8th Century CE). Varaguna II is the king's name and people say his title as Arimarthanan. If Varaguna was the actual king, the Thiruvilaiyadal Puranam should have mentioned his name and the title. Instead, the songs refer him with the name, Nedunjeliyan II and his wife in the songs 2799 and 3044 and the title, Arimarthanan in 2718, 2721, 3081. It negates that Manickkavacakar and Varaguna || are contemporaries. Meanwhile, the Thiruvilaiyadal puranam songs line, "Arikanai thoduthu vezham attavan chezhiyan vayil theri kalai amaichar" states that Chezhiyan the King is known for his bravery of killing Elephants. In Madurai Kanchi poem, Mangudi Maruthanar describes the wars of Nedunjeliyan II (Chezhiyan) and that thousands of Elephants were killed in it.

6th Century CE

Narayana Ayyar, C. V. wrote the book Origin and Early History of Śaivism in South India. Madras University of Madras, 1974. In that book he has detailed about Manikkavacakar's period from page 398 to page 443 and concludes that his period is 6th Century CE.

== Life ==
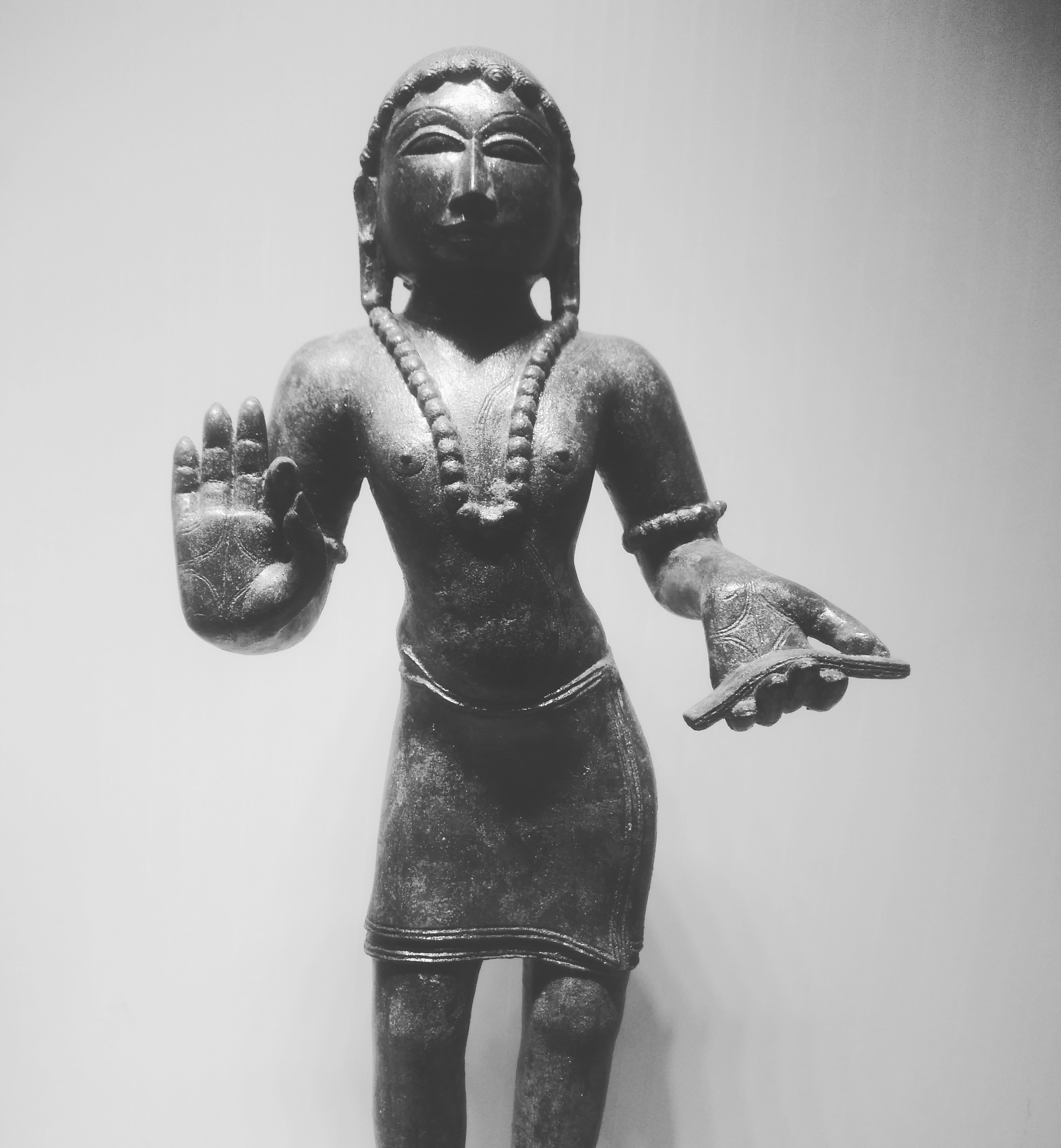
Manikkavacakar statue in tribhanga holding Palm leaf written "Om Namah Shivaya" in Tamizh script on it. Statue is in AP State Archeological Museum

Om symbol Tirumurai Om symbol in Tamil
The twelve volumes of Tamil Śaiva hymns of the sixty-three Nayanars
Parts	Name	Author
1,2,3	(Tevaram) Thirukkadaik Kaappu	Sambandar
4,5,6	Tevaram	Thirunavukkarasar
7	(Tevaram) Thiruppattu	Sundarar
8	Thiruvasakam & Thirukkovaiyar	Manickavasagar
9	Thiruvisaippa & Thirupallandu	Various
10	Thirumandhiram	Thirumular
11	Saiva Prabandham	Various
12	Periya Puranam	Sekkizhar
Paadal Petra Sthalam
Paadal Petra Sthalam
Rajaraja I
Nambiyandar Nambi

Manikkavacakar is said to have been born in Vadhavoor (known today as Thiruvathavur, near Melur seven miles from Madurai in modern day Tamilnadu state in South India).

He belonged to the Pandithar Shaiva temple priest guild. His father was a temple priest. The guild wore a top tilted head knot "Purva Sikha" to denote servitorship to the God Shiva. A mural and statuette of Manikkavacakar with Purva Sikha head knot is seen in Tirupperunturai near Pudukkottai. A poetic and elaborate hagiography of Manikkavacakar and his works were written in the 16th Century CE and is called Tiruvilayadal puranam, meaning "An account of divine deeds". Another one called Vadhavoorar puranam and yet another Sanskrit work of the 12th Century CE on the same saint are now missing.

According to accounts, the king of Pandyan dynasty had selected Manikkavacakar as one among his legion after seeing his military acumen. He was conferred with the title, "Thennavan bhramarayan" by the Pandyan king. The king had once entrusted him with a large amount of money to purchase horses for his cavalry. On his way he met an ascetic devotee of Shiva, who in fact was the God Himself. Manikkavacakar received enlightenment, realising that material things are transitory in nature and built a temple for Shiva in Tirupperunturai with the money given for purchasing horses. King Varaguna was also preached about the knowledge of reality and was blessed with salvation after Shiva made him realize about his worldly mistake.

Manikkavacakar's birth name is unclear, but he was known as Vadhavoorar after his birthplace. Manikkavacakar means 'man with words as precious as Manikkam'.

According to Ramana Maharishi, Manikkavacakar attained salvation by merging with a blinding bright light.

== Literary works ==
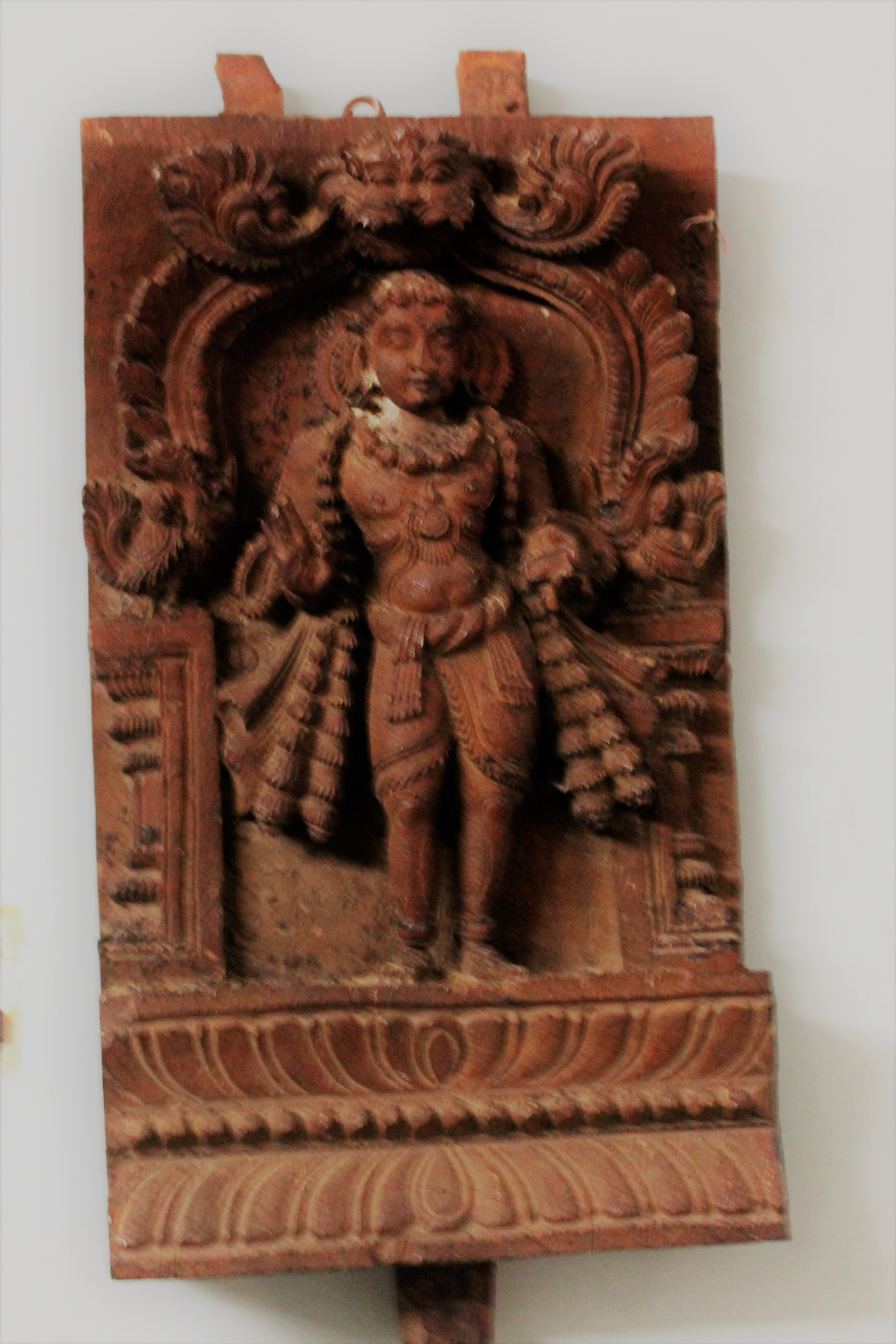
Manikkavacakar (Wooden Image), ASI Museum, Vellore

Thereafter Manikkavacakar moved from one place to other, singing and composing devotional songs. Finally, he settled in Chidambaram. His Tiruvasakam is placed near the Murti of God Shiva there. Several verses of Tiruvasagam including the Accho Patikam, after singing which he attained Mukti at Thillai Natarajar's feet, are also engraved on the walls of the Chidambaram temple. The Tiruchazhal hymn, after singing which the communal Buddhists were exposed, is also engraved in one of the prakarams of the temple. The work, Thiruchitrambalakkovaiyar was sung entirely in Thillai Chidambaram. Throughout his work he discusses how important it is to forego attachments of life and to cultivate dispassionate, devoted, sincere and simple hearted love towards the Lord Shiva in order to attain his beatitude and also that the Five Tamil Letters of Na Ma Si Va Ya alone give one Mukti.

Manikkavacakar's works have several parts. The Thiruvempaavai, a collection of twenty hymns in which he has imagined himself as a woman following the Paavai Nonbu and praising the God Shiva. The twenty songs of Thiruvempaavai and ten songs of Tiruppalliezhuchi on the Tirupperunturai Lord are sung all over Tamil Nadu in the holy month of Margazhi (The 9th month of the Tamil calendar, December and January).

He wrote Thirukkovaiyar before he attained Mukti in which he follows the tradition of having Lord Shiva as Thalaivan and considering himself as Thalaivi. It has a deeper meaning of Aanmah trying to reach Shivam.

Manikkavacakar is believed to have won intellectual arguments with Buddhists of Ceylon at Chidambaram. His festival is celebrated in the Tamil month of Aani (June - July). Manikkavacakar's hagiography is found in the Thiruvilaiyadar Puranam (16th century CE).

In 1921, an English translation of Manikkavacakar's hymns was done by Francis Kingsbury and GE Phillips, both of United Theological College, Bangalore (Edited by Fred Goodwill) and published in a book as Hymns of the Tamil Śaivite Saints, by the Oxford University Press.

== Associated temples ==
Manikkavacakar visited various temples in Thanjavur, North Arcot, Chengalpattu, Madras, Tirunelveli and Madurai districts of Tamil Nadu and revered the deities.

- Sculptures illustrating his life are found in the Meenakshi-Sundhareshwarar temple in Madurai.
- Manikkavacakar is said to have built the temple of Siva in Tirupperunturai.
- He is said to have lived at Chidambaram, Tamil Nadu.
- He is closely associated with Thiru Uthirakosamangai.

Tiruvempaavai is sung along with Sri Andal's Tiruppaavai widely across the temples in Tamil Nadu during the Tamil month of Margazhi (December - January).

Manikkavacakar's stone image is worshipped in almost all the Shiva temples of Tamil Nadu. A Chola bronze idol of Manikkavacakar with 57 cm (22 in) size in standing posture dated about 12th Century was found in Velankanni in Nagapattinam district. He is sported with his right hand in Upadesa posture and left hand holding a palm leaf manuscript. He is sported also as wearing a thin loincloth and a sacred thread over his chest. Another bronze idol of Manikkavacakar with a height of 64 cm (25 in) in standing posture dated about 1150 CE was found in Tiruindalur in Nagapattinam district. Unlike other idols, in this idol he is sported with locks of hair encircled with beads of Rudraksha. These bronze images are stored in the Bronze gallery in Government Museum, Chennai.
