= Tirumantiram =

Tamil Hindu work of literature

The Tirumantiram (Tamil: திருமந்திரம்) or Thirumantiram is a Tamil poetic work, written either in the 2nd century BCE and 4th century CE by Tirumular. It is the tenth of the twelve volumes of the Tirumurai, the key texts of Shaiva Siddhanta and the first known Tamil work to use the term. The Tirumantiram is the earliest known exposition of the Shaiva Agamas in Tamil. It consists of over three thousand verses dealing with various aspects of spirituality, ethics and praise of Shiva. But it is more spiritual than religious and one can see the difference between Vedanta and Siddhanta from Tirumular's interpretation of the Mahavakyas. According to historian Venkatraman, the work covers almost every feature of the siddhar of the Tamils. According to another historian, Madhavan, the work stresses on the fundamentals of Siddha medicine and its healing powers. It deals with a wide array of subjects including astronomy and physical culture.

== Etymology ==
Tirumantiram's literal meaning is "sacred mantra" or "holy incantation."

== Content ==
Om symbol Tirumurai Om symbol in Tamil
The twelve volumes of Tamil Śaiva hymns of the sixty-three Nayanars
Parts	Name	Author
1,2,3	(Tevaram) Thirukkadaik Kaappu	Sambandar
4,5,6	Tevaram	Thirunavukkarasar
7	(Tevaram) Thiruppattu	Sundarar
8	Thiruvasakam & Thirukkovaiyar	Manickavasagar
9	Thiruvisaippa & Thirupallandu	Various
10	Thirumandhiram	Thirumular
11	Saiva Prabandham	Various
12	Periya Puranam	Sekkizhar
Paadal Petra Sthalam
Paadal Petra Sthalam
Rajaraja I
Nambiyandar Nambi

The Tirumantiram is divided into nine chapters, 9 tantras (tantirams):

1. Philosophical views and divine experience, impermanency of the physical body, love, education etc.
2. Shiva's glory, His divine acts, classification of souls etc.
3. Yoga practices according to the eight-angled way of Patanjali. Also refers to Vasi Yoga
4. Mantra, tantra, etc.
5. Various branches of Saiva religion; the four elements of Shaiva Siddhanta.
6. Shiva as guru bestowing grace and the devotee's responsibility.
7. Shiva linga, Shiva worship, self-control.
8. The stages of soul experience.
9. Panchadsara manthiram, Shiva's dance, the state of samadhi.

The poems have a unique metrical structure, each line consisting of 11 or 12 syllables depending on the initial syllable. Tirumular discusses the four steps of spiritual progress; Charya, Kriya, Yoga and Gnana, the Shaiva Siddhanta concept of Pati, Pasu and Pasa where Pati stands for Shiva, Pasu stands for the humankind and Pasa stands for Maya (the desire), sadhana, Vedanta, the Upanishadic Tat tvam asi and other Vedantic concepts, the transcendental reality as emptiness (Sunya) devoid of any attribute and Tantrasastra (Shakti worship), chakras, magic spells and their accessories.

The section on Yoga, called "Shiva yoga", offers details not found in the Sanskrit text of Patanjali. The Tirumantiram describes means of attaining an immortal body (kaya siddhi), advocating a theory of preserving the body so that the soul would continue its existence (Udambai valarthen uyir valarthenae).

Tirumular is not only one of the 63 Nayanmars (Nayanars) but also a significant one among the 18 Siddhars. Tirumular has been referred to as "Nampiran" (meaning: nam-Our, piran-God, thus thirumular has been called as a leader or god to all the remaining Nayanars) by Sundarar in his thiru thondar thogai (the earliest song which mentions the names of 63 Nayanars). Tirumular as a moral philosopher teaches the ethics of non-violence (ahimsa), abstinence from slaughtering, meat and alcohol. He condemns coveting another man's wife. He declares that "love is God", proclaims the unity of mankind and God and stresses the acquisition of knowledge.

The final section of the Tirumantiram, named Sunya Sambhashana ("Colloquy on the Void"), is full of metaphorical sayings communicating mystical and speculative thoughts, for example;

பார்ப்பான் அகத்திலே பாற்பசு ஐந்துண்டு
மேய்பாருமின்றி வெறித்து திரிவன
மேய்ப்பாரும் உண்டாய் வெறியும் அடங்கினால்
பார்ப்பான் பசுஅய்ந்தும் பாலாய்ச் சொரியுமே Tirumantiram 2883.

Translation:

"There are 5 wandering cows, without a cowherd and impossible to milk them"
But if a cowherd, controls all five (cows), then it's possible to milk the 5 cows.

== See also ==
- Arutprakasa Vallalar Chidambaram Ramalinga Swamigal (Vallalar)
- Tirumular
- Agastyar

== Sources ==
- A Short Introduction: The Tamil Siddhas and the Siddha Medicine of Tamil Nadu By Marion Zimmermann
- The Encyclopaedia Of Indian Literature (Volume Five (Sasay To Zorgot), Volume 5 By Mohan Lal
- The Encyclopaedia Of Indian Literature (Volume Two) (Devraj To Jyoti), Volume 2 By Amaresh Datta
- Saivism in Philosophical Perspective: A Study of the Formative Concepts, Problems and Methods of Saiva Siddhanta By K. Sivaraman
- A dictionary of Indian literature, Volume 1 By Sujit Mukherjee
- The Tirumandiram, ISBN 9781895383614 (set of 10 volumes) English translation with commentary, 2010, T.N. Ganapathy et al.
- The Yoga of Tirumular: Essays on the Tirumandiram, by T.N. Ganapathy and K.R. Arumugam, ISBN 9781895383218
