= Tirumular =

Tamil Shaivite mystic and writer

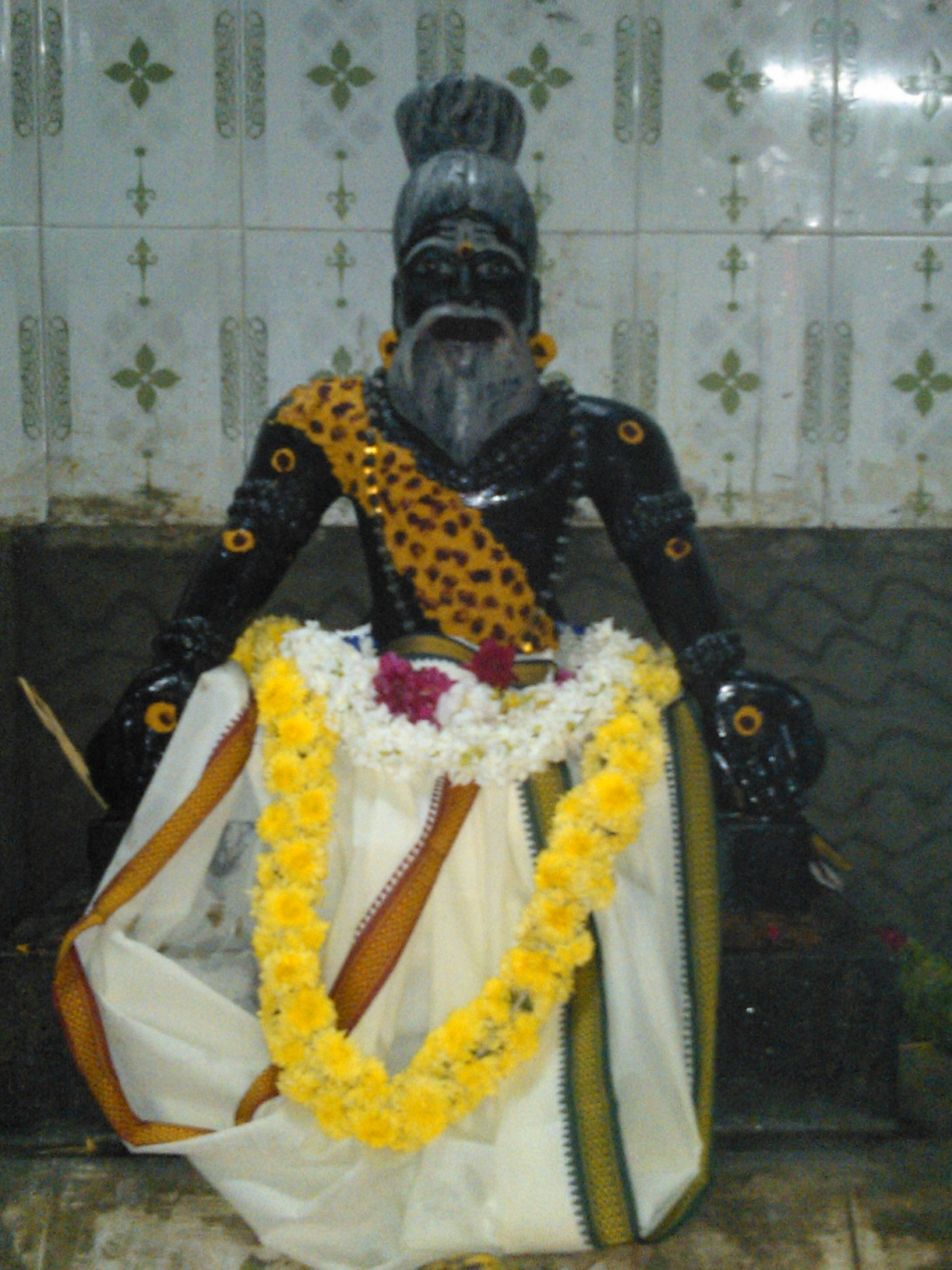
Murti of Tirumular

Om symbol Tirumurai Om symbol in Tamil
The twelve volumes of Tamil Śaiva hymns of the sixty-three Nayanars
Parts	Name	Author
1,2,3	(Tevaram) Thirukkadaik Kaappu	Sambandar
4,5,6	Tevaram	Thirunavukkarasar
7	(Tevaram) Thiruppattu	Sundarar
8	Thiruvasakam & Thirukkovaiyar	Manickavasagar
9	Thiruvisaippa & Thirupallandu	Various
10	Thirumandhiram	Thirumular
11	Saiva Prabandham	Various
12	Periya Puranam	Sekkizhar
Paadal Petra Sthalam
Paadal Petra Sthalam
Rajaraja I
Nambiyandar Nambi

Tirumular, also known as Suntaranāthar, was a Tamil Shaivite mystic and writer, considered one of the sixty-three poet-saints called the Nayanars, and is listed among a group of 18 sages called the Siddhars. His magnum opus, the Tirumantiram, consisting of over 3000 verses, forms a part of the key text of the Tamil Shaiva Siddhanta compilation called the Tirumurai.

== Chronology ==
The dates of Tirumular's life are controversial, and because his work makes reference to so many currents of religious thought, the dates that different scholars assign are often appealed to for anchoring the relative chronology of other literature in Tamil. Verse 74 of the Tirumantiram makes the claim that Tirumular lived for 7 yugas (ages) before composing the Tirumantiram.

Some are therefore inclined to place his composition well before the Common Era. The scholar and lexicographer S. Vaiyapuri Pillai, however, suggested that he probably belonged to the beginning of the eighth-century CE, pointing out that Tirumular could not very well be placed earlier given that he appears to refer to the Tevaram hymns of Sambandar, Appar, and Sundarar, that he used "very late words" and that he made mention of the weekdays.

Yet another view, alluded to for instance by Vaiyapuri Pillai (ibid.), is that the text may contain an ancient core, but with "a good number of interpolated stanzas" of later date. Whatever the case, allusions to works and ideas in the Tirumantiram cannot, at least for the moment, be used as useful indicators of their chronology.

== Legend ==
Suntaranāthar, as the saint was known, was a yogi originally from then Madurai. According to legend, he is believed to have travelled to Mount Kailash, where he was initiated by the deity Shiva. After spending 5 years at Mount Kailash, he undertook a journey under the order of Shiva to Tamilakam to meet his contemporary, the sage Agastya in Pothigai Hills. After meeting Agastya, he went to Chidambaram, and after worshiping Shiva at the Nataraja Temple, he was about to return to Mount Kailash. During his journey, near Sathanur village (a village near Aaduthurai), he saw a group of cows crying. He discovered that their cowherd, Mulan, was dead, having been bitten by a snake. Touched by the sight of the cows, he decided to use his yogic powers and move his soul from his body to that of the dead cowherd's, leaving his own body inside a log. On waking up in the body of the cowherd, the cows became happy; he then motioned them towards the village. When the saint wished to return to his own body, he was surprised to find that it was nowhere to be found. At this moment, he heard a divine voice from the sky, that of Shiva, who told him that he had been behind the disappearance of the body. The deity told him that he wished the saint to spread his teachings through the body of Mulan, allowing him to preach to the common folk in the vernacular Tamil spoken by the cowherd, as opposed to the literary Tamil in which the saint was well-versed. Suntaranāthar was henceforth called Tirumular, tiru meaning an epithet indicating respect. The saint is regarded to have engaged in meditation under a peepal tree in Thiruvavaduthurai, receiving holy hymns in Tamil. These three thousand holy hymns were compiled to become the book called the Tirumantiram.

== See also ==
- Agastya
- Kalangi Nathar
- Bogar
- Patanjali
- Thirumandhiram
