= Appar =

Seventh-century Tamil Śaiva poet-saint

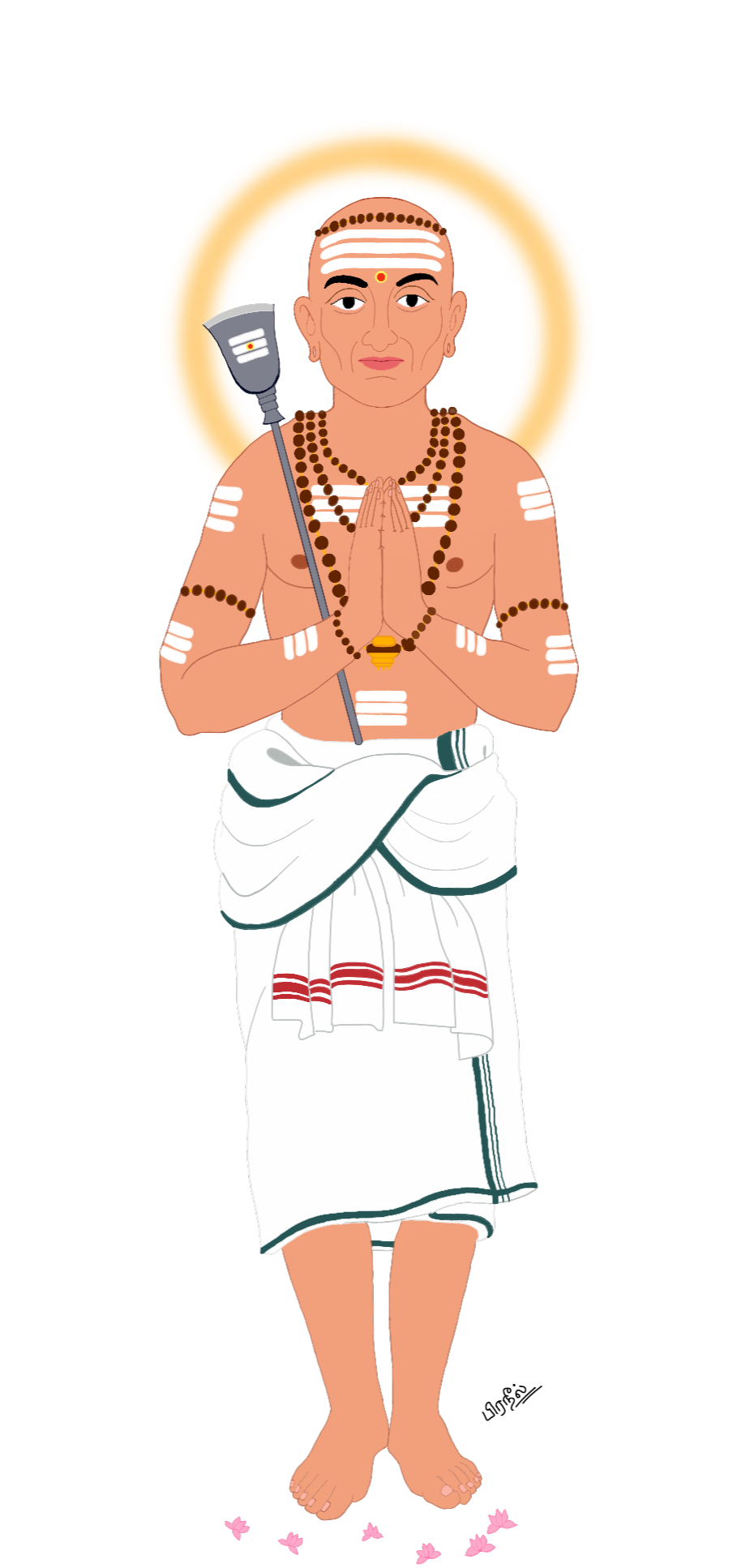
- Tirunavukkaracar (Appar)

Personal life
- Born: Marul Neekkiyar; 570 CE Tiruvamur, Panruti, Chola Kingdom (modern day Tiruvamur, Tamil Nadu, India)
- Died: 650 CE (aged 80) Thiruppugalur Chola Kingdom (modern day Nagapattinam District, Tamil Nadu, India)
- Notable work(s): Tevaram 4,5 (Tirukkuruntokai), 6 (Tiruttantakam)
- Honors: Nayanar saint, Muvar

Religious life
- Religion: Hinduism
- Philosophy: Shaivism Bhakti

Appar (Tamil: அப்பர்), also referred to as Tirunavukkaracar (Tamil: திருநாவுக்கரசர், romanized: Tirunāvukkaracar) or Navukkarasar, was a seventh-century Tamil Shaiva poet-saint. Born in a peasant Shaiva family, raised as an orphan by his sister, he lived about 80 years and is generally placed sometime between 570 and 650 CE. Appar composed 4,900 devotional hymns to the god Shiva, out of which 313 have survived and are now canonized as the 4th to 6th volumes of Tirumurai. One of the most prominent of the sixty-three revered Nayanars, he was an older contemporary of Sambandar.

His images are found and revered in Tamil Shiva temples. His characteristic iconography in temples show him carrying a farmer's small hoe – a gardening tool and weed puller.

== Names ==
Appar is also known as Tirunavukkaracar (lit. "King of the Tongue, Lord of Language"). His birth-name was Marulneekkiyar. He was renamed Dharmasenar while he studied and later served as the head of a Jain monastery. After he returned to Shaivism and began composing devotional hymns to Shiva, he has been historically referred to as Appar (lit. "father"), after the child poet-saint Sambandar lovingly called him Appar.

== Early life ==
An outline about Appar's life, without specifics, are found in his own hymns that were preserved by an oral tradition. A written collection of his hymns as well as more details are found in texts about four centuries after he died. One of the most studied version is the Sekkizhar's Periya Puranam, the last book of the Tirumurai. There, under Thiruninrasargam and in 428 verses, Sekkizhar presents the legendary life of Appar.

Appar was born in late 6th-century, likely between 570 and 596 CE. Some scholars place him a bit later, in early 7th-century. Appar was born in Vellalar caste by birth. His childhood name was Marunikkiyar (Marulneekiar). Orphaned, he was raised by his older sister Thilagavathiar. Thilagavathiar was betrothed to a military commander who died in war. She never married thereafter, devoted herself to Shaivism and to taking care of her little brother. He spent his childhood in Tiruvamur village near Atikai by most accounts.

=== Conversion to Jainism and return to Shaivism ===
Om symbol Tirumurai Om symbol in Tamil
The twelve volumes of Tamil Śaiva hymns of the sixty-three Nayanars
Parts	Name	Author
1,2,3	(Tevaram) Thirukkadaik Kaappu	Sambandar
4,5,6	Tevaram	Thirunavukkarasar
7	(Tevaram) Thiruppattu	Sundarar
8	Thiruvasakam & Thirukkovaiyar	Manickavasagar
9	Thiruvisaippa & Thirupallandu	Various
10	Thirumandhiram	Thirumular
11	Saiva Prabandham	Various
12	Periya Puranam	Sekkizhar
Paadal Petra Sthalam
Paadal Petra Sthalam
Rajaraja I
Nambiyandar Nambi

Unlike his sister, Appar turned to Jainism. He left home, joined a Jain monastery, where he was renamed Dharmasena (Tarumacenar). He studied Jainism and years later became the head of the Jain monastery in Tiruppatirippuliyur. After a while, afflicted by a painful stomach illness, Dharmasena returned home. His sister gave him Tiruniru (sacred ash) and taught him the five syllable mantra "namaccivaya" (Namah Shivaya). According to the account, Tirunavukkarasar became convinced of the superiority of Shaivism after recovering from his illness, which he attributed to Shiva. Then they went together to a Shiva temple in Atikai, where he spontaneously composed his first hymn of Tevaram. As he sang the second verse, he was miraculously cured of his stomach illness. Thereafter, he came to be known as Navukkaracar (from Skt: Vagisa, "king of speech") or more popularly just Appar. He thus left Jainism and become a devout Shaiva.

Appar's hymns are intimately devotional to Shiva, but occasionally include verses where he repents the Jain period of his life. In Tevaram hymn IV.39 and others, he criticizes the Jain monastic practice of not brushing teeth, the lack of body hygiene, their barbaric ascetic practices, the doctrine of pallurai (anekantavada) as self-contradictory relativism, the hypocrisy of running away from the world and work yet begging for food in that same world, and others.

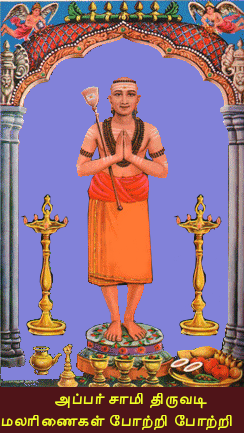
Appar swami

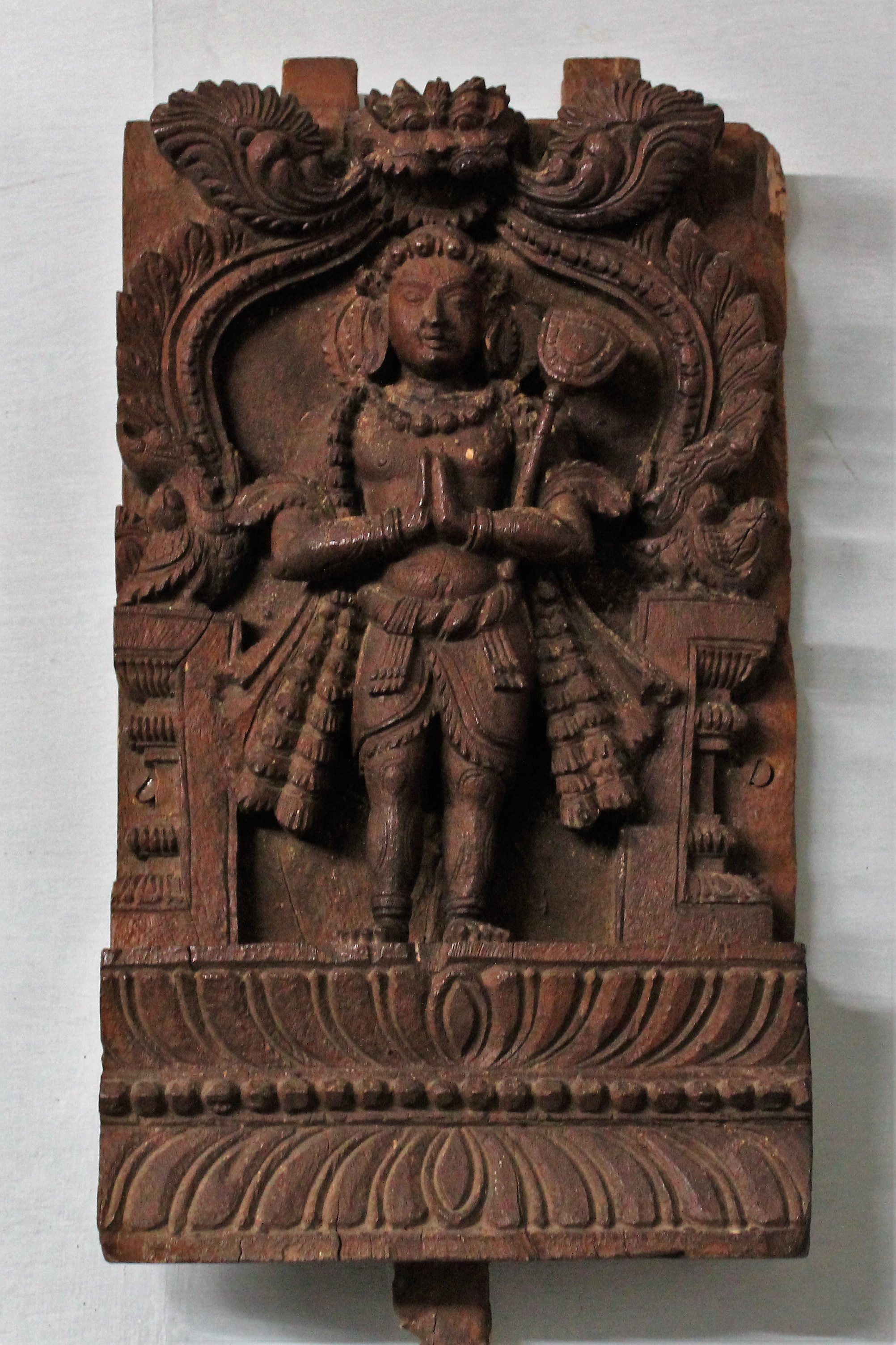
Appar (Wooden Image), ASI Museum, Vellore

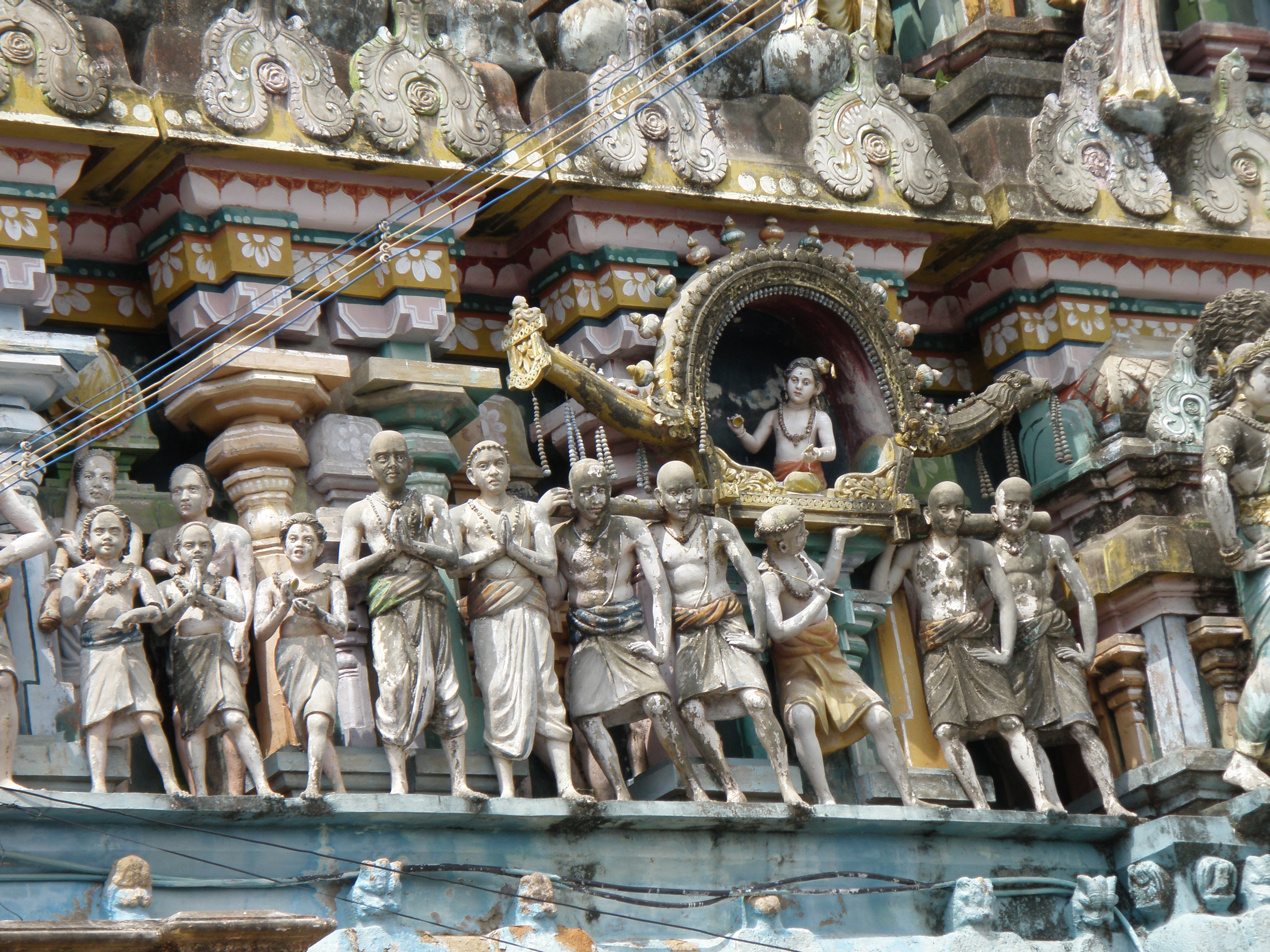
Amirthakadaieeshwarar temple relief depicting Appar bearing Sambandar's palanquin

=== Bhakti ===
Appar largely stayed at Atikai with his sister before visiting other Shiva temples to sing in praise of Shiva. He heard of Sambandar and went to Sirkali to meet him. Sambandar respectfully addressed Navukkarasar as Appar (father) and he and Appar travelled together singing hymns. Appar is said to have traveled to about a hundred and twenty-five temples in different cities or villages in Tamil Nadu. He died in Sadhaya Nakshtra in the Tamil month of Chithirai at Tirupukalur Shiva temple at the age of 81.

== Appar's Tevaram ==
The Tamil Shaiva tradition believes that Appar extolled Siva in 4,900 hymns (49,000 stanzas). Of these 313 hymns (3,130 stanzas) have survived, later compiled in the fourth, fifth and sixth volumes of the Tirumurai, the Tamil poetic canon of Shaiva Siddhanta. The compilation of these books is generally ascribed to Nambiyandar Nambi (10th century CE). Some of Appar's hymns set to various Panns, the melodic modes of Ancient Tamil music – the rest are set to Tirunerisai and Viruttam metres. In the last four decades of his life, he visited on foot no less than 125 shrines of Shiva, scattered over a territory of a one thousand miles (1,600 km). He was the only one of the four kuravars to visit the shrine at Tirukokarnam on the western coast of India. He sang 312 decads comprising 3,056 stanzas of devotion.

All the songs in the Tevaram (called pathikam, Tamil:பதிகம்) are believed to be in sets of ten. The hymns were set to music denoted by Panns and are part of the canon of the Tamil music. They continue to be part of temple liturgy today. Several of these poems refer to historic references pointing to the saint-poets' own life, voice of devotee persona, using interior language of the mystic. Multi-vocal rhetoric is commonly used taking on personal emotions and genres and some voices of classical Sangam literature. Appar's poems dealt with inner, emotional and psychological state of the poet saint. The metaphors used in the poems have deep agrarian influence that is considered one of the striking chords for common people to get accustomed to the verse. The quote below is a popular song of Appar glorifying Shiva in simple diction.

மாசில் வீணையும் மாலை மதியமும்
வீசு தென்றலும் வீங்கிள வேனிலும்
மூசு வண்டறை பொய்கையும் போன்றதே
ஈசன் எந்தை இணையடி நீழலே"

("Mācil vīṇaiyum mālai matiyamum
vīcu těņṛalum vīŋkiḷa vēņilum
mūcu vaṇţaṛai pǒykaiyum pōņṛatē
īcaņ ěntai iṇaiyaţi nīļalē")

translating to

"My Lord's twin feet are like the blemishless Veena
like the full-moon of the evening
like the gentle breeze blowing from the South
like the young spring
like a bee-humming pond "

The tendency to incorporate place names known to the folks in the idiom of the poems is another characteristic feature of Tevaram. The poems also involved glorifying the feat of Shiva in the particular location – the usage of locale continuously occurring in the verses is a testament. According to Prentiss, the poems do not represent social space as a contested space, the hymns represent the hymnists were free to wander and to offer their praise of Shiva. The emotional intensity of the hymns represent spontaneous expression of thought as an emotional responses to God. The hymnists made classificatory lists of places like katu (for forest), turai (port or refuge), kulam (water tank) and kalam (field) being used – thus both structured and unstructured places in the religious context find a mention in Tevaram.

== Compilation ==
Raja Raja Chola I (ruled 985–1013 CE) embarked on a mission to recover the hymns after hearing short excerpts of Tevaram in his court. He sought the help of Nambi Andar Nambi, who was a priest in a temple. It is believed by Tamil Shaiva that Nambi found the scripts by divine intervention, in the form of cadijam leaves half eaten by white ants in a chamber inside the second precinct in Thillai Nataraja Temple, Chidambaram.

Rajaraja thus became known as Tirumurai Kanda Cholan meaning one who saved the Tirumurai. The king added the images of the Nayanar poet-saints inside the Shiva temple. Nambi arranged the hymns of three saint poets Sambanthar, Appar and Sundarar as the first seven books.

In 1918, 11 more songs were found engraved in a stone temple in Tiruvidavayil in a village close to Nannillam, and it was the first instance found where Tevaram verses were found in inscriptions.

=== Translations ===
Francis Kingsbury and Godfrey Phillips selected and translated 39 out of 313 of Appar's hymns into English in 1921. These were published with small collection of Sambandar and Sundarar hymns in a book titled Hymns of the Tamil Śaivite Saints, released by the Oxford University Press. They stated that these were some of the hymns from Devaram (Tevaram) that they could hear being chanted in South Indian Shiva temples of their times.

In 1959, Dorai Rangaswamy published a prose translation with commentary on about 100 Appar's hymns in Volume 3 of his collected works on Tevaram. More recent English translations of many more select hymns by Appar have been published by Indira Peterson.

== Legacy ==
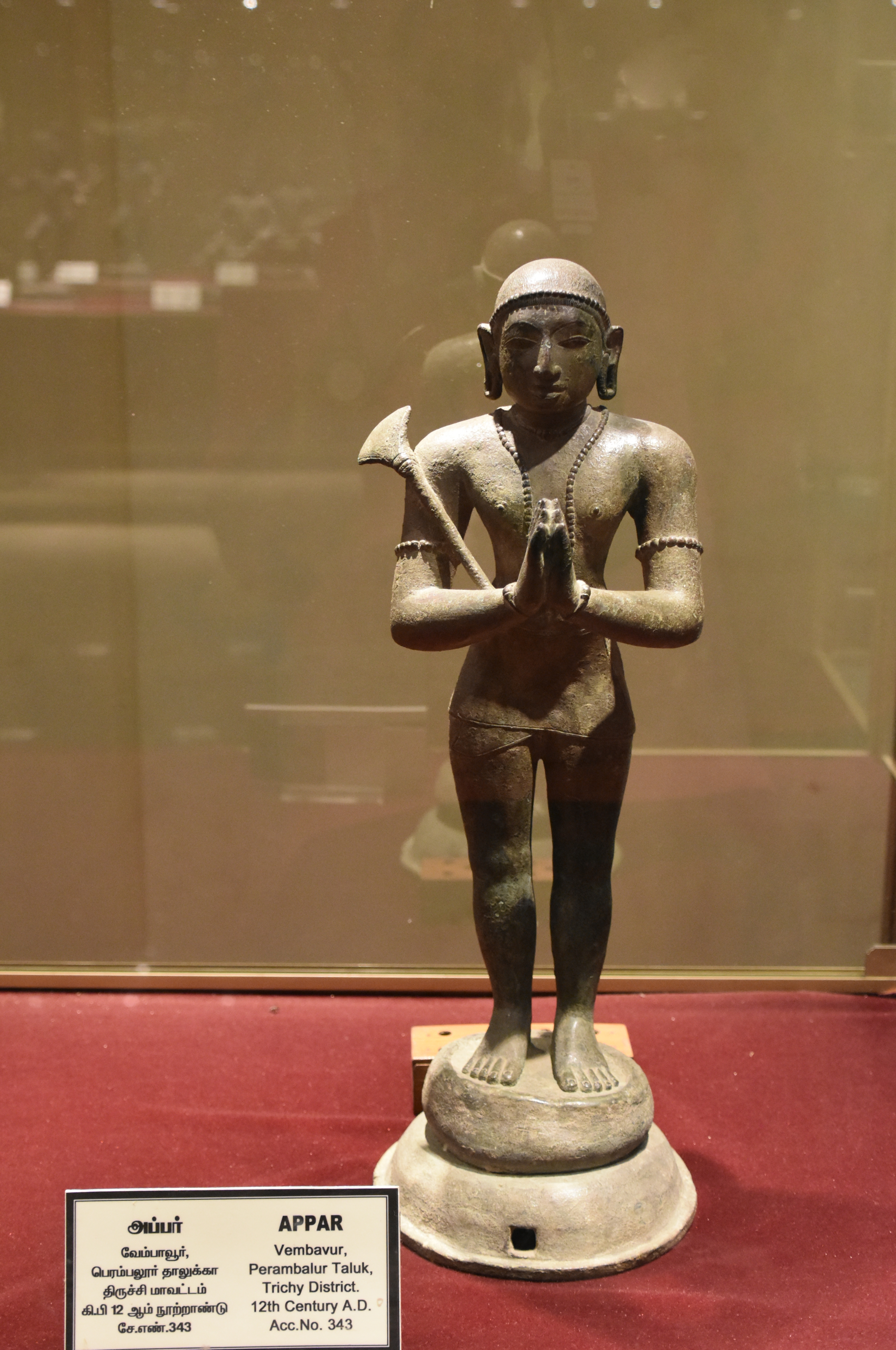
Bronze image of Appar from 12th century - Vembavur, Perambalur district

Appar is traditionally credited with converting the Pallava king, Mahendravarman to Shaivism. His efforts helped expand the sacred geography of Shaivism and bring fame to smaller Shiva temples. Appar sanctified all these temples by his verses and was also involved in cleaning of the dilapidated temples with his ulavarapadai (farmer's gardening hoe) – now a part of his iconography.

=== Temple services ===
Appar celebrated the Vedas, and connected the Vedic ritual to the temple Agamic puja that is ever since followed in Shiva temples. According to John Cort – a scholar of Jainism and Hinduism studies, the Agamic temple rituals perpetuate the Vedic practices. Appar and other Nayanars helped transform this "as the central element of the Saiva Siddhanta philosophical and theological system, and thus of Tamil Saiva soteriology", states Cort, by emphasizing the instrumentality and efficacy of the temple and its rituals. According to Appar and others, the Vedic and the Agamic overlap, are alternate roads to the same spiritual end, both evoke a transformation in the devotee, with the difference that temple-based Saiva puja alone is emphasized in the tradition that Appar and other Nayanars helped create.

Appar's tradition has thrived in Tamil Shiva temples. Odhuvars, Sthanikars, or Kattalaiyars offer musical programmes in Shiva temples of Tamil Nadu by singing Tevaram after the daily rituals. These are usually carried out as chorus programme soon after the divine offering. The singing of Tevaram was followed by musicals from the music pillars in such temples like Madurai Meenakshi Amman Temple, Nellaiappar Temple and Suchindram. The singers of these hymns were referred as Tirupadiyam Vinnapam seyvar or Pidarar, from the inscriptions of Nandivarman III in the Tiruvallam Bilavaneswara temple records. Rajaraja deputed 48 pidarars and made liberal provisions for their maintenance and successors.

Historic inscriptions give details about the gifts rendered to the singers of Tevaram from Parantaka I of the 8th century. A record belonging to Rajendra I mentions Tevaranayakan, the supervisor of Tevaram and shows the institutionalisation of Tevaram with the establishment of a department. There are records from Kulothunga Chola III from Nallanyanar temple in South Arcot indicating singing of Tiruvempavai and Tiruvalam of Manickavasagar during special occasion in the temple. From the 13th century, the texts were passed on to the Odhuvars by the Adheenams or charitable establishments. The charitable establishments that ran on philanthropy of individuals and merchant caravans had come to be because after the 13th century, the time of ancient nation states viz. cholas etc. was finished, and the temples became only denominated, voluntary, charitable places. This is briefed by a 15th-century, chidambaram temple inscription. During the time of cholas etc. the temple hymn service workers were known as uvacchar and marars. These terms are of very ancient origin and traceable to even early sangam times.

Appar's stone image is revered in almost all Shiva temples of Tamil Nadu. A Chola bronze of Appar with 57 cm (22 in) in standing posture dated to about 12th century was found in Vembavur in Perambalur district. He is sported with beads of Rudraksha on both his arms and neck. The bronze image is stored in the Bronze gallery in Government Museum, Chennai.

=== History and culture ===
Appar's hymns provide a window into the history and culture of Tamil Hindus between the 7th and 9th-century, states Paramasivanandan. They mention names of rulers, towns, villages, festivals, agriculture, trade, temples, role of temple in providing social support during famines and economic hardship, role of temples in dance, music, arts, life rituals, social conditions, literature, and the education system. Given Appar's study of Digambara Jainism prior to returning to Shaiva Hinduism, it also includes a historic view into the two traditions.
