= Periya Puranam =

Hindu Shaiva text

Om symbol Tirumurai Om symbol in Tamil
The twelve volumes of Tamil Śaiva hymns of the sixty-three Nayanars
Parts	Name	Author
1,2,3	(Tevaram) Thirukkadaik Kaappu	Sambandar
4,5,6	Tevaram	Thirunavukkarasar
7	(Tevaram) Thiruppattu	Sundarar
8	Thiruvasakam & Thirukkovaiyar	Manickavasagar
9	Thiruvisaippa & Thirupallandu	Various
10	Thirumandhiram	Thirumular
11	Saiva Prabandham	Various
12	Periya Puranam	Sekkizhar
Paadal Petra Sthalam
Paadal Petra Sthalam
Rajaraja I
Nambiyandar Nambi

The Periya‌ Purāṇa‌m (Tamil: பெரிய‌ புராண‌ம்), that is, the great purana or epic, sometimes called Tiruttontarpuranam ("Tiru-Thondar-Puranam", the Purana of the Holy Devotees), is a Tamil poetic account depicting the lives of the sixty-three Nayanars, the canonical poets of Tamil Shaivism. It was compiled during the 12th century by Sekkilar. The Periya Puranam is part of the corpus of Shaiva canonical works.

Sekkilar compiled and wrote the Periya Puranam or the Great Purana in Tamil about the life stories of the sixty-three Shaiva Nayanars, poets of the deity Shiva who composed the liturgical poems of the Tirumurai, and was later himself canonised and the work became part of the sacred canon. Among all the hagiographic Puranas in Tamil, Sekkilar's Tiruttondar Puranam or Periyapuranam, composed during the rule of Kulottunga II (1133–1150 CE) stands first.

== Background ==
Sekkilar was a poet and the chief minister in the court of the Chola King, Kulothunga Chola II. Kulottunga Chola II, king Anabaya Chola, was a staunch devotee of Natraja, the form of Shiva worshipped at Chidambaram. He continued the reconstruction of the center of Tamil Shaivism that was begun by his ancestors. However, Kulottunga II was also enchanted by the Jain courtly epic, Chivaka Chinthamani an epic of erotic flavour (sringara rasa) whose hero, Chivaka, combines heroics and erotics to marry eight damsels and gain a kingdom. In the end he realises the transiency of possessions, renounces his kingship and finally attains Nirvana by prolonged austerity (tapas).

In order to wean Kulottunga Chola II from the heretical Chivaka Chintamani, Sekkilar undertook the task of writing the Periyapuranam.

== Periyapuranam ==
The study of Chivaka Chintamani by Kulottunga Chola II, deeply affected Sekkilar who was very religious in nature. He exhorted the king to abandon the pursuit of impious erotic literature and turn instead to the life of the Shaiva saints celebrated by Sundaramurti Nayanar and Nambiyandar Nambi. The king thereupon invited Sekkilar to expound the lives of the Shaiva saints in a great poem. As a minister of the state Sekkilar had access to the lives of the saints and after he collected the data, he wrote the poem in the Thousand Pillared Hall of the Chidambaram temple. Legend has it that Shiva himself provided Sekkilar with the first feet of the first verse as a divine voice from the sky declaring "உலகெலாம்" (ulakelam: All the world).

This work is considered the most important initiative of Kulottunga Chola II's reign. Although, it is only a literary embellishment of earlier hagiographies of the Shaiva saints composed by Sundarar and Nambiyandar Nambi, it came to be seen as the epitome of high standards of the Chola culture, because of the highest order of the literary style. The Periyapuranam is considered a fifth Veda in Tamil and immediately took its place as the twelfth and the last book in the Shaiva canon. It is considered one of the masterpieces of the Tamil literature and worthily commemorates the Golden age of the Cholas.

== Significance ==
All the saints mentioned in this epic poem are historical persons. Therefore, this is a recorded history of the 63 Shaiva saints called as Nayanars (devotees of Shiva), who attain salvation by their unflinching devotion to Siva. The Nayanmars that he talks about belonged to different communities, different occupations and lived in different times.
