= Tirukkovaiyar =

Tamil Hindu work

The Tirukkovaiyar (Tamil: திருக்கோவையார், romanized: Tirukkōvaiyār) is a Shaivite work composed by Manikkavacakar. Dated to the 9th century CE, the work is part of the 12-volume Tirumurai and, along with Thiruvasagam, is traditionally placed as the 8th volume of the work. The work is also known as the Thiruchitrambalakkovaiyar.

== Description ==
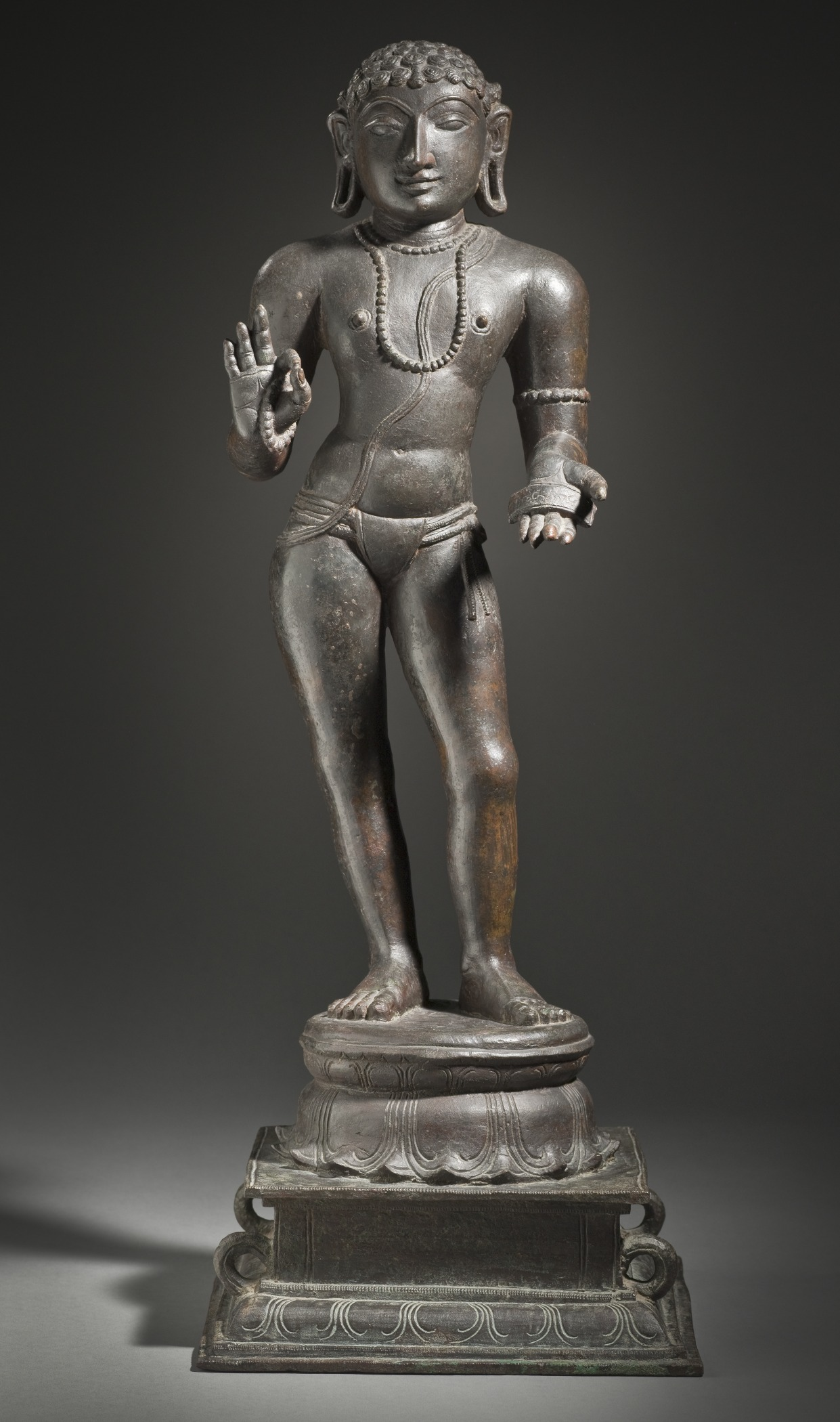
Sculpture of Manikkavacakar

Om symbol Tirumurai Om symbol in Tamil
The twelve volumes of Tamil Śaiva hymns of the sixty-three Nayanars
Parts	Name	Author
1,2,3	(Tevaram) Thirukkadaik Kaappu	Sambandar
4,5,6	Tevaram	Thirunavukkarasar
7	(Tevaram) Thiruppattu	Sundarar
8	Thiruvasakam & Thirukkovaiyar	Manickavasagar
9	Thiruvisaippa & Thirupallandu	Various
10	Thirumandhiram	Thirumular
11	Saiva Prabandham	Various
12	Periya Puranam	Sekkizhar
Paadal Petra Sthalam
Paadal Petra Sthalam
Rajaraja I
Nambiyandar Nambi

Known as "Aranam" among Shaivite scholars, which translates to "Vedas," the work consists of 400 verses. The work is divided into 25 chapters. On a superficial view, the work may appear as part of the Tamil akam genre of poetry. The work was sung entirely in Nataraja Temple, Chidambaram. In the work, Shiva is associated with the golden hall of the temple, where the deity is believed to perform his cosmic dance called the tandava.

== Translations ==
In 1921, an English translation of Manikkavacakar's hymns was done by Francis Kingsbury and GE Phillips, both of United Theological College, Bangalore (Edited by Fred Goodwill) and published in a book as Hymns of the Tamil Śaivite Saints, by the Oxford University Press
