= Thiruvasagam =

Volume of Tamil hymns

Thiruvasagam (Tamil: திருவாசகம், romanized: thiruvācakam, lit. 'sacred sayings') is a volume of Tamil hymns composed by the 3rd century Saivite poet Manikkavacakar. It contains 51 compositions and constitutes the eighth volume of the Thirumurai, the sacred anthology of the Tamil Saiva Siddhanta.

Legend has it that Manikkavacakar was appointed as minister by king Arimarttanar and sent to purchase 10,000 horses from horse traders but spent the money building a temple in Tirupperunthurai.

As the legend goes, Thiruvasagam is the only work which is signed as well as written by Siva in guise of a Tamil man when narrated by Manikkavacakar. The poet chased the writer but without success but the palm leaf manuscript had been seen inside the locked sanctum sanctorum of Thillai Nataraja with the deity's signature.

== Poet ==
Manikkavacakar's Thiruvasagam and Thirukovayar are compiled as the eighth Tirumurai and is full of visionary experience, divine love and urgent striving for truth. Though he is not counted as one of the 63 Shaiva Nayanars, he is counted as one of the Nalvar ("The Four") consisting of himself and the first three Nayanars namely Appar, Sambandar, and Sundarar. He was born in a Pandithar Shaivite temple priest guild in Tiruvatavur near Madurai. His father was an advisor to the Pandya king and he followed his father's footsteps in becoming the king's minister. His period is 3rd century CE. Manikkavacakar was the king's prime minister and renounced his post in search of divinity. The king bestowed his minister to buy horses, but he was taken to divinity by the vision of Shiva with his saints. The minister spent his entire sum of money in building the temple at Tirupperunturai, considered an architectural marvel among Hindu temples. From the time, the saint poet wandered to various temples and devoted hymns on Shiva. His conversion is attributed to Sivajnana bodham, a Shaivite work by Meykandar. He was an orthodox Shaivite and represents bhakti at its highest form in his age.

Tirupperunturai (Tamil: திருபெருந்துறை), also known as Avudayar Koil, is a Shiva temple where Thiruvasagam is believed to have been originated. Manikkavacakar is said to have converted the king to Shaivism and built the temple with money that had been intended for war-horses.

== Work ==
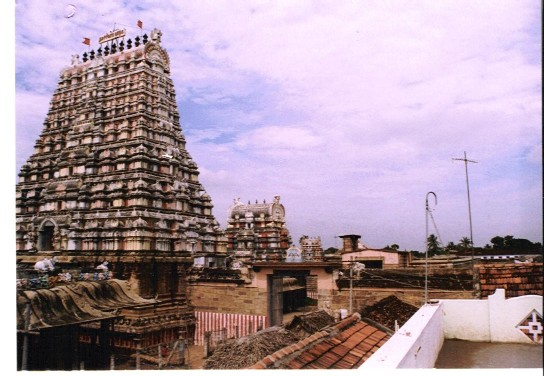
Avudayar Koil temple

Om symbol Tirumurai Om symbol in Tamil
The twelve volumes of Tamil Śaiva hymns of the sixty-three Nayanars
Parts	Name	Author
1,2,3	(Tevaram) Thirukkadaik Kaappu	Sambandar
4,5,6	Tevaram	Thirunavukkarasar
7	(Tevaram) Thiruppattu	Sundarar
8	Thiruvasakam & Thirukkovaiyar	Manickavasagar
9	Thiruvisaippa & Thirupallandu	Various
10	Thirumandhiram	Thirumular
11	Saiva Prabandham	Various
12	Periya Puranam	Sekkizhar
Paadal Petra Sthalam
Paadal Petra Sthalam
Rajaraja I
Nambiyandar Nambi

Most of the portions in Thiruvasagam is first sung in Thillai Nataraja Temple at Chidambaram. It is considered one of the profound works of Tamil literature and it discusses every phase of spiritual path from doubt and anguish to perfect understanding in Shiva, from earthly experience to teacher-disciple relationship and ultimately freedom from rebirth. There are 658 poems in the work and along with 400 poems in Tirukovayar by the same author make it the 8th volume of Tirumarai - the 12 volume Shaiva canon. The author finds both theistic and pantheistic ideas corresponding to medieval India, but identifies God with the universe. Manikkavacakar often finds himself unworthy of Shiva being his saviour. It is said that this made Shiva feel sorry for him and bless him. As a devotional literature, it finds alternatives between joy and sorrow.

=== Tiruvempavai ===
"Tiruvempavai" - the early morning wake up songs sung for Shiva on Tamil month Margali are part of Thiruvasagam. Tiruvempavai songs were composed in Annamalaiyar Temple.

In Thailand, an annual Giant Swing ceremony known as Triyampavai-Tripavai was held in major cities until 1935, when it was abolished for safety reasons. The name of the ceremony was derived from the names of Tiruvempavai and Tiruppavai (a Vaishnavite hymn by Andal). It is known that Tiruvempavai verses — poet pratu sivalai ("opening the portals of Shiva's home") — were recited at this ceremony, as well as the coronation ceremony of the Thai king. According to T.P. Meenakshisundaram, the name of the festival indicates that Tiruppavai might have been recited as well.

== Compilation ==
Raja Raja Chola I (985-1013 CE) embarked on a mission to recover the hymns after hearing short excerpts of Tevaram in his court. He sought the help of Nambi Andar Nambi, who was a priest in a temple. It is believed that by divine intervention Nambi found the presence of scripts, in the form of cadijam leaves half eaten by white ants in a chamber inside the second precinct in Thillai Nataraja Temple, Chidambaram. The Brahmanas (Dikshitars) in the temple opposed the mission, but Rajaraja intervened by consecrating the images of the saint-poets through the streets of Chidambaram. Rajaraja thus became known as Tirumurai Kanda Cholan meaning one who saved the Tirumurai. Thus far Shiva temples only had images of god forms, but after the advent of Rajaraja, the images of the Nayanar saints were also placed inside the temple. Nambi arranged the hymns of three saint poets Sambandar, Appar and Sundarar as the first seven books, Manikkavacakar's Tirukovayar Thiruvasagam as the 8th book, the 28 hymns of nine other saints as the 9th book, the Tirumantiram of Tirumular as the 10th book, 40 hymns by 12 other poets as the 10th book, Tirutotanar Tiruvantati - the sacred antati of the labours of the 63 Nayanar saints and added his own hymns as the 11th book. The first seven books were later called as Tevaram, and the whole Shaiva canon, to which was added, as the 12th book, Sekkilar's Periya Puranam (1135 CE) is wholly known as Tirumurai, the holy book.

== Grammar ==
Thiruvasagam songs are a collection of dynamic poetic meters (yāppu). The following yāppu forms are used across the 51 patikams (decads):

Veṇpā

- Kaliveṇpā
- Nēricai veṇpā

Āciriyappā

- Nilaimāṇṭila āciriyappā
- Iṇaikkuṟaḷ āciriyappā

Kalippā

- Koccakak kalippā
- Taravu koccakak kalippā
- Nālaṭit taravu koccakak kalippā
- Āṟaṭittaravuk koccakak kalippā

Viruttam

- Kaliviruttam
- Āciriya viruttam
- Aṟucīr āciriya viruttam
- Eḻucīr āciriya viruttam
- Aṟucīrk kaḻineṭilaṭi āciriya viruttam
- Eḻucīrk kaḻineṭilaṭi āciriya viruttam
- Eṇcīrk kaḻineṭilaṭi āciriya viruttam
- Paṉṉiru cīrkkaḻineṭilaṭi āciriya viruttam

Others

- Kalittāḻicai
- Kaṭṭaḷaik kalitturai
- Kalavaip pāṭṭu

== Translation works on Thiruvasagam ==
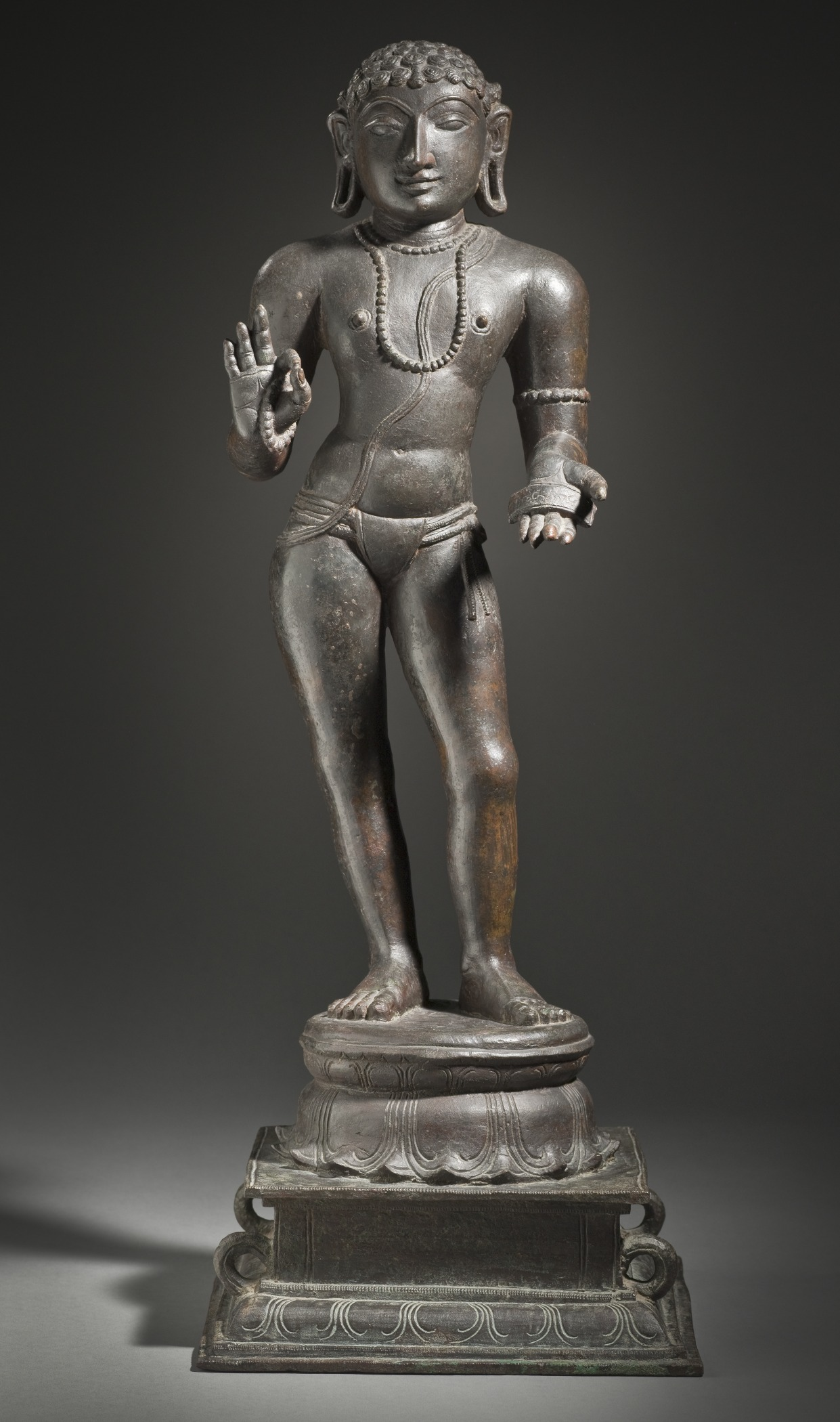
Sculpture of Manikkavacakar, Tamil Nadu, early 12th century

George Uglow Pope, an Anglican Christian missionary, was born on 24 April 1820 on Prince Edward Island in Canada. He became interested in Tamil and learned the language during a six-month ship voyage to India. His magnum opus, an English translation of Thiruvasagam, appeared in 1900. Pope found a close affinity to the utterances of sincere devotion in such verses as 'Longing for devotion alone', 'Without thy presence I pine', 'Deadness of soul', 'God all in all', 'I am thine, save me', 'His love demands my all'. He also compared Manickavasgar to the likes of St. Paul and St. Francis of Assisi.

=== G.U.Pope Translation ===
G.U.Pope translated Thiruvasagam.

Victory to the foot of the King, who soothed my soul's unrest and made me His !
Victory to the jewelled foot of Pinnagan, who severs continuity of birth !
Victory to the flower-foot of Him Who is far from those without !
Victory to the anklets of the King, rejoicing 'mid those that fold adoring hands !
Victory to the anklets of the glorious One, who uplifts those that bow the head ! (10)

And in places G.U.Pope mentions the difficulty about translating these Tamil poems to the proper meaning in English. He states, "Lines 66-95 are well nigh untranslateable, for they contain a subtle and intricate allegory, by means of which the grace of the manifested Shivan, who is praised under the title of the 'Cloud' is set forth. The idea is that the Infinite sea of rapturous supreme felicity is Civan, but - as the Cloud in the monsoon season sucks up water from the sea, and rises in black masses that cover the sky, while all the phenomena of the wonderful outburst of the beneficient, but also fearful, monsoon are exhibited - so does the Supreme manifest Himself as the Guru, the Object of Love, and Give of grace to His worshippers..."

== Other works ==
In 1921, an English translation of the hymns by Sambandhar, Apparswami, Sundaramurthi was done by Francis Kingsbury and GE Phillips, both of United Theological College, Bangalore (Edited by Fred Goodwill) and published in a book as Hymns of the Tamil Śaivite Saints, by the Oxford University Press.

Noted Tamil film music composer Ilayaraja had composed Thiruvasagam in Symphony from the verses of Manikkavacakar's Thiruvasagam as a tribute to the saint and Tamil itself. All songs are orchestral renditions of the verses of Thiruvasagam.

== In culture ==
Ramalinga Swamigal (1823-1874 CE) is believed to have taken inspiration from Thiruvasagam for his devotional work.

Portions of Thiruvasagam are also read out by the Chief Brahmin Priest of Thailand during the coronation ceremony of a new Thai King. The ancestors of the Brahmins of the Thai Royal Household are thought to have emigrated from Rameswaram to Thailand centuries back.

== List of temple revered in Thiruvasagam ==
S.No.	Name of the temple	Location	Photo	Presiding deity	Notes/Beliefs
1	Nataraja Temple, Chidambaram	Chidambaram, Cuddalore district Tamil Nadu; 11°23′58″N 79°41′36″E		Sivakami and Natajar	Thillai Nataraja temple dedicated to Nataraja – Shiva as the lord of dance. The temple is considered the centre of Shaivism. Chidambaram, the name of the city and the temple literally means "atmosphere of wisdom" or "clothed in thought", the temple architecture symbolizes the connection between the arts and spirituality, creative activity and the divine. The temple wall carvings display all the 108 karanas from the Natya Shastra by Bharata Muni, and these postures form a foundation of Bharatanatyam, a classical Indian dance. The temple is one of the five elemental lingas in the Shaivism pilgrimage tradition, and considered the subtlest of all Shiva temples (Kovil) in Hinduism. It is also a site for performance arts, including the annual Natyanjali dance festival on Maha Shivaratri.
2	Sattainathar Temple, Sirkazhi	Sirkazhi, Nagapattinam district Tamil Nadu; 11°14′16.96″N 79°44′21.45″E		Periyanayagi and Sattainathar	The temple has three levels with Bhramapureeswarar shrine in the lower level, Periyanakar with Periyanayaki on a Thoni in the second level and Sattainathar/Vatukanathar in the third level. Three different forms of Shiva are worshipped here, the lingam (Bhrammapureeswarar), a colossal image of Uma Maheswarar (Toniappar) at the medium level, and Bhairavar (Sattanathar) at the upper level. The temple is associated with the legend of child Sambandar who is believed to have been fed by Parvati on the banks of the temple tank. The child later went on to compose Tevaram, a Shaiva canonic literature on Shiva and became one of the most revered Shaiva poets in South India.
3	Annamalaiyar Temple	Tiruvannamalai, Tiruvannamalai district Tamil Nadu; 12°13′54.76″N 79°03′59.83″E		Unnamalaiyamman and Annamalaiyar	It is significant to the Hindu sect of Shaivism as one of the temples associated with the five elements, the Pancha Bhoota Stalas, and specifically the element of fire, or Agni. Shiva is worshiped as Arunachalesvara or Annamalaiyar, and is represented by the lingam, with his idol referred to as Agni lingam. His consort Parvati is depicted as Unnamalai Amman. The presiding deity is revered in the 7th century Tamil Shaiva canonical work, the Tevaram, written by Tamil saint poets known as the Nayanars and classified as Paadal Petra Sthalam. The 3rd century CE, Shaiva saint poet Manikkavacakar composed the Tiruvempaavai here.
4	Vedagiriswarar temple	Thirukalukundram, Chengalpattu district Tamil Nadu; 12°36′35.77″N 80°03′32.94″E		Thirupurasundari and Vedagiriswarar	The word Thirukazhukundram comes from the Tamil words Thiru (Respectful), Kazhugu (Vulture/Eagle), Kundram (mount). It was known as "Thirukazhugukundram" in ancient times, which over time became Thirukazhukundram. The town is also known as Pakshi Theertham (Bird's Holy Lake) because of a pair of birds -Most likely Egyptian vultures- that are believed to have visited the site for centuries. These birds are traditionally fed by the temple priests and arrive before noon to feed on offerings made from rice, wheat, ghee and sugar.
5	Thyagaraja Temple, Tiruvarur	Thiruvarur, Thiruvarur district Tamil Nadu; 10°46′33.99″N 79°37′58.80″E		Kamalambal and Thygarajar	The main idol of worship is Tyagarajar, depicted as a Somaskanda form. The temple complex covers 30 acres, and is one of the largest in India. It houses nine gateway towers known as gopurams. The temple has the largest chariot in Asia and the annual Chariot festival is celebrated during the month of April. The temple has nine gopurams, 80 vimanas, twelve temple walls, 13 halls, fifteen large temple water bodies, three gardens, and three large precincts.
6	Mangalanathaswamy temple	Uthirakosamangai, Ramanathapuram district Tamil Nadu; 09°18′57.14″N 78°44′15.04″E		Mangalambigai and Mangaleswarar	Manikkavacakar, the 9th century Tamil Shaivite saint poet has revered Mangalanathar and the temple in his verses in Thiruvasakam, compiled as the Eighth Tirumurai. Arunagirinathar, a 15th-century Tamil poet has composed Tamil hymns glorifying Murugan in the temple. There is a 6 ft (1.8 m) tall ancient maragatha Nataraja idol carved out of emerald inside the temple. A hall of Saharasralingam has thousand lingams enshrined in it. At the entrance of the main precinct, the temple features exquisite stone carvings of Yali (mythological dragon), depicted with a rolling stone ball inside its mouth.
7	Tirupperunturai	Avudaiyarkoil, Pudukkottai district Tamil Nadu; 10°04′33.26″N 79°02′35.17″E		Athmanadaswamy temple	One of the sacred books of Tamil Shaiva Siddhanta, Manikkavacakar's Thiruvasagam, originated from this shrine. Manikkavacakar is said to have converted the king to the religion of Shiva and built the temple with money that had been intended for war-horses. Athmanathar temple is a testimony to the temple architectural skills of ancient Tamil Sculptors and engineers. The temple covers an area of over 10 acres (40,000 m^{2}) with three enclosures and faces south, constructed so that the setting sun strikes the sanctum even though it is cloistered within three circumambulatory paths. The presiding deity is formless (Atmanatar); there is no lingam but only a pedestal {Avudayar} located in the sanctum, hence the name Avudayar Koil. The God faces South in this temple- in Dakshinamurthy or Guru form. His consort is worshipped as Shiva Yoga Nayaki(Yogambal) in iconless form. There is no Nandi bull icon as is conventional in almost all Shiva temples. There is deep spiritual significance in this. Hinduism allows deity worship for the novice. As one's devotion matures, one begins to contemplate the truth of formlessness of the Brahman. The temple has been designed to illustrate this theology. This one of the rarest Shaivite shrine in whole of India to portray the supreme truth symbolically. Since the soul (atma) has no form, the deity is called Athmanathar. There are five lamps in the sanctum indicating the five time scales and 27 lamps indicating the 27 stars.
