= Nambiyandar Nambi =

Eleventh-century Indian scholar

Nambiyandar Nambi temple in Thirunarayur

Om symbol Tirumurai Om symbol in Tamil
The twelve volumes of Tamil Śaiva hymns of the sixty-three Nayanars
Parts	Name	Author
1,2,3	(Tevaram) Thirukkadaik Kaappu	Sambandar
4,5,6	Tevaram	Thirunavukkarasar
7	(Tevaram) Thiruppattu	Sundarar
8	Thiruvasakam & Thirukkovaiyar	Manickavasagar
9	Thiruvisaippa & Thirupallandu	Various
10	Thirumandhiram	Thirumular
11	Saiva Prabandham	Various
12	Periya Puranam	Sekkizhar
Paadal Petra Sthalam
Paadal Petra Sthalam
Rajaraja I
Nambiyandar Nambi

Thirunaraiyur Nambiyandar Nambi was an eleventh-century Shaiva scholar of Tamil Nadu in South India who compiled the hymns of Sambandar, Appar and Sundarar and was himself one of the authors of the eleventh volume of the canon of the Tamil liturgical poetry of Shiva, the Tirumurai.

== Birth and life ==
Nambiyandar Nambi was born in the town of Thirunaraiyur into the tradition of the Adi Shaivites, brahmin priests in the temples of Lord Shiva. In Nambiyandar Nambi Puranam also called as Tirumurai Kanda Puranam, Nambi identifies his patron, the great Arumolivarman alias Rajaraja Chola, as ராசா ராசா மன்னவன் அபயகுல சேகரன் requested him to collect the hymns of the three great poet-saints Sambandar, Appar and Sundarar. Nambi managed to get palm-leaf manuscripts of the hymns, though some had been eaten away by termites. They were able to recover around ten percent of the entire set of hymns. Nambi also wrote a memoir of the lives of the sixty-three great devotees mentioned by Suntarar; the Tiruttondar Tiruvandhadhi. His hymns in praise of Sambandar and Appar provide some biography of those saints.

== Compilation ==
King Rajaraja Chola was on a mission to recover the Tirumurai hymns after hearing short excerpts of Tevaram in his court. He sought the help of Nambi Andar Nambi, who was a priest in a temple. It is believed that by divine intervention Nambi found the presence of scripts, in the form of cadijam leaves half eaten by white ants in a chamber inside the second precinct in Thillai Nataraja Temple, Chidambaram. The brahmanas (Dikshitars) in the temple opposed the mission, but Rajaraja intervened by consecrating the images of the saint-poets through the streets of Chidambaram. Rajaraja thus became known as Tirumurai Kanda Cholan meaning one who saved the Tirumurai. Thus far Shiva temples only had images of god forms, but after the advent of Rajaraja, the images of the Nayanar saints were also placed inside the temple. Nambi arranged the hymns of three saint poets Sampantar, Appar and Sundarar as the first seven books, Manikkavacakar's Tirukovayar and Tiruvacakam as the 8th book, the 28 hymns of nine other saints as the 9th book, the Tirumandiram of Tirumular as the 10th book, 40 hymns by 12 other poets as the 10th book, Tirutondar Tiruvanthathi - the sacred anthathi of the labours of the 63 nayanar saints and added his own hymns as the 11th book. The first seven books were later called as Tevaram, and the whole Saiva canon, to which was added, as the 12th book, Sekkizhar's Periya Puranam (1135 CE) is wholly known as Tirumurai, the holy book. Thus Saiva literature which covers about 600 years of religious, philosophical and literary development.

== Related Devara temple near nambi's village ==
1.kattumannarkoil 8 km 2.Kanattumulloor 9 km 3.Omampuliyur 14 km 4.Melakadambur 14 km from here
