= Sekkilhar =

12th century religious figure

- Sēkkilān Mādēvadigal Rāmadēva
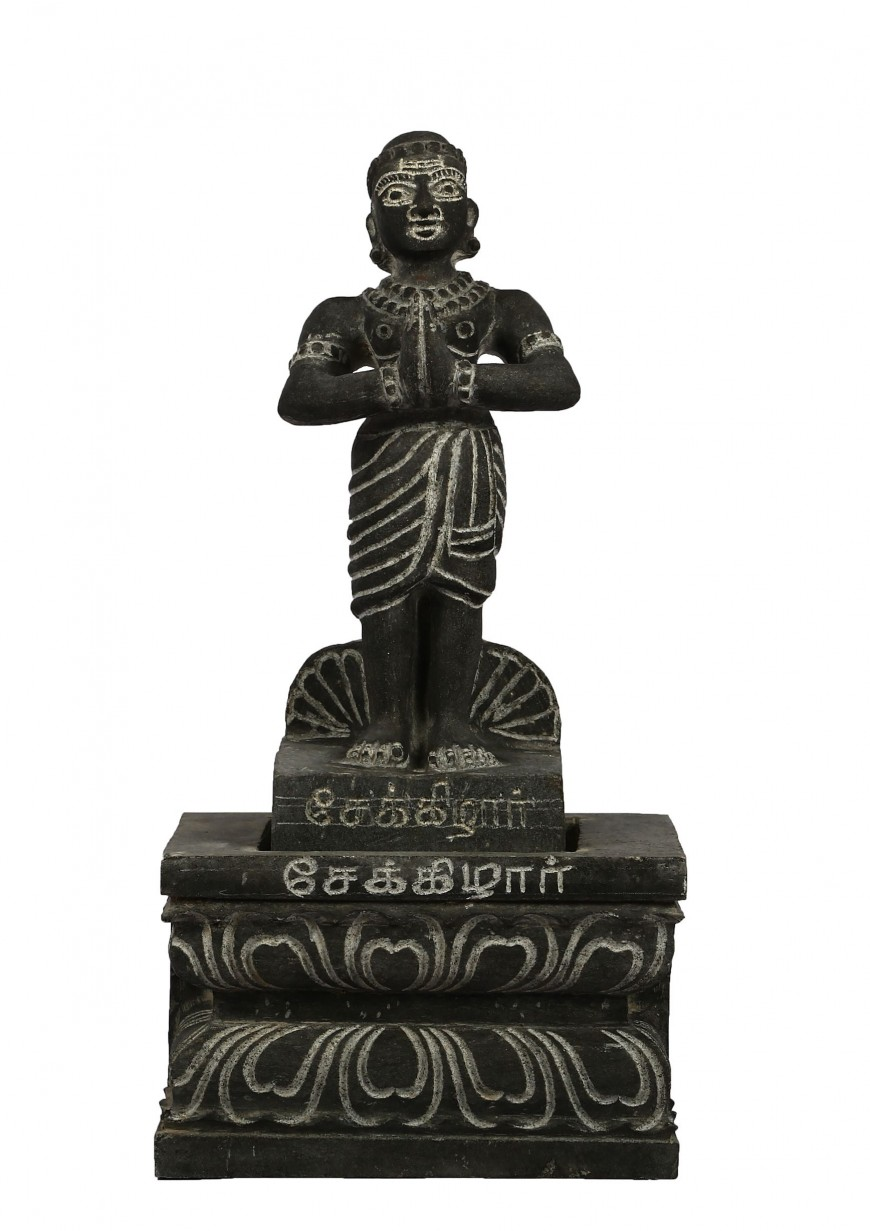

Personal life
- Born: Kundrathur, Jayankonda Cholamandalam, Chola Empire (now in Kanchipuram district, Tamil Nadu, India)
- Flourished: 1133–1150 CE
- Notable work: Periyapuranam
- Honors: Guru Puja in Vaigasi (May–June)

Religious life
- Religion: Hinduism
- Philosophy: Shaivism

Sēkkilān Mādēvadigal Rāmadēva, popularly known as Sekkizhar, was a Hindu saint who lived in 12th century CE. He was the author and compiler of the Periya Puranam, a text recounting the life of the sixty-three Shaiva Nayanars.

== Life ==
Sekkizhār was born into a Vellalar family as Arulmozhithevan, meaning the one of the divine language. He was a native of Kundrathur village (a suburb of present-day Chennai), a sub-division of Puliyur-kottam in Thondaimandalam. Sekkizhār was appointed by Kulothunga Chola II as his Prime Minister on account of his talents. His life is celebrated by Umapati Sivacharya in his fourteenth century work Sekkilhar Nayanar Puranam. Sekkizhār had the title Uttama Chola Pallavan and his brother held the title Tondaiman Pallavaraiyan. Sekkilhar is also called Ganga-kula tilaka (the glory of the Ganga race) and Bagirathi-kula tilaka (the glory of the Bhagiratha race) by Umapati Sivacharya in his work, the Sekkilar Puranam. The Guru Puja festival for Sekkilhar is celebrated annually in the month of Vaigasi-Poosam (May–June).

== Compilation of Periyapuranam ==
Om symbol Tirumurai Om symbol in Tamil
The twelve volumes of Tamil Śaiva hymns of the sixty-three Nayanars
Parts	Name	Author
1,2,3	(Tevaram) Thirukkadaik Kaappu	Sambandar
4,5,6	Tevaram	Thirunavukkarasar
7	(Tevaram) Thiruppattu	Sundarar
8	Thiruvasakam & Thirukkovaiyar	Manickavasagar
9	Thiruvisaippa & Thirupallandu	Various
10	Thirumandhiram	Thirumular
11	Saiva Prabandham	Various
12	Periya Puranam	Sekkizhar
Paadal Petra Sthalam
Paadal Petra Sthalam
Rajaraja I
Nambiyandar Nambi

Kulothunga Chola II, then a young king, was a devotee of Shiva at Chidambaram and continued the reconstruction of the centre of Tamil Shaivism that was begun by his ancestors. At the same time, he was very interested in the highly erotic Jain epic Jivaka Chintamani. Sekkilhar, upon noticing this, advised the king to instead turn his attention to the lives of the Shaiva saints as described by Sundarar in his Tiruthondar Thogai.

The king thereupon invited Sekkilhar to expound the lives of the Shaiva saints in a great poem. He composed the Periyapuranam or the Great Narrative about the lives of the sixty-three Nayanars or saints and would himself sing it in the Thousand Pillared Hall of the Chidambaram temple and arouse the latent Chola Shaiva zeal.

According to folklore, when Sekkilhar sat pondering at Chidambaram temple as to how to begin his work, Shiva appeared and said his first verse should be:

Ulakellam unarnthu otharkku ariyavan
Nilavulaviya neermali veniyan
Alakil jothiyan ambalatthu aaduvan
malar chilambadi vaazhthi vanakuvom

Translation:

He who is known to those who forsake attachments
He who is of plaited locks of hair in which river flows and baby moon grazes
He who is verily sublime light and who dances in the golden hall of chidambaram
lets worship his rosy anklet girt feet

Kulothunga Chola II was so moved upon hearing the Periyapuranam that he placed the poem and Sekkilhar on the royal elephant and took them out on a grand procession around the streets of Chidambaram, the king himself waved the fly-whisks and showered Sekkilhar with honors. This work is considered the most important initiative of Kulothunga Chola II's reign. Although it is only a literary embellishment of earlier hagiographies of the Shaiva saints, it came to be seen as the epitome of Chola literary style. Among all the hagiographic Puranas in Tamil, the Periyapuranam (or Tiruttondar Puranam) stands first. The Periyapuranam is considered a fifth Veda in the Tamil language and it immediately took its place as the twelfth and the last book in the Shaiva canon.

== Temples for Sekkilhar ==
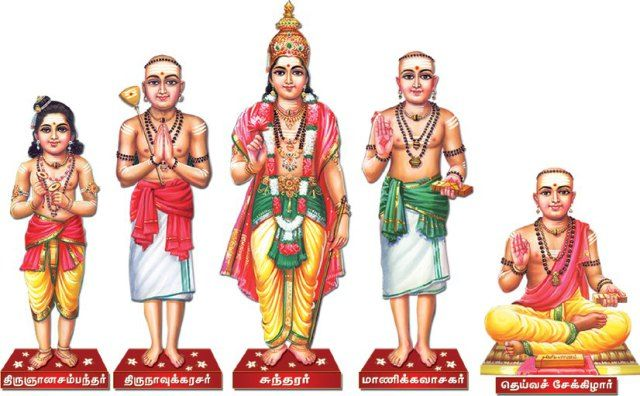
Sekkilhar Peruman

As per an inscription from Srivanjiyam, Sekkilhar was deified and provisions were made for the worship of his idol by a person called Anapaayan.

There are temples dedicated to Sekkilhar. These include the Kundrathur Sekkilhar Temple at Kundrathur, Chennai, and the Devakottai Nagara Sivan Kovil (also called the "Sekkilhar Kovil") in the Chettinad region of Sivagangai district in Tamil Nadu, where Saint Sekkilhar is the procession deity.

== Research Centre ==
The Sekkilhar Research Centre conducts research on his epic Periyapuranam and the period, art, culture, civilisation, rituals, socioeconomic conditions, and religion/secularism of the times and place surrounding it.
