= Vagisa Munivar =

Vagisa Munivar also spelled as Vageesa Munivar is said to have lived in the 12th Century. He is the author of Gnanamrutham (Ambrosia of knowledge) also spelled as Gnanamritham, Jnanamrtam or Nanamridham, an important work of medieval Shaiva literature written in Tamil.

Gnanmritham is divided into 8 parts:

1. Sammiya Gnanam
2. Sammiya Darisnam
3. Pasa Bandham
4. Degaantharam
5. Pasanadittuvam
6. Pasaceddam
7. Patinicaayam
8. Pasamochanam
