= Tirumurai =

Tamil Hindu Shaivite text

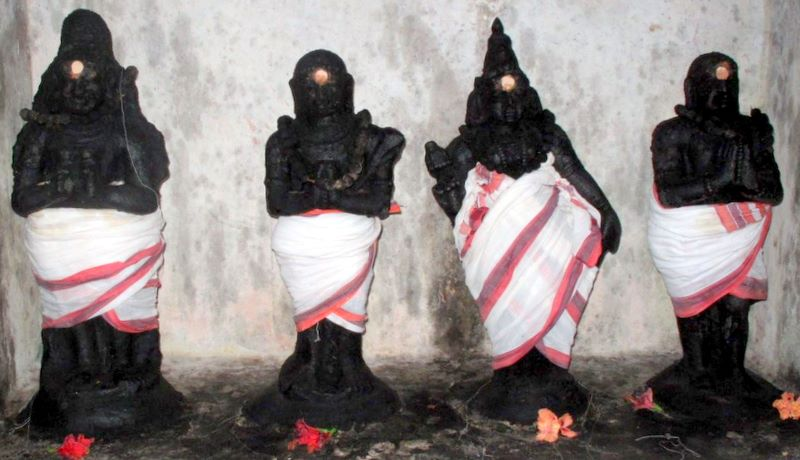
The four foremost Nayanars with Manikkavaasakar - collectively called the நால்வர்: (from left) Sambandar, Appar, Sundarar, Manikkavachakar.

Om symbol Tirumurai Om symbol in Tamil
The twelve volumes of Tamil Śaiva hymns of the sixty-three Nayanars
| Parts | Name | Author |
| 1,2,3 | (Tevaram) Thirukkadaik Kaappu | Sambandar |
| 4,5,6 | Tevaram | Thirunavukkarasar |
| 7 | (Tevaram) Thiruppattu | Sundarar |
| 8 | Thiruvasakam & Thirukkovaiyar | Manickavasagar |
| 9 | Thiruvisaippa & Thirupallandu | Various |
| 10 | Thirumandhiram | Thirumular |
| 11 | Saiva Prabandham | Various |
| 12 | Periya Puranam | Sekkizhar |
Paadal Petra Sthalam
Paadal Petra Sthalam
Rajaraja I
Nambiyandar Nambi

Topics in Tamil literature
Sangam Literature
Five Great Epics
| Silappatikaram | Manimekalai |
| Civaka Cintamani | Valayapathi |
| Kundalakesi |
Five Minor Epics
| Neelakesi | Culamani |
| Naga Kumara Kaviyam | Udayana Kumara Kaviyam |
| Yashodhara Kaviyam |
Bhakti Literature
| Naalayira Divya Prabandham | Kamba Ramayanam |
| Tevaram | Tirumurai |
Tamil people
| Sangam | Sangam landscape |
| Tamil history from Sangam literature | Ancient Tamil music |
| Religion in ancient Tamilakam |

Thirumurai (Tamil: திருமுறை, meaning "The Holy way") is a twelve-volume compendium of songs or hymns in praise of Siva in the Tamil language from the 6th to the 11th century CE by various poets in Tamil Nadu. Nambiyandar Nambi compiled the first seven volumes by Appar, Sambandar, and Sundarar as Thevaram during the 12th century. During the course of time, a strong necessity was felt by scholars to compile Saiva literature to accommodate other works. Thiruvasakam and Thirukovayar by Manickavasagar are included as the eighth, nine parts are compiled as the ninth Tirumurai out of which most are unknown, and the tenth as Thirumandiram by Thirumular, the famous Siddhar. The eleventh is compiled by Karaikal Ammaiyar, Cheraman Perumal and others. The contemporary Chola king was impressed by the work of Nambi and included Nambi's work in the eleventh Tirumurai. Sekkizhar's Periya Puranam, composed a century later, contains the life depiction of all the 63 Nayanmars. The response for the work was so tremendous among Shaiva scholars and Kulothunga Chola II that it was included as the 12th Thirumurai. Thirumurai along with Vedas and Saiva agamas form the basis of Saiva Siddantha philosophy in South India and Sri Lanka.

== History and background ==
The Pallava period in the history of the Tamil land is a period of religious revival of Saivism by the Saivite Nayanars who by their Bhakti hymns captured the hearts of the people. They made a tremendous impression on the people by singing the praise of Siva in soul-stirring devotional hymns. Thirumurai in anthology supersedes Sangam literature, which is predominantly secular in nature. The entire Thirumurai is in viruttam meter or lines of four. The principal characteristics of the head-rhyming is influenced both by syllabic and moric prosody.

== Poets ==
| Tirumurai | Hymns | Period | Author |
|---|---|---|---|
| 1,2,3 | Tevaram | 7th century CE | Sambandar |
| 4,5,6 | Tevaram | 7th century CE | Appar |
| 7 | Tevaram | 8th century CE | Sundarar |
| 8 | Thiruvasakam and Thirukkovaiyar | 9th century CE | Manikkavacakar |
| 9 | Thiruvisaippa | 9th century CE | Thirumalikaittever |
| 9 | Thiruvisaippa | 9th century CE | Centanar |
| 9 | Thiruvisaippa | 9th century CE | Karuvurttevar |
| 9 | Thiruvisaippa | 9th century CE | Nampikatava nampi |
| 9 | Thiruvisaippa | 9th century CE | Gandaraditya |
| 9 | Thiruvisaippa | 9th century CE | Venattatikal |
| 9 | Thiruvisaippa | 9th century CE | Tiruvaliyamutanar |
| 9 | Thiruvisaippa | 9th century CE | Purutottama nampi |
| 9 | Thiruvisaippa | 9th century CE | Cetirayar |
| 10 | Thirumandiram | 8th century CE | Tirumular |
| 11 | Prabandham | | |
| 11 | Prabandham | | Karaikkal Ammaiyar |
| 11 | Prabandham | | Ceraman Perumal Nayanar |
| 11 | Prabandham | | Pattinattu Pillaiyar |
| 11 | Prabandham | | Nakkiratevar Nayanar |
| 11 | Prabandham | | Kapilateva Nayanar |
| 11 | Prabandham | | Thiruvalaviyudaiyar |
| 11 | Prabandham | | Nampiyantarnampi |
| 11 | Prabandham | | IyyadigalkatavarkonNayanar |
| 11 | Prabandham | | Kalladateva Nayanar |
| 11 | Prabandham | | Paranateva Nayanar |
| 11 | Prabandham | | Ellamperuman Adigal |
| 11 | Prabandham | | Athiravadigal |
| 12 | Periya Puranam | 12th century CE | Sekkizhar |

== Hymns ==
The Saiva Thirumurais are twelve in number. The first seven Tirumurais are the hymns of the three great Nayanars - Sambandar, Appar and Sundarar. These hymns were the best musical compositions of their age.

The first three Thirumurais (meaning parts) of Thevaram are composed by Sambanthar, the next three by Appar and the seventh one is composed by Sundarar. Appar and Sambanthar lived around the 7th century, while Sundarar lived in the 8th century. During the Pallava period these three travelled extensively around Tamil Nadu offering discourses and songs characterised by an emotional devotion to Shiva. Their hymns include allegations against Jain monks and criticism of Jainism.

Sambanthar was a 7th-century child poet-saint who died at the age of 16 in 655 CE. His verses were set to tune by Nilakantaperumalanar who is set to have accompanied the poet on his yal or lute. The first three volumes of Tirumurai contain 383 hymns. Appar (alias Tirunavukkarasar) was born in the middle of the 7th century in Tiruvamur, Tamil Nadu, and lived about 81 years. He converted to Jainism as a youth, became the head of a Jain monastery over time, but then returned to Shaivism. Tirumurai contains 313 hymns of Appar over volumes 4-7. His hymns are highly devotional, with some containing criticism of Jainism as he experienced it. Sundarar (alias Sundaramurthi) was born towards the end of the 7th century. He is the author of 100 hymns compiled as the 7th Tirumurai.

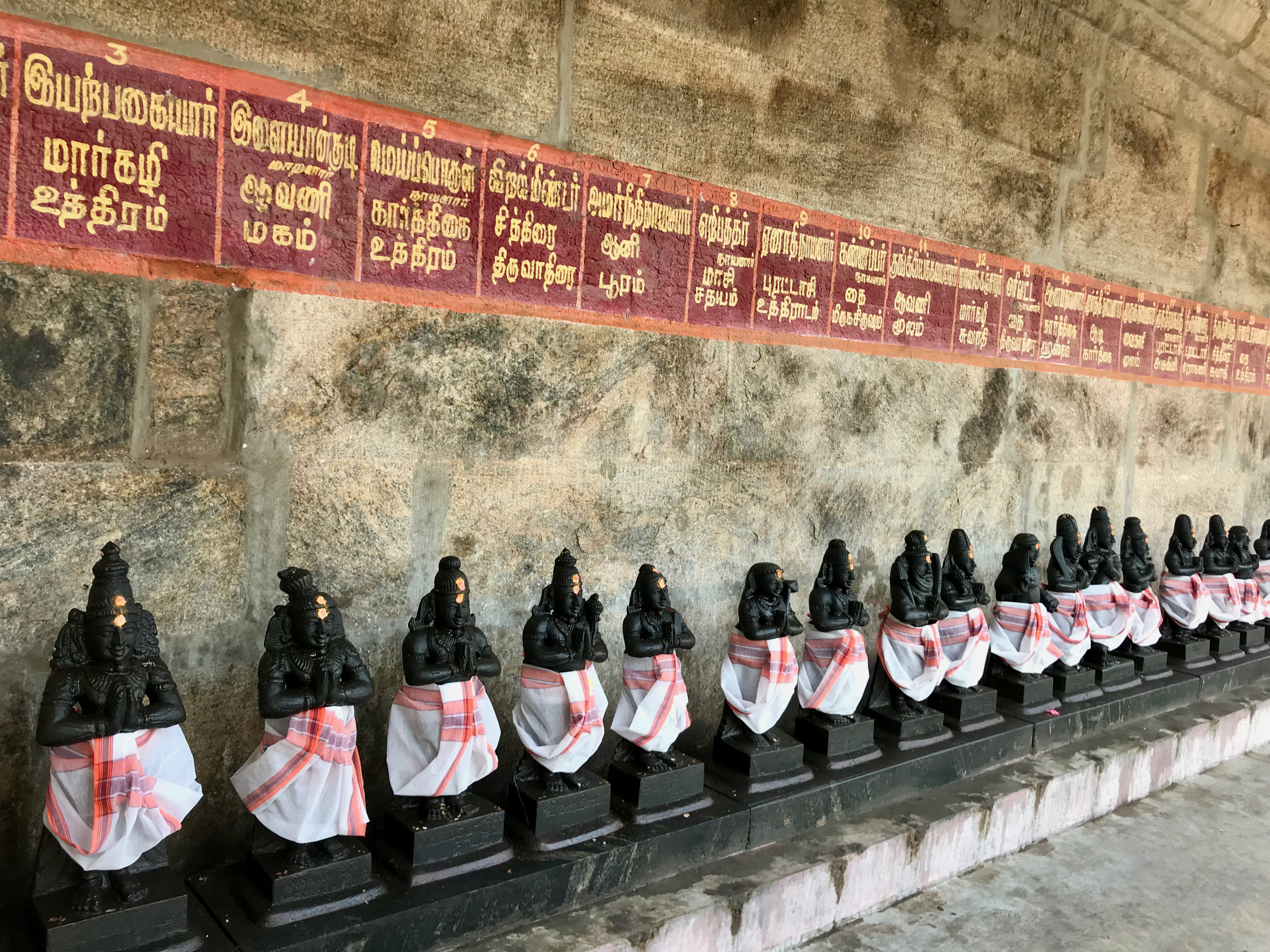
Saiva Siddhanta temples celebrate the Nayanars tradition behind the Tirumurai. Above Nayanars gallery at the Thiruthalinathar Shiva temple, (Tirupathur).

Manikkavasagar's Tiruvasakam and Tirukovayar are compiled as the eighth Tirumurai and is full of visionary experience, divine love and urgent striving for truth. Manickavasagar was the Pandya King Varaguna II's prime minister and renounced his post in search of divinity.

The ninth Tirumurai has been composed by Tirumalikaittever, Sundarar, Karuvurttevar, Nambiyaandar Nambi, Gandaraditya, Venattatikal, Tiruvaliyamutanar, Purutottama Nambi and Cetirayar. Among these the notable is Gandaraditya (950-957 CE), a Chola king who later became a Saivite saint.

Tirumandiram by Tirumular unfolds siddantha (attainment) as a fourfold path - virtuous and moral living, temple worship, internal worship and union with Siva. Tirumular worked out an original philosophical system, and the southern school of Saiva siddantha draws its authority from Tirumandiram, a work of 3000 verses. Tirumandiram represents another school of thought detailing agamic traditions, which run parallel to the bhakthi movement. It does not glorify temples or deities as in the case of other Tirumurais.

The eleventh Tirumurai was composed by Karaikkal Ammaiyar, Cheraman Perumal, Pattinattu p-pillaiyar, Nakkiratevar, Kapilateva, Tiruvalavaiyudaiyar, Nampiyantarnampi, Iyyadigal katavarkon, Kalladateva, Paranateva, Ellamperuman Adigal and Athirava Adigal. Nambi's Tirutottanar Tiruvanthathi followed an exclusive style of mincing Tamil and Sanskrit verses in anthati meter similar to Tevaram of the trio. Karaikkal Ammaiyar (550-600 CE) is the earliest of the woman Saivite poets who introduced the kattalai-k-kali-t-turai meter, which is a complicated structural departure from the old classical Tamil meters. The other meter used by Ammaiyar was an old venba and also an antathi arrangement in which the offset of one line or stanza is identical with the onset of the next line or stanza.

Periya Puranam (Tamil:பெரிய‌ புராண‌ம்), the great purana or epic, sometimes also called Tiruttontarpuranam (read as "Tiru-Thondar-Puranam") (the purana of the holy devotees) is a Tamil poetic mythistory depicting the legendary lives of the sixty-three Nayanars, the canonical poets of Tamil Shaivism. It was compiled during the 12th century by Sekkizhar. It provides evidence of trade with West Asia. Sekkizhar compiled and wrote the Periya Puranam listing the life stories of the sixty-three Shaiva Nayanars, poets of the God Shiva who composed the liturgical poems of the Tirumurai, and was later himself canonised and the work became part of the sacred canon. Sekkizhar was a poet and the chief minister in the court of the Chola King, Kulothunga Chola II.

== Compilation ==
Raja Raja Chola I (985-1013 CE) embarked on a mission to recover the hymns after hearing short excerpts of Tevaram in his court. He sought the help of Nambi Andar Nambi, who was a priest in a temple. It is believed that by divine intervention Nambi found the presence of scripts, in the form of cadijam leaves half eaten by white ants in a chamber inside the second precinct in Thillai Nataraja Temple, Chidambaram. The brahmanas (Dikshitars) in the temple informed the king about the tradition that only when all three poets come together, that the chamber can be opened, and Rajaraja found a worakaround by consecrating the images of the saint-poets through the streets of Chidambaram. Rajaraja thus became known as Tirumurai Kanda Cholan meaning one who (re)discovered the Tirumurai. Thus far Shiva temples only had images of god forms, but after the advent of Rajaraja, the images of the Nayanar saints were also placed inside the temple. Nambi arranged the hymns of three saint poets Sampantar, Appar and Sundarar as the first seven books, Manickavasagar's Tirukovayar and Tiruvacakam as the 8th book, the 28 hymns of nine other saints as the 9th book, the Tirumandiram of Tirumular as the 10th book, 40 hymns by 12 other poets as the 10th book, Tirutotanar Tiruvanthathi - the sacred anthathi of the labours of the 63 Nayanar saints, and added his own hymns as the 11th book. The first seven books were later called Tevaram, and the whole Saiva canon, to which was added, as the 12th book, Sekkizhar's Periya Puranam (1135 CE) is wholly known as Tirumurai, the holy book. Thus Saiva literature which covers about 600 years of religious, philosophical and literary development.

== Temples revered ==
Paadal Petra Sthalams are 276 temples that are revered in the verses of Tevaram and are amongst the greatest Shiva temples of the continent. Vaippu Sthalangal are places that were mentioned casually in the songs in Tevaram. The focus of the moovars' (first three poets) hymns suggests darshan (seeing and being seen by God) within the puja (worship) offering. The hymnists made classificatory lists of places like katu (for forest), turai (port or refuge), kulam (water tank) and kalam (field) being used - thus both structured and unstructured places in the religious context find a mention in Tevaram. The temples mentioned in the works of the 9th Tirumarai, Thiruvisaippa, are in turn referred to as Tiruvisaipa Thalangal. The shrine of Gangaikonda Cholapuram are revered as under
" He of the Shrine of Gangaikonda Choleswaram takes whatever forms that his worship visualize" - 131,5.

== In culture ==
Tirumurai was one of the reasons for converting Vedic ritual to Agamic puja followed in Shiva temples. Though these two systems are overlapping, Agamic tradition ensures the perpetuation of the Vedic religion's emphasis on the efficacy of ritual as per Davis. Odhuvars, Sthanikars, or Kattalaiyars offer musical programmes in Shiva temples of Tamil Nadu by singing Tevaram after the daily rituals. These are usually carried out as a chorus programme soon after the divine offering. There are records from Kulothunga Chola III from Nallanyanar temple in South Arcot indicating singing of Tiruvempavai and Tiruvalam of Manickavasagar during special occasions in the temple. From the 13th century, the texts were passed on to the Odhuvars by the Adheenams or mathas and there was no more control by the kings or the brahmanas. The Odhuvars were from the vellala community and were trained in ritual singing in Tevaram schools.

Periya Puranam, the eleventh-century Tamil book on the Nayanars that forms the last volume of the Tirumurai, primarily had references only to Tevaram and subsequently expanded to 12 parts and is one of the first anthologies of Tirumurai. One of the first anthologies of moovars' hymns called the Tevara Arulmuraitirattu is linked to Tamil Saiva siddhantha philosophy by grouping ninety-nine verses into 10 categories. The category headings are God, soul, bond, grace, guru, methodology, enlightenment, bliss, mantra and liberation - corresponding to Umapthi's work, Tiruvarutpayan. Tirumurai kanda puranam is another anthology for Tirumurai as a whole, but primarily focuses on Tevaram. It is the first of the works to refer the collection of volumes as Tirumurai.
