= Tiruvicaippa =

Tamil Hindu text

Om symbol Tirumurai Om symbol in Tamil
The twelve volumes of Tamil Śaiva hymns of the sixty-three Nayanars
Parts	Name	Author
1,2,3	(Tevaram) Thirukkadaik Kaappu	Sambandar
4,5,6	Tevaram	Thirunavukkarasar
7	(Tevaram) Thiruppattu	Sundarar
8	Thiruvasakam & Thirukkovaiyar	Manickavasagar
9	Thiruvisaippa & Thirupallandu	Various
10	Thirumandhiram	Thirumular
11	Saiva Prabandham	Various
12	Periya Puranam	Sekkizhar
Paadal Petra Sthalam
Paadal Petra Sthalam
Rajaraja I
Nambiyandar Nambi

Tiruvicaippa (Tamil: திருவிசைப்பா, romanized: Tiruvicaippā) denotes the ninth volumes of the Tirumurai, the twelve-volume collection of Tamil Shaiva devotional poetry. The works of eight authors belonging to the 10th century, namely Thirumaligai Thevar, Senthanar, Karuvur Thevar, Ponnthuruthi Nambi Kata Nambi, Kandarathithar, Venattadigal, Thiruvaliyamuthanar, Purshottama Nambi, Sethiyar, and Senthanar. Out of the eight, Kandarathithar, was a Chola king, who an ardent devotee of Shiva. He wanted to compile Tevaram, but the mission was completed by his grandson Rajaraja I.

== Content ==
The ninth volume of Tirumurai is composed by Tamil poets (known as Nayanars) - Thirumaligai Thevar, Senthanar, Karuvur Thevar, Ponnthuruthi Nambi Kata Nambi, Kandarathithar, Venattadigal, Thiruvaliyamuthanar, Purshottama Nambi, Sethiyar and Senthanar Among the eight, Kandarathithar, was a prince descended from Chola king, Parantaka I. He and his wife Sembian Mahadevi were ardent devotees of Shiva and wanted to compile Tevaram during his lifetime, but could not complete the mission. During the reign of Rajaraja Chola I in the 10th century, a collection of these songs was found abandoned in the Chidambaram temple, along with other religious literary works, and collated by Nambiyandar Nambi.

Author	Poems	Number of verses	Classification	Temples reverred
Thirumaligai Thevar	1-45	45	Tiruvicaippa	Thillai Natarajar Temple (45)
Senthanar	46–79	34	Tiruvicaippa	Veezhinathar Kovil, Thiruveezhimizhalai (12), Masilamaniswara Temple (11)
Karuvur Thevar	80–182	103	Tiruvicaippa	Thillai Natarajar Temple (11), Maniyambalam temple (11), Azhagiyanathaswamy temple Thirukalanthai (10), Sundaresawarar temple Thirulogi (11), Pannakaparanar temple Thirumugathalai (10), Kampaheswarar Temple (10), Brihadisvara Temple (11)
Ponnthuruthi Nambi Kata Nambi	183–194	12	Tiruvicaippa	Thillai Natarajar Temple (10), Thyagaraja temple (2), Thirukuraithudayar temple (11)
Kandarathithar	194–204	10	Tiruvicaippa	Thillai Natarajar Temple (10)
Venattadigal	205–214	10	Tiruvicaippa	Thillai Natarajar Temple (10)
Thiruvaliyamuthanar	215–256	42	Tiruvicaippa	Thillai Natarajar Temple (42)
Purshottama Nambi	1-45	257–278	Tiruvicaippa	Thillai Natarajar Temple (22)
Sethiyar	279–288	10	Tiruvicaippa	Thillai Natarajar Temple (10)
Senthanar	289–301	13	Tirupallantu	Thillai Natarajar Temple (13)

== List of temples associated with the Tiruvicaippa ==
There are 14 temples revered by the hymns of Tiruvicaippa and are in turn referred as "Tiruvisaipa Talangal".

Name of the temple	Location	Presiding deity	Photo	Poets	Temple details
Thillai Natarajar Temple	Chidambaram 11°23′58″N 79°41′36″E	Natarajar		Kandarathithar (10), Karuvur Thevar (11), Ponnthuruthi Nambi Kata Nambi (10), Purshottama Nambi (22), Senthanar (13), Sethiyar (10), Thirumaligai Thevar (45), Thiruvaliyamuthanar (42), Venattadigal (10)	The temple is one of the five elemental lingas in the Shaiva pilgrimage tradition and is considered the subtlest of all Shiva temples (Kovil) in Hinduism. It is also a site for performance arts, including the annual Natyanjali dance festival on Maha Shivaratri.
Brihadisvara Temple	Gangaikonda Cholapuram 11°12′22″N 79°26′56″E	Brihadisvarar		Karuvur Thevar (11)	Completed in 1035 AD by Rajendra Chola I as a part of his new capital, this Chola dynasty era temple is similar in design, and has a similar name, as the older 11th century, Brihadeeswarar Temple about 70 kilometres (43 mi) to the southwest in Thanjavur. The shrine of Gangaikonda Cholapuram are revered as under " He of the Shrine of Gangaikonda Choleswaram takes whatever forms that his worship visualize" - 131,5.
Rajarajeswaram	Thanjavur 10°46′58″N 79°07′54″E	Brihadisvarar		Karuvur Thevar (11)	Built by Tamil king Raja Raja Chola I between 1003 and 1010 AD, the temple is a part of the UNESCO World Heritage Site known as the "Great Living Chola Temples". Built out of granite, the vimana tower above the shrine is one of the tallest in South India.
Uthrapathiswaraswamy Temple	Thanjavur 10°51′48″N 79°43′20″E	Uthrapathiswaraswamy		Karuvur Thevar (10)	Uthrapathiswaraswamy Temple is a Hindu temple in Tiruchenkattankudi in Nagapattinam district in the Tamil Nadu state of India. Though it is dedicated to the Hindu god Shiva, it is more famous for its Ganesha (Ganapati) icons brought from Vatapi by Paranjothi, the commander-in-chief of the Pallava king Narasimhavarman I (reign: 630–668 CE), following the conquest of Pallavas over the Chalukyas (642 CE).
Azhagiyanathaswamy temple	Kalanthai 10°31′34″N 79°33′10″E	Azhagiyanathar		Karuvur Thevar (10)	The temple has inscriptions from the period of Rajendra Chola indicating generous contributions to the temple.
Maniyambalam temple	Keezhakottur 10°36′52″N 79°33′55″E	Maniambalanavar		Karuvur Thevar (11)	Since the bell of the elephant Airavata fell here, it came to be known as Maniyambalam.
Sundaresawarar temple	Thirulogi 11°04′51″N 79°29′15″E	Sundareswarar		Karuvur Thevar (11)	
Pannakaparanar Temple	Thirmugathalai 10°33′23″N 79°40′46″E	Pannakaparanar		Karuvur Thevar (10)	
Kampaheswarar Temple	Thirubuvanam 10°59′24″N 79°25′59″E	Kampaheswarar		Karuvur Thevar (10)	The temple was constructed by the Chola king Kulothunga Chola III as a memorial of his successful North Indian campaign. The temple has a shrine for Sharabha, a depiction of Shiva, a part-lion and part-bird beast in Hindu mythology, who, according to Sanskrit literature, is eight-legged and more powerful than a lion or an elephant, possessing the ability to clear a valley in one jump.
Thyagaraja Temple	Thiruvarur 10°46′N 79°39′E	Thyagarajar		Ponnthuruthi Nambi Kata Nambi (2)	According to legend, a Chola king named Muchukunda obtained a boon from Indra (a celestial deity) and wished to receive an image of Thyagaraja Swamy (presiding deity, Shiva in the temple) reposing on the chest of reclining Vishnu. Indra tried to misguide the king and had six other images made, but the king chose the right image and manifested thiyagaraja in Tiruvarur.
Thirukuraithudayar temple	Thiruvidaikazhi 11°02′29″N 79°47′2″E	Thirukuraithudayar		Senthanar (11)	Thiruchendur of the Chola region, where Lord Murugan’s engagement to his consort Deivanai took place. Murugan worshipped Shiva after vanquishing the asura Iraniyan to cleanse his sins. Rahu Bhagavan also performed penance and worshipped Murugan.
Mahalingeswarar Temple	Tiruvidaimaruthur 10°59′40″N 79°27′1″E	Mahalingeswarar		Karuvur Thevar (10)	The Chola prince, it is believed, entered the Mahalingeswarar Temple and prayed to his favourite God, Shiva for relief from the clutches of the malicious rebirth of a dead Brahmin or brahmarakshasa. The Chola prince made his way out through another entrance thereby saving himself.
Masilamaniswara Temple	Thiruvaduthurai 10°29′N 78°41′E	Masilamaniswarar		Senthanar (11)	This is counted as the first mention of portrait installation indicated in an inscription, with the other ones being in Konerirajapuram and Thiruvisanallur temples. The temple has been maintained and administered by the Thiruvaduthurai Adheenam, whose headquarters is located inside the temple.
Veezhinathar Kovil, Thiruveezhimizhalai	Thiruveezhimizhalai 10°46′N 79°50′E	Veezhinathar		Senthanar (12)	Parvati is said to have been reborn as Katyayani and married Shiva here. Vishnu is regarded to have received the Sudarshana Chakra from Shiva after venerating the deity. A panel depicting the divine marriage is seen behind the shivalingam. The mulavar vimanam is believed to be brought here by Vishnu.

== Sources ==
- J. N., Farquhar (1993). Primer of Hinduism. Asian Educational Services. ISBN 9788120608689.
- Mukherjee, Sujit (1998). A Dictionary of Indian Literature: Beginnings-1850. New Delhi: Orient Longman Limited. p. 396. ISBN 81-250-1453-5.
- Coward, Harold G., ed. (1987). Modern Indian responses to religious pluralism. New York: State University of New York. p. 151. ISBN 0-88706-571-6.
