= Cheruvu Kommu Palem =

Cheruvu Kommu Palem is the name of two villages in Prakasam District, Andhra Pradesh, India:

- Cheruvu Kommu Palem, Darsi mandal
- Cheruvu Kommu Palem, Ongole mandal
