= Kasim-Babu Brothers =

Kasim - Babu Brothers
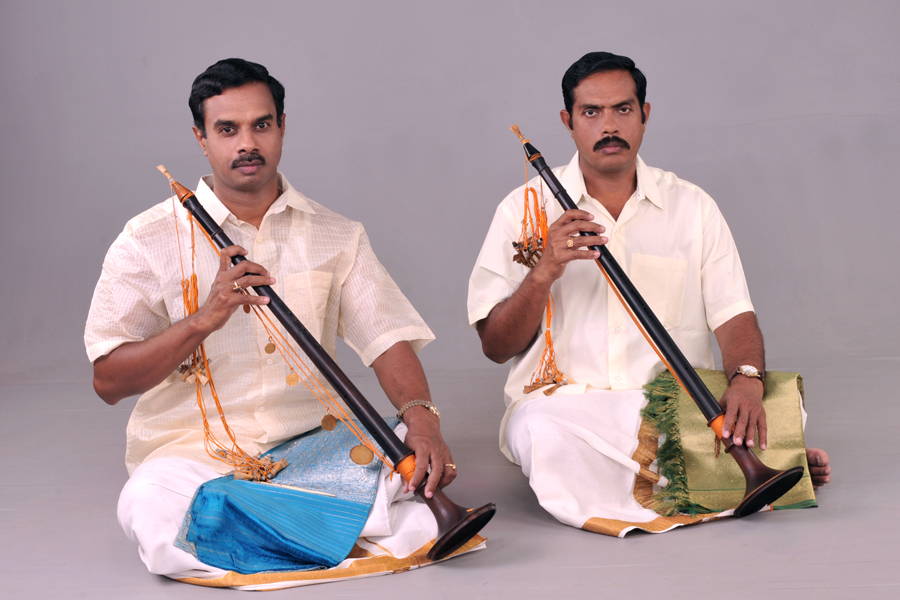

Background information
- Origin: Karavadi, India
- Genres: Carnatic Music
- Occupations: Classic Instrumentalists
- Instruments: Nadhaswaram
- Website: http://www.kasimbabu.org

The Kasim-Babu Brothers are the grandsons and disciples of the Nadhaswaram Maestro Dr. Sheik Chinna Moulana. Today, Kasim-Babu are the front ranking Nadhaswaram artists and torch bearers of Chinna Moulana's tradition. Kasim and Babu are noted for both the raga alapana and kriti rendering (in "gayaki style"), especially Dhikhshithar kritis.

== Early life ==
The brothers are from Karavadi Village, Prakasam District, Andhra Pradesh. They are part of a large family of musicians who have preserved and fostered the art of Nadhaswaram playing for 300 years. Being brothers, they were trained together at a very young age, their preceptor being their own maternal grandfather, Dr. Sheik Chinna Moulana. The brothers have accompanied Dr. Sheik Chinna Moulana for many years during his concerts throughout India and elsewhere.

Kasim, in addition to his skills in Nadhaswaram, also qualified himself academically; He is a graduate of the prestigious St. Joseph's College in Tiruchirappalli, obtaining his B.Sc. in Physics in 1982.

== Career ==
Kasim-Babu have been presenting duet Nadhaswaram concerts for the past 20 years. Kasim is a "Top Grade Artist" while Babu is "A Grade" artist of All India Radio and Doordharshan. Kasim-Babu have visited Sri Lanka, Hong Kong, Russia, Germany, France, U.A.E, Finland, Malaysia, United States, and Canada and earned accolade in their concerts.

The brothers undertook a three-month concert tour of US and Canada from April until June 2006. The initial tour resulted in repetitive invitations for their performances in the subsequent years, and they have become regular performers there.

The brothers have accompanied their grandfather Dr. Sheik Chinna Moulana on several Audio- cassettes and CDs. They have also released their own duet audio Cassettes and CDs.

== Important concerts ==
- South Zone Hook up Concert, National Programs and Akashvani Sangeet Sammelan concerts organized by All India Radio.
- Sangeethostav at Bhopal organized jointly by central Sangeet Natak academy, New Delhi and Ustad Allauddin Khan Sangeet Akademy, Bhopal.
- Kasim-Babu have participated in the "All India Musical Conference on Wind Instruments in Carnatic Music" held at Chembur Fine Arts Society, Mumbai, and presented a Lecture-Demonstration titled "Presentation of Different Technique in Nadhaswaram Playing".
- Participated in the Festival of India in Hong Kong, the Festival of India in Russia and the Festival of India in Germany along with their guru Dr.Sheik Chinna Moulana, organized by the Government of India.
- Participated in the Festival of world music in Finland along with Dr.Sheik Chinna Moulana.
- Participated in many concerts organized by Spic Macay.
- They performed the inaugural concert of the Thyagaraja Aradhana Festival at Cleveland in 2006 and 2011.
- They presented Lecture-Demonstrations at the Department of Music, at Jackson State University in Jackson, Mississippi United States and elsewhere.
- The Brothers have been regular performers in the Thyagaraja Festival in Chicago, organized by Chicago Thyagaraja Utsavam (CTU) since 2006.

== Honors received by the Brothers ==
- The brothers are presently Special Nadhaswaram Artistes of Tirumala Tirupati Devasthanams.
- Kasim-Babu have also been honored and appointed as the "Asthana Vidhwans" of Sri Sharada Peetham of Sringeri Math by Sri Sri Bharati Teertha Mahaswamiji at Sringeri.
- The brothers were conferred with the title of "Nadhaswara Nadhamani" and appointed as the "Asthana Vidhwan" of Kanchi Kamakoti Mutt by Sri Jayendra Saraswathy Swamy.

== Honors received by Kasim ==
- Kasim won the music scholarship awarded by the Government of India in 1984.
- "Kala Saraswathy" Award has been conferred on him by Mother Teresa at Hyderabad in 1987.
- Pongu Tamil Development Trust at Chennai honored Kasim with a gold medal and citation in 2002.
- The much-coveted "Kalaimamani" Award was conferred on him by the Government of Tamil Nadu in November 2003 in a function held at Chennai by the Chief Minister of Tamil Nadu Selvi. J.Jayalaitha.
- Kasim has been appointed as the member of the executive board and Governing body member of South Zone Cultural Center in Thanjavur by the Government of Tamil Nadu.

== Contribution ==
The brothers are running the School "Saradha Nadhaswara Sangeetha Ashram" founded by Dr. Sheik Chinna Moulana, with the main objective of imparting Nadhaswaram training to younger generation. Kasim-Babu have established a trust in memory of their Guru and grandfather Dr. Sheik Chinna Moulana, the "Dr. Chinna Moulana Memorial Trust". The prime objective of the trust is to "globalize the importance of Nadhaswaram Music". The Trust is rendering a noble service by presenting Nadhaswaram instruments to deserving students and also purses to senior indigent artists of the Nadhaswaram fraternity.
