= T. N. Ramachandran (Tamil scholar) =

Indian scholar and translator (1934–2021)

- Born: Thillaisthanam Natarajan Ramachandran; 18 August 1934
- Died: 6 April 2021 (aged 86)
- Other names: Sekkizhaar-Adi-p-Podi; TNR
- Occupations: Lawyer; Tamil scholar; translator; author
- Known for: English translations of Tamil Saiva devotional and philosophical literature
- Notable work: St. Sekkizhar's Periya Puranam; Tirukkovaiyar; Bharati Patalkal

Thillaisthanam Natarajan Ramachandran (18 August 1934 – 6 April 2021), widely known as Sekkizhaar-Adi-p-Podi, was an Indian lawyer, Tamil scholar, author and translator known for his English translations of Tamil Saiva devotional and philosophical literature. His translations included Sekkizhar's Periya Puranam, Manikkavacakar's Tirukkovaiyar and Tiruvachakam, works from the Tirumurai canon and several Saiva Siddhanta texts. He also translated and edited works of Subramania Bharati.

T. N. Ramachandran served as honorary director of the International Institute of Saiva Siddhanta Research at Dharmapuram Adheenam and founded the Saint Sekkizhar School of Saiva Siddhanta in Thanjavur. In 2021, SASTRA Deemed University acquired his personal library of more than 35,000 books and established a memorial endowment in his name.

== Early life and legal career ==
T. N. Ramachandran was born on 18 August 1934 in Thiru Nallam (now known as Konerirajapuram), a village then in Thanjavur district (now in Mayiladuthurai district), Tamil Nadu. He spent his childhood and early life in Thillaisthanam, near Thanjavur, which is reflected in his full name Thillaisthanam Natarajan Ramachandran; a 2022 biographical profile by A. Ka. Perumal also associates his family with Thillaisthanam, near Tiruvaiyaru. He attended Srinivasa Rao High School in Tiruvaiyaru, studied commerce at St. Joseph's College, Tiruchirappalli, and later studied law at Madras Law College.

He enrolled as an advocate and practised in Thanjavur. Perumal records that T. N. Ramachandran handled civil and temple-related litigation before gradually reducing his court work after 1994 as his literary and scholarly activities increased. His association with the Tamil poet and translator Thiruloka Sitaram was influential in his development as a translator; T. N. Ramachandran contributed to Sitaram's journal Sivaji.

== Scholarship and translations ==
T. N. Ramachandran's scholarship focused on Saiva Siddhanta, the Tirumurai, Sekkizhar, the Periya Puranam and the works of Subramania Bharati. He published numerous articles and books in Tamil and English and also wrote introductions and forewords to other works.

=== Saiva Siddhanta and Tirumurai ===
T. N. Ramachandran translated several of the fourteen Meykandar Saiva Siddhanta Sastras into English, including Nenju Vidu Thoothu, Sivaprakasam, Tiruvundiyar, Tirukkalitruppatiyar and Kodikkavi. His translations also included the sixth Tirumurai of Tirunavukkarasar, the first and second Tirumurais of Tirugnana Sambandar, the seventh Tirumurai of Sundarar, and works of Karaikkal Ammaiyar and Pattinathar.

He translated Manikkavacakar's Tirukkovaiyar into English; Tamil University published the translation in 1989. His English rendering of Tiruvachakam was published by the International Institute of Tamil Studies.

=== Periya Puranam ===
T. N. Ramachandran produced an English translation of Sekkizhar's Periya Puranam, published by Tamil University, Thanjavur, in two volumes in 1990. Mylapore Times described him as the first person to translate nearly 4,300 stanzas of the work into English. He also conducted classes on the Periya Puranam and Saiva Siddhanta.

His long association with the study of Sekkizhar led to his being widely known by the epithet Sekkizhaar-Adi-p-Podi.

=== Bharati studies ===
T. N. Ramachandran translated a number of Bharati's works into English, including Vinayakar Naan Mani Malai, Kuyil Paattu, Kannan Paattu and Panchali Sapatham. For Tamil University he edited Bharati Patalkal: English Translation, which brought together English translations of Bharati's poems.

In a 2014 interview with Hindu Tamil Thisai, T. N. Ramachandran discussed the linguistic challenges of translating Bharati's poetry and was identified as the recipient that year of the Bharati Award presented by the Vanavil Cultural Centre. His Tamil study Vazhi Vazhi Bharati was published in 2000.

== Positions and recognition ==
T. N. Ramachandran was honorary director of the International Institute of Saiva Siddhanta Research at Dharmapuram Adheenam, founded the Saint Sekkizhar School of Saiva Siddhanta, and served on a committee concerned with revision of the University of Madras Tamil Lexicon.

The Government of Tamil Nadu honoured him during the Bharati centenary celebrations in 1982 for his translations of Bharati and presented him with a Best Translator award in 1983. In 2001, the University of Jaffna conferred an honorary Doctor of Letters degree on him.

Sahitya Akademi published his monographs Saint Sekkizhaar in 1994 and Sivagnaana Munivar in 1999 as part of its Makers of Indian Literature series.

== Legacy ==
Following T. N. Ramachandran's death on 6 April 2021, Tamil newspapers and literary publications carried appreciations of his work as a translator and scholar.

In December 2021, SASTRA Deemed University established the Sekkizhar-Adi-p-Podi Dr. T. N. Ramachandran Memorial Endowment. The university states that T. N. Ramachandran's family contributed ₹500,000 to create the endowment and that it had acquired his personal library, comprising more than 35,000 books, earlier that year. The endowment supports an annual memorial lecture and an award for an outgoing student. Memorial lecturers have included Y. Manikandan in 2023, historian Chithra Madhavan in 2024 and Sudha Seshayyan in 2025.

== Selected publications ==
- Bharati Patalkal: English Translation. Editor. Tamil University, 1989.
- Tirukkovaiyar. English translation. Tamil University, 1989.
- St. Sekkizhar's Periya Puranam. English translation, 2 vols. Tamil University, 1990.
- Saint Sekkizhaar. Sahitya Akademi, 1994.
- Sivagnaana Munivar. Sahitya Akademi, 1999.
- Vazhi Vazhi Bharati. 2000.
- Hymns of Kaaraikkaal Ammaiyaar. English translation.
- St. Umapati's Six Saiva Siddhanta Sastras. English translation.
- Divine Plays of Lord Siva: Tiruvilaiyadal Puranam Pictorial. English translation; Sri Ramakrishna Math edition, 2022.
