= Sheik Mahaboob Subhani =

Indian musician (1954/1955–2026)

- Born: 1954 or 1955; Prakasam district, Andhra Pradesh, India
- Died: 4 March 2026 (aged 71) Srirangam, Tamil Nadu, India
- Genre: Carnatic music
- Occupation: Musician
- Instrument: Nadaswaram
- Spouse: Kaleeshabi Mahaboob Subhani

Sheik Mahaboob Subhani (1954 or 1955 – 4 March 2026) was an Indian classical nadaswaram artist. He performed with his wife Kaleeshabi Mahaboob, also a nadaswaram artist.

== Early life ==
Subhani was born in Prakasam district in Andhra Pradesh. His father Kothapalli Sheikh Meera Sahib, and his maternal grandfather, Nadhabrahma Nadaswara Ganakala Prapoorna Janab Sheikh Chinna Peer Sahib, were also nadhaswaram artists.

He received training at Sarada Sangeetha Kalasala, Kurnool and later under legendary instrumentalist, Sheikh Chinna Moulana Sahib.

== Career ==
Subhani started his performing when he was seven, but due to family circumstances he had to work as a clerk in a tobacco company.

He rendered popular carnatic ragas and kritis on the nadaswaram. Subhani and his wife, Kaleeshabi Mahaboob, were appointed Asthana vidwans of Sringeri Sharada peetham in 2001.

Subhani and Mahaboob were awarded the Padma Shri award by honourable president of India, Shri Ramnath Kovind in 2020.

== Death ==
Subhani died on 4 March 2026, at the age of 71.
