= Ongole Urban mandal =

- Mandal
- Interactive map of Ongole Urban mandal
- Location in Andhra Pradesh, India
- Coordinates: 15°31′N 80°05′E
- Country: India
- State: Andhra Pradesh
- District: Prakasam
- Headquarters: Ongole

Languages
  - Official: Telugu
- Time zone: UTC+5:30 (IST)

Ongole Urban mandal is a mandal Prakasam district of the state of Andhra Pradesh, India. It is administered under Ongole revenue division and its headquarters are located at Ongole. It is formed on 8 May 2023 by division of Ongole mandal.

== Villages ==
1. Annavarappadu
2. Cheruvukommupalem
3. Gudemellapadu
4. Koppolu
5. Malleswarapuram
6. Mamidipalem
7. Mukthinuthalapadu
8. Narasapuram
9. Ongole
10. Pelluru
11. Throvagunta
12. Vengamukkalapalem
