= History of Karur =

Karur was built on the banks of River Amaravathi which was called Aanporunai during the Sangam days. The names of the early Chera kings who ruled from Karur, have been found in the rock inscriptions in Aru Nattar Malai close to Karur. The Tamil epic Silapathikaram mentions that the famous Chera King Senguttuvan ruled from Karur. The ancient Greek scholar Ptolemy is said to have known Karur by the name Korevera or Kāroura, placing it as a major trading centre in the region

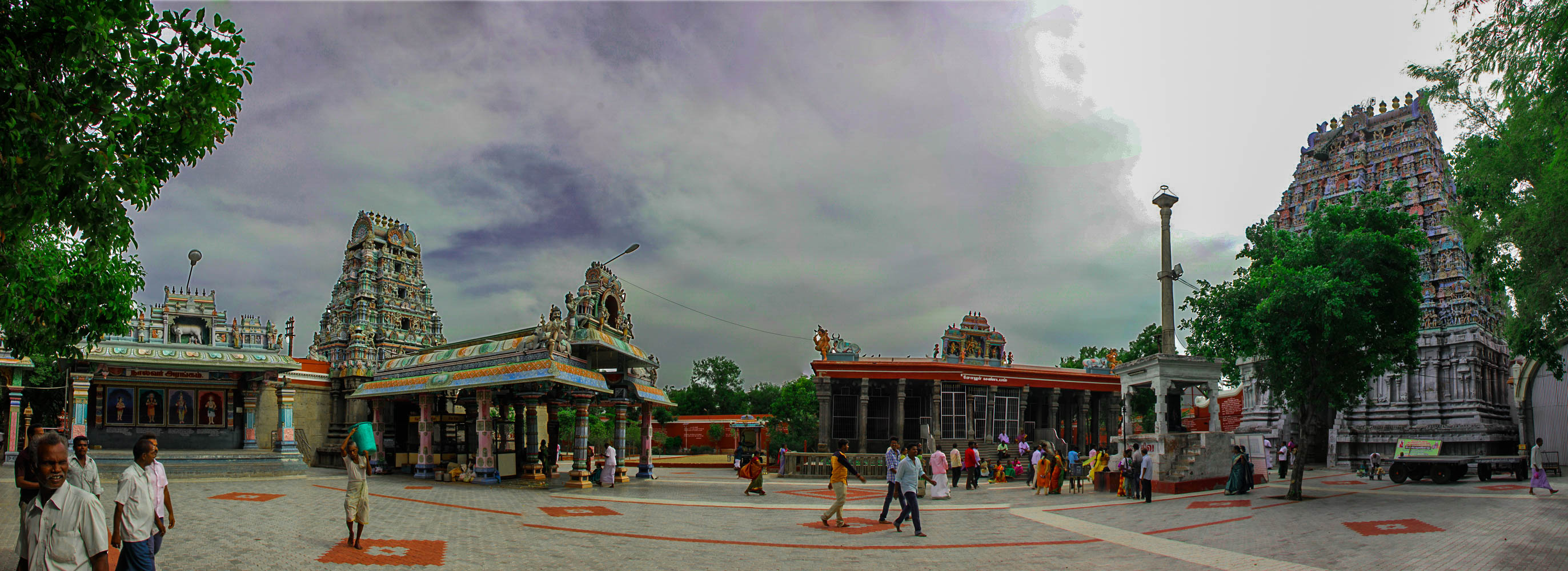
shiva temple at karur

== Rulers of Karur ==
Karur may have been the center for old jewellery-making and gem setting (with the gold imported mainly from Rome), as seen from various excavations. According to the Hindu mythology, Brahma began the work of creation here, which is referred to as the "place of the sacred cow."

The Pasupatheesvarar Temple sung by Thirugnana Sambandar, in Karur was built by the Chola kings in the 7th century. Karur is one of the oldest towns in Tamil Nadu and has played a very significant role in the history and culture of the Tamils. Its history dates back over 2000 years, and has been a flourishing trading center even in the early Sangam days. It was ruled by the Cheras, Gangas, Cholas, the Vijaynagara Nayaks, Mysore and the British successively. Epigraphical, numismatic, archaeological and literary evidence have proved beyond doubt that Karur was the capital of early Chera kings of Sangam age. And Kongunadu is only the Chera Kingdom that extended up to the western coast till Muziri in Kerala, South India when the empire was at its peak and which the Cheras made it as their main port city. The Chera Kings and Kongudesa Rajakkal were one and the same. In olden days it was called Karuvoor or Vanchi or Vanji during Sangam days. There has been a plethora of rare findings during the archaeological excavations undertaken in Karur. These include mat-designed pottery, bricks, mud-toys, Roman coins, Chera Coins, Pallava Coins, Roman Amphorae, Rasset coated ware, rare rings, etc.

Karuvoor born in Karur, is one among the nine devotees who sung the divine Music Thiruvichaippa, which is the ninth Thirumurai. He is the single largest composer among the nine authors of Thiruvichaippa. He lived during the reign of the great Rajaraja Chola-I. The same Temple is presumably mentioned in epic Silappadikaram as Adaha maadam Ranganathar whose blessings Cheran Senguttuvan sought before his north Indian expedition.

Later the Nayakars followed by Tipu Sultan also ruled Karur.

Karur is also a part of Kongu Nadu. The history of Kongu nadu dates back to the 8th century. The name Kongunadu originated from the term "Kongu", meaning nectar or honey. Kongu came to be called as Kongu nadu with the growth of civilization. The ancient Kongunadu country was made up of various districts and taluks which are currently known as Palani, Dharapuram, Karur, Namakkal, Thiruchengodu, Erode, Salem, Dharmapuri, Satyamangalam, Nilgiris, Avinashi, Coimbatore, Pollachi and Udumalpet.

== Chera Rule ==
Karur was ruled by different Chera kings. Cheras (capital:Karur (Vanji), ruling nearly the whole of old Kongu - lineage unclear- Cheran kootam)

Ruler Name	Reign
Vanavaramban	[430-350 BC]
Kuttuvan Uthiyan Cheralathan	[350-328 BC]
Imayavaramban Neduncheralathan	[328-270 BC]
Palyaanai Chelkezhu Kuttuvan	[270-245 BC]
Kalangaikanni Narmudicheral	[245-220 BC]
Perumcheralathan	[220-200 BC]
Kudakko Neduncheralathan	[200-180 BC]
Kadal Pirakottiya Velkezhu Kuttuvan	[180-125 BC]
Adukotpattuch Cheralathan	[125-87 BC]
Selvak Kadungo Vazhiyathan	[87-62 BC]

As found in Allahabad inscriptions of Samudragupta.

== British rule ==
The British added Karur to their possessions after destroying the Karur Fort during their war against Tipu Sultan in 1783. There is a memorial at Rayanur near Karur for the warriors who lost their lives in the fight against the British in the Anglo-Mysore Wars. Thereafter Karur became part of British India and was first part of Coimbatore District and later Tiruchirappalli District.
