= Stone nadaswaram =

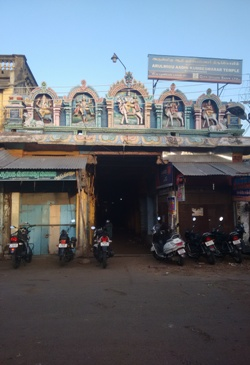
The facade of Kumbeswarar Temple

A stone nadaswaram is a nadaswaram made of stone.

== Form of ordinary nadaswaram ==
The tradition of music of Tamils has existed many years. From morning till night throughout the life of Tamils, this instrument holds a place. It is a wind instrument similar to the North Indian shehnai. It is preserved as a treasure in the temple. While playing the musical sound which comes out from it would attract one and all and it would give an extreme satisfaction to the mind and heart. According to season, Tamils made instruments and played and worshipped the deities. Traditionally the body of the instrument is made out of a tree called aacha (Tamil ஆச்சா). The body part of the instrument is made of one type of grass which is found on the banks of the Kaveri River.

== Kumbeswarar Temple ==
This stone nadaswaram is located in the Kumbeswarar Temple in Kumbakonam, Tamil Nadu, India. This is considered as one of the cultural treasure of this temple. It has been located in this temple for many hundreds of years.

== Tradition ==
The stone nadaswaram is six times heavier when compared to ordinary nadaswaram. With 3 kg. weight it is of 2 feet length. The ulavu part of this stone instrument contains three parts and joined into one. In the ordinary nadaswara seven ragas can be played. But in stone nadaswaram only six ragas are found. Only ragas such as Shanmukhapriya and Kalyani. Ragas such as Shankarabharanam, Kharaharapriya and Thodi cannot be played in stone nadaswara. Only experts may play the stone nadaswara.

== Playing stone nadaswaram ==
This stone nadaswaram was played in this temple during the Mahamaham and Masi festival. 15 years ago musician N. Saminathan played this instrument. Later on 29 September 2017, on the day of Ayudha Pooja, at the request of devotees, for one hour he played rāgas such as Panturothi, Shanmukhapriya, Dharmavati and Hemavati. N. Saminathan has been playing nadaswaram for 46 years. He studied in the Devasthana Music School at Sikkal in Nagapattinam district of Tamil Nadu. His guru was Kalaimamani Kottur N.Rajarathinam Pillai. As the Vidwan of the temple he has been playing the instrument for the past 27 years. 60 years back Pakkirisamy Pillai and for 30 years Kunjithapatham Pillai, the temple musicians of the temple played this instrument.

== Another stone nadaswaram ==
Another stone nadaswaram is found at Alwarthirunagari Temple in Tuticorin district of Tamil Nadu. In this temple it is just exhibited. This instrument was donated by King Krishnappa Nayak to the temple 350 years back.
