= Kalamegam =

1940 film by Ellis R. Dungan

- Theatrical release poster
- Directed by: Ellis R. Dungan; William J. Moylan
- Written by: Puduvai Bharathidasan
- Starring: T. N. Rajarathnam; S. P. L. Dhanalakshmi; N. S. Krishnan; T. A. Madhuram; Kali N. Rathnam
- Cinematography: V. Namasivayam
- Edited by: R. S. Mani
- Music by: R. N. Chinnaiah
- Production companies: Sri Dhandapani Films; Salem Mohini Pictures
- Release date: 17 May 1940
- Country: India
- Language: Tamil

Kalamegam is a 1940 Tamil-language film directed by Ellis R. Dungan and starring nadaswaram player T. N. Rajarathnam Pillai. This was the second film as script writer for the Tamil rationalist poet Bharathidasan. This was the only film in which Pillai acted in a lead role.

== Plot ==
Kalamegam is based on the life of 15th century Tamil poet Kaalamegam.

== Cast ==
Male cast

- "All India Nadaswara Vidwan" T. N. Rajarathnam as Varadan, Kalamegam
- N. S. Krishnan as Kittu
- C. V. V. Panthulu as Adimadura Kavi
- Kali N. Rathnam as Poet Kanda
- M. V. Mani as Poet Muthu
- M. S. Muthukrishnan as Singaram
- S. Murugesan as King Thirumalai Rayan
- Master T. V. Namasivayam as Prince
- Joker Ramudu as Kamalakannan
- Kunjithapadam Pillai as Poet Kunjitha
- K. R. Venugopala Sarma as Old Nattuvanar
- K. S. Muthaiah Bhagavathar as Devi Devotee
- Ramamirtha Chozhaganar as Village Chief

Female cast

- S. P. L. Dhanalakshmi as Mohangi
- T. A. Madhuram as Anjugam
- P. R. Mangalam as Poet Kanda’s Wife
- P. S. Gnanam as Veeri
- T. N. Rajalakshmi as Devi
- T. M. Pattammal as Female Dancer
- N. K. Periya Papu as Rathnam
- K. Subbulakshmi as Amudham
- G. S. Saraswathi as Kalyani
- M. R. Saraswathi as Pachai
- S. R. Meenatchi as Dasi
- K. T. Dhanalakshmi as Dasi
- Baby Chittamani Rajalakshmi as Veeri’s Foster Girl
- Manonmani Ammal as Mohana’s Mother

Support cast

R. S. Ramu, Natarajan, M. A. Pichai Pandurar, T. Thangaiah, A. Sivakozhundhu, C. G. Nammazhvar Reddiar, Ramasami Pillai, and Sundarabhashyam Naidu.

== Production ==
Dungan was hired to direct a film based on the life of the 15th century Tamil poet Kalamega Pulavar. Nadaswaram Maestro T. N. Rajarathnam Pillai was cast in the title role as poet Kalamegam. The script was written by the rationalist poet Puduvai Bharathidasan. To satisfy Rajarathnam Pillai's fans, scenes with Kalamegam playing the Nadaswaram were added to the film. Dharmapuri S. Murugesan who was one sixth partner of Mohini Pictures acted as the Raja Thirumalia Naiker in front of whom TNR played the nadhaswaram. C.V.V Panthulu and another minister were sitting in the dharbar. S. P. L. Dhanalakshmi was cast as Mohangi and the comedy parts were played by N. S. Krishnan, T. A. Madhuram and Kali N. Rathnam. According to the Kalamegam legend, he cursed a village to be destroyed in a sandstorm. Dungan filmed some of the sandstorm scenes on location and shot the remaining scenes using large sized miniatures constructed on the Elliot's Beach in Madras. The completed film was 18,986 feet in length. The film was produced at Prag Jyothi Motion Pictures.

== Songs ==
The music was composed by R. N. Chinnaiah and the lyrics were written by Puduvai Bharathidasan.

Orchestra

- R. N. Chinnaiah – Harmonium
- M. V. Santhanamaiah – Harmonium
- V. Govindasami – Fiddle
- R. N. Thambi – Veena
- K. V. Naidu – Mridangam
- C. Kuppusami Naidu – Clarinet
- Sadhu Ganapathi Sastri – Jalatharangam
- Bande Khan Saheb – Sarangi
- J. Ramakrishna Rao – Organ
- Nagaiah – Flute
- T. S. Mani – Bulbulthara
- N. Parthasarathy Naidu – Saxophone

== Reception ==
The film was released on 17 May 1940 and was a box office failure. But the sandstorm scenes were well received by the audience. The film is lost, with the only known surviving artefacts being stills and 78 rpm-song discs.
