= Karukurichi Arunachalam =

Karukurichi P. Arunachalam
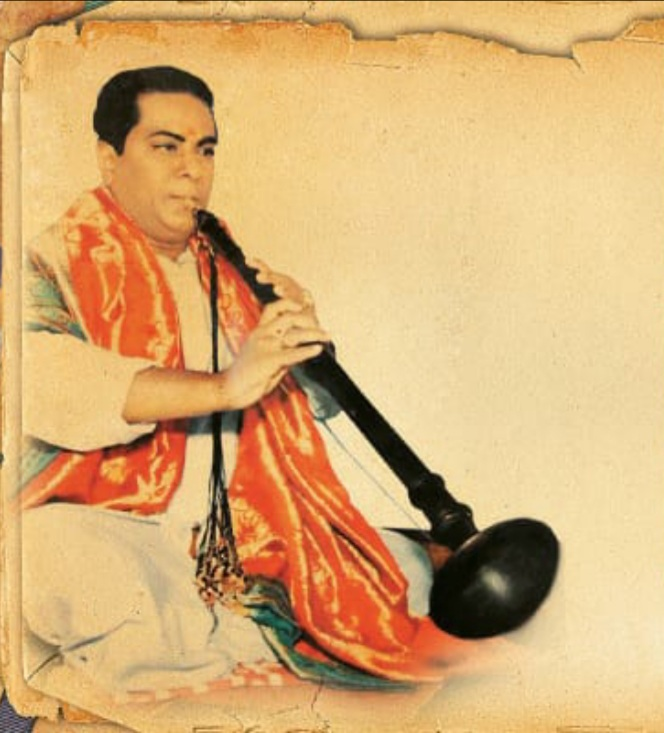

Background information
- Also known as: Karukurichiyar
- Born: Arunachalam; 26 April 1921; Karukurichi
- Died: 6 April 1964 (aged 43) Palayamkottai
- Genres: Carnatic music
- Occupation: Nadaswaram performer
- Instrument: Nadaswaram
- Years active: 15
- Relatives E.V.Saroja, T. R. Ramanna, M.K.Radha, Rajaji, T. D. Kusalakumari

Palavesam Arunachalam (26 April 1921 – 6 April 1964) was a popular nadaswaram player. He was popularly known as Karukurichi Arunachalam after Karukurichi, his native village in the Tirunelveli District of Tamil Nadu.

== Life ==
Arunachalam was born in 1921 to Palavesam and Chellammal. Arunachalam's father, who was allegedly impressed by the fame and prestige enjoyed by musicians, especially nadaswaram players, wanted to become a nadaswaram player himself. Another account says he was inspired by the virtuosity of the nadaswaram player Koorainadu Natesa Pillai. Though Arunachalam's father trained for several years, he was not successful.

Arunachalam's father taught him to play the nadaswaram. Arunachalam trained further on the nadaswaram under Kattumalli Subbiah and Vilathikulam Swamigal, and under Kalakkad Subbiah Bhagavatar and Kalakkad Ramanarayana Bhagavatar for vocal music.

Arunachalam's break came when he not only had the opportunity to meet Pillai, but also accompanied him on stage when one of Pillai's deputies, Natarajasundaram Pillai, fell ill just before a concert. Impressed with Arunachalam's talent and love for the art, Pillai embraced Arunachalam as his full-time student (Gurukulavasam). Arunachalam honed his skills under the guru over the years and established a name for himself.

Arunachalam quickly became a much sought after artist. Arunachalam's fame soared when he played for the Tamil movie Konjum Salangai, in which the hero is a nadaswaram player. The song "Singaravelane Deva" was a hit and often played at local events. Though he did not continue acting, his career as a musician flourished. E.V.Saroja, T. R. Ramanna, M.K.Radha, Rajaji and T. D. Kusalakumari were very close relatives of him.

== Death and legacy ==
Arunachalam died suddenly at the age of 43 on 6 April 1964 at the peak of his fame. Even today, his recordings are often played at weddings and auspicious occasions in Tamil Nadu and among Tamil communities outside India.
