= Maniambalanathar Temple =

Maniambalanathar Temple is a Hindu temple situated in the village of Keezhkkottur in the Mannargudi taluk, Tiruvarur district of Tamil Nadu, India.

== Location ==
This Shiva temple is located at a distance of 15 km from Thiruthuraipoondi in north west. Kottur is divided into Melkkottur and Keezhkkottur. This temple is located at Keezhkkottur. Another Shiva temple found in Melkkottur, known as Kottur Kozhundeeswarar Temple is one of the Paadal Petra Sthalams.

== Presiding deity ==
The presiding deity is known as Maniambalanathar and the goddess is known as Maniambalanayaki.

== Those worshipped ==
It is believed that Brahma and Airavata worshipped the deity of the temple.
