= Ongole Rural mandal =

- Mandal
- Interactive map of Ongole Rural mandal
- Location in Andhra Pradesh, India
- Coordinates: 15°31′N 80°05′E
- Country: India
- State: Andhra Pradesh
- District: Prakasam
- Headquarters: Ongole

Languages
  - Official: Telugu
- Time zone: UTC+5:30 (IST)

Ongole Rural mandal is a mandal Prakasam district of the state of Andhra Pradesh, India. It is administered under Ongole revenue division and its headquarters are located at Ongole. It is formed on 8 May 2023 by division of Ongole mandal.

== Villages ==
1. Chejarla
2. Devarampadu
3. Karavadi
4. Manduvavaripalem H/o Throvagunta
5. Mangaladripuram
6. Saruereddypalem
7. Ulichi
8. Valetivaripalem H/o Throvagunta
9. Yerrajarla
