= Ottu (instrument) =

The ottu (or otter) is a double reed wind instrument, used in Carnatic music of Southern India to provide a drone accompaniment to the similar nadaswaram oboe.

Like the nadaswaram, the ottu is a large conical instrument, measuring approximately two and a half feet in length. This traditional Indian wind instrument shares similarities with the nadaswaram in terms of size and shape, contributing to its powerful and resonant sound. The ottu plays a crucial role in South Indian classical music, often accompanying the nadaswaram in temple rituals and ceremonial occasions. Its construction and design are meticulously crafted to produce a deep, continuous drone that complements the melodic lines played by the nadaswaram.

Unlike the nadaswaram, the ottu has no fingerholes and is designed to produce a single constant note while being played. This characteristic sets it apart from the nadaswaram, which has fingerholes to create a range of notes. The ottu is equipped with several small tuning holes that can be adjusted by stopping them with wax, allowing the player to modify its pitch slightly. This feature ensures that the ottu can be finely tuned to complement the nadaswaram, providing a consistent drone that supports the main melody. The tuning holes and the use of wax offer a simple yet effective method for achieving the desired pitch, making the ottu an essential instrument in South Indian classical music for maintaining harmonic balance.

In some cases, a shruti box may be used in place of the ottu due to its steadier sound. The shruti box, a small reed instrument, provides a consistent and reliable drone that can be more easily controlled than the ottu. This alternative is often chosen for its ability to maintain a uniform pitch without the need for constant adjustment, which can be challenging with the ottu. The steadiness of the shruti box makes it a preferred option in various musical settings, ensuring a continuous harmonic foundation that supports the main performance. Its ease of use and dependability make it a practical substitute, especially in situations where a stable drone is crucial for the overall musical arrangement. The player holds the instrument in their left hand, sustaining the sound by inhaling through their nose, and with the right hand, beats on a drum strapped onto a belt.
