= Veezhinathar Kovil, Thiruveezhimizhalai =

Hindu temple in Tamil Nadu, India

Veezhinathar Temple
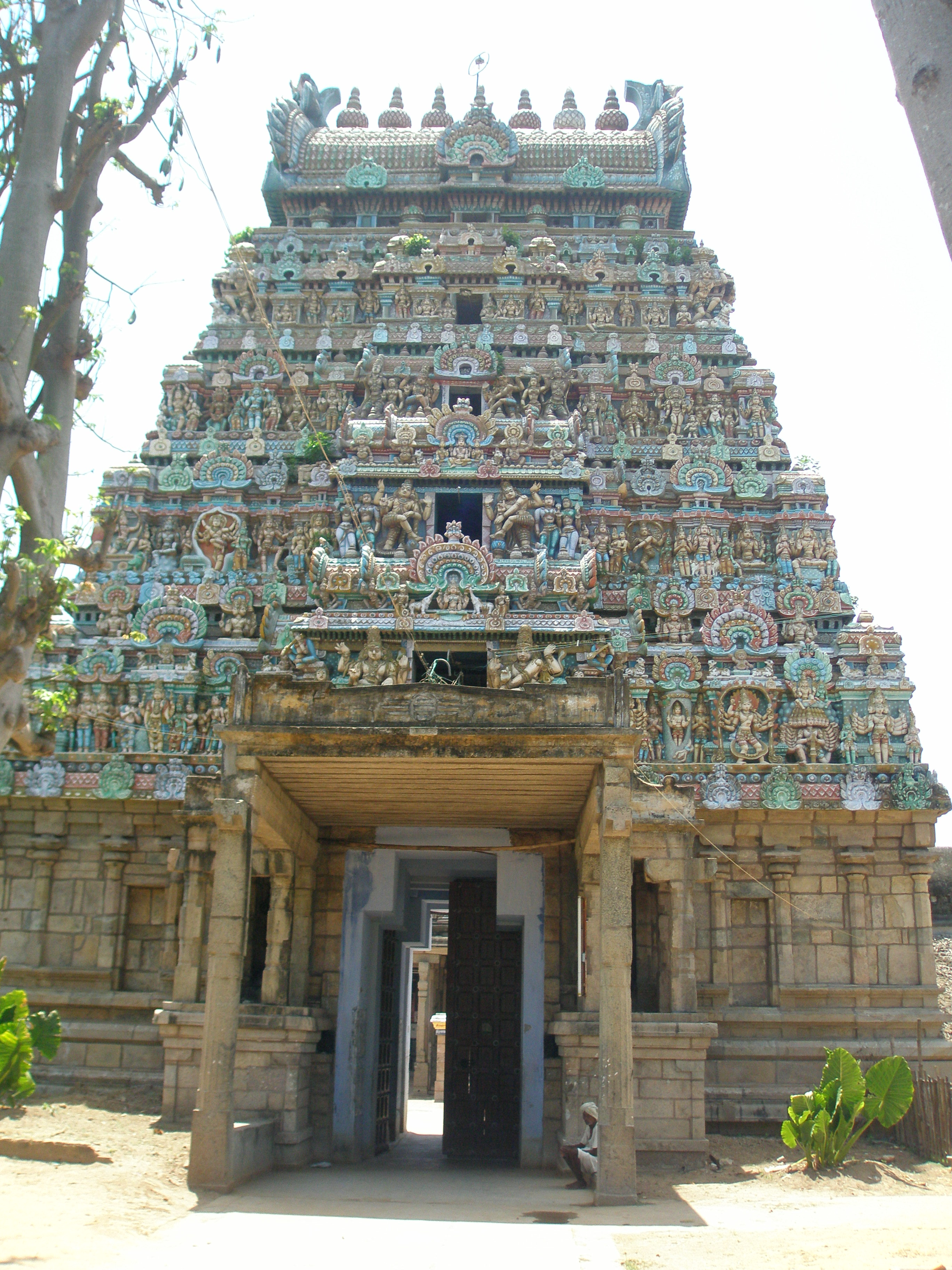

- Location in Tamil Nadu

Religion
- Affiliation: Hinduism
- District: Thiruvarur
- Deity: Veezhinathar (Shiva) Azhagiya Maamulai Amman (Parvati)

Location
- Location: Thiruveezhimizhalai, Kudavasal
- State: Tamil Nadu
- Country: India
- Coordinates: 10°56′48″N 79°34′24″E

Architecture
- Type: Dravidian architecture

Veezhinathar Temple (வீழிநாதர் கோயில், திருவீழிமிழலை ]) is an ancient temple located in Thiruveezhimizhalai dedicated to Lord Shiva. Thiruveezhimizhalai is a revenue village in Kudavasal Taluka of Thiruvarur District in Tamil Nadu, India. This temple is the 61st Padal Petra Kovil also known as Paadal Petra Sthalams in the Chola Naadu, South of Kaveri.

== Mythology ==
Parvati is said to have been reborn as Katyayani and married Shiva here. Vishnu received the cosmic weapon Chakrayudam from Shiva here in lieu of the 1000 flower worship to Shiva. A panel depicting the divine marriage is seen behind the Shivalingam. The Moolvar vimanam is believed to be brought to here by Mahavishnu.

== History ==
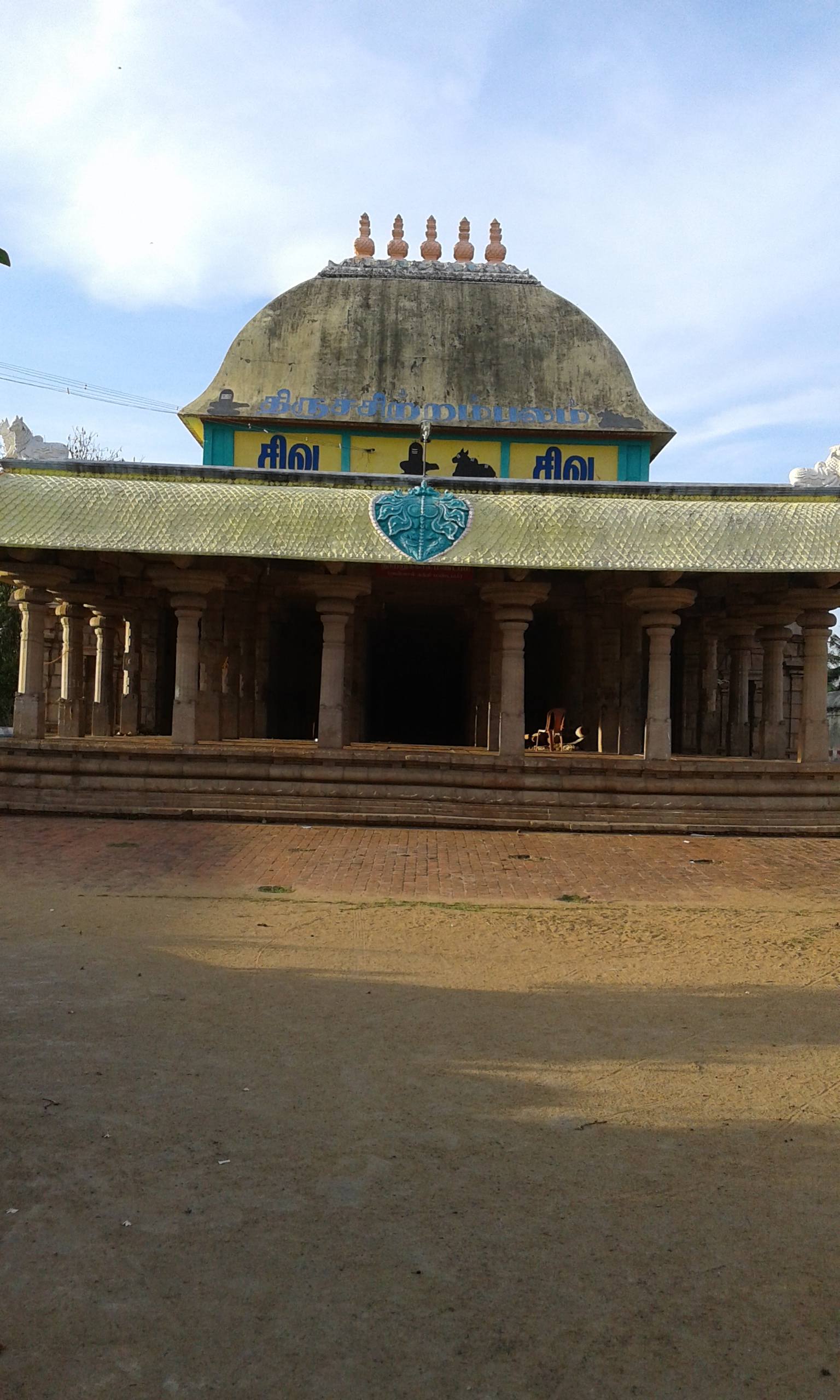
Image of the hall of the temple where bats cannot reside

The name Thiruveezhimizhalai is said to have come from two legends that took place here. The place was once a forest full of Sandhanam (Sandalwood), Senbagai, Pala (Jackfruit), Vila which is called Veezhi in Tamil. Also there is a plant by name Veezhi which grows in abundance at this place. Hence it is called Veezhi Kaadu(forest). Secondly there was a saint by name Mizhalai Kurumbar (22nd of 63 nayanmars)who lived here. He used to offer Vila fruit to Lord Shiva daily. Seeing his bhakthi, Lord Shiva gave dharsan to him. Lord Shiva + Veezhi Plants + Mizhalai Kurumbar = Thiruveezhimizhalai When Sambandar and Thirunavukarasar visit this place, there was a severe drought all around. They prayed to Lord Shiva who gave Padikasu (Gold Coin) one each every day to both of them. Sambandar gets Padikasu at the Pedam in front of Mahamandapam. Navukarasar gets gold coin in the Pedam in Merkku (west) prakaram(closed precincts of a temple). Using these gold coin, they offered food to the needy people. The Math where they did anandanam is located on Vadaku Therodum Veedhi (North car Street).

== How to reach ==
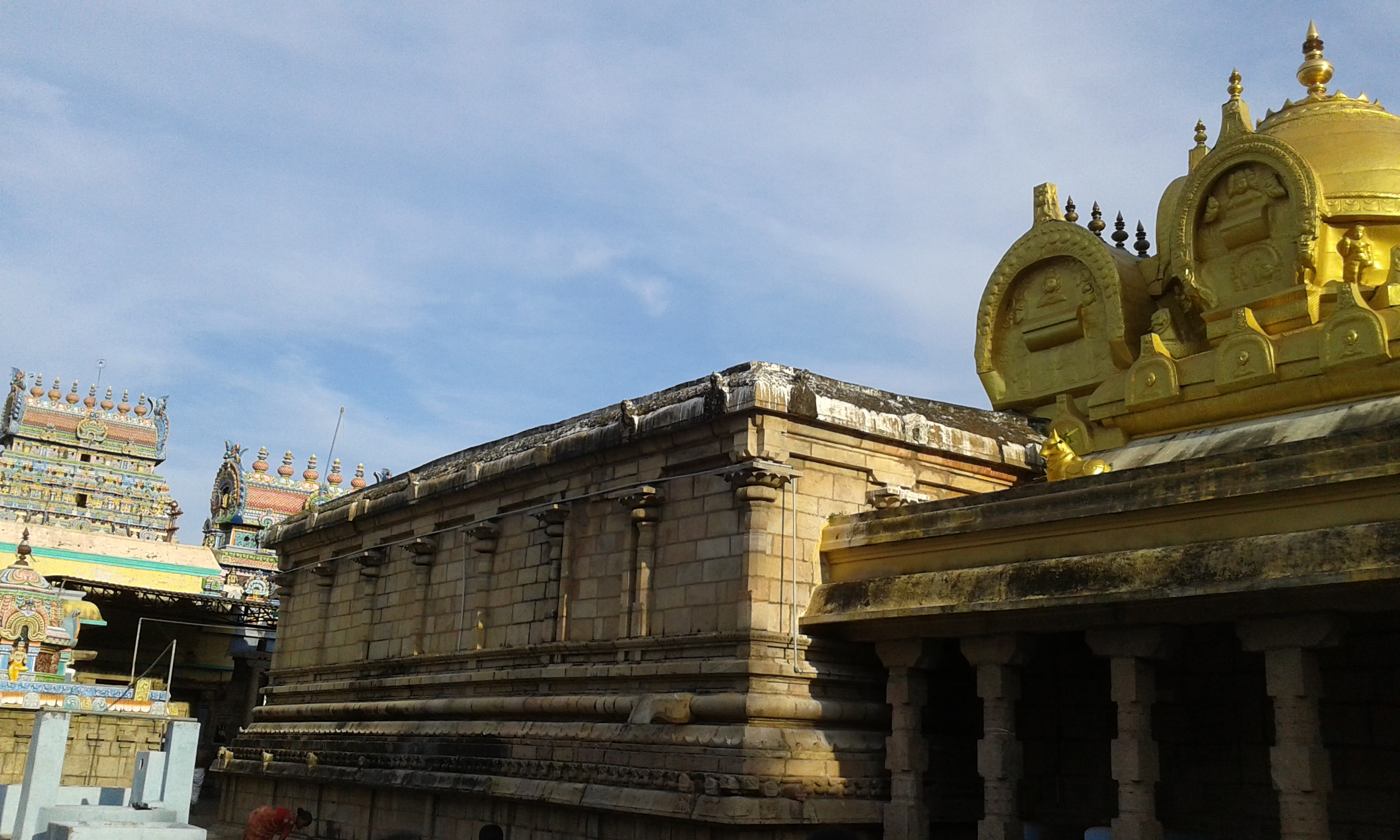
Image of the sanctum and entry tower

hose who come from Chennai or Puducherry can come up to Mayiladuthurai and take Mayiladuthurai-Thiruvarur Road up to Poonthottam. From Poonthottam, take Poonthotam-Natchiyar Koil Road to reach Thenkarai. From Kumbakonam, take Thiruvarur road till Natchiyar Koil and from there, take Poonthotam-Natchiyar Koil Road to reach Thenkarai. From Thenkarai, cross the Arasalarur in the north and walk 1 km. to reach Thiruveezhimizhalai temple. T

== Photogallery ==
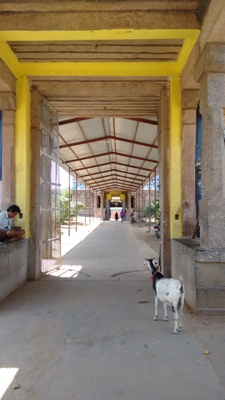
Main entrance

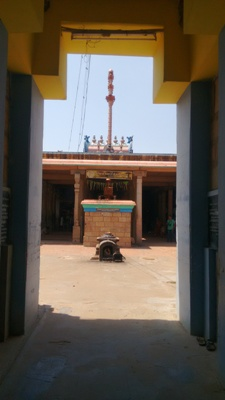
Flagpost

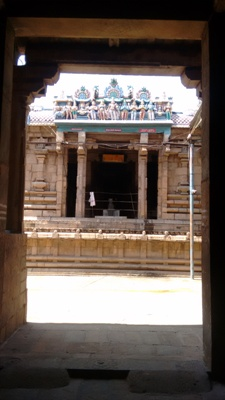
Facade of the mandapa

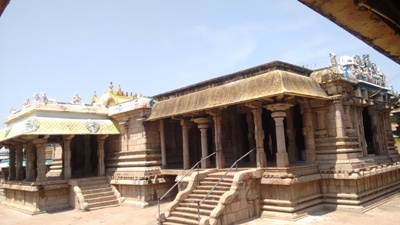
Front mandapa

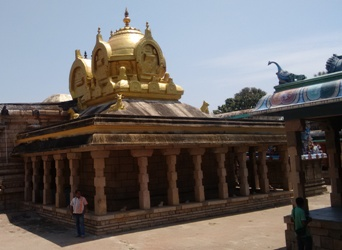
Vimana

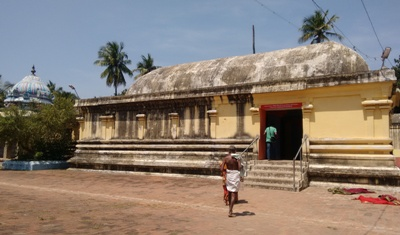
Shrine of the Goddess

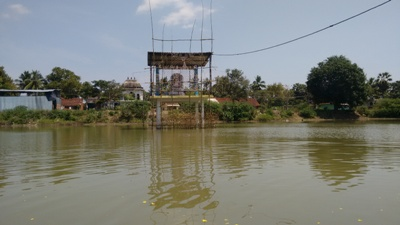
Temple tank
