= Seevali (reed) =

Vibrating piece in South Indian musical instrument

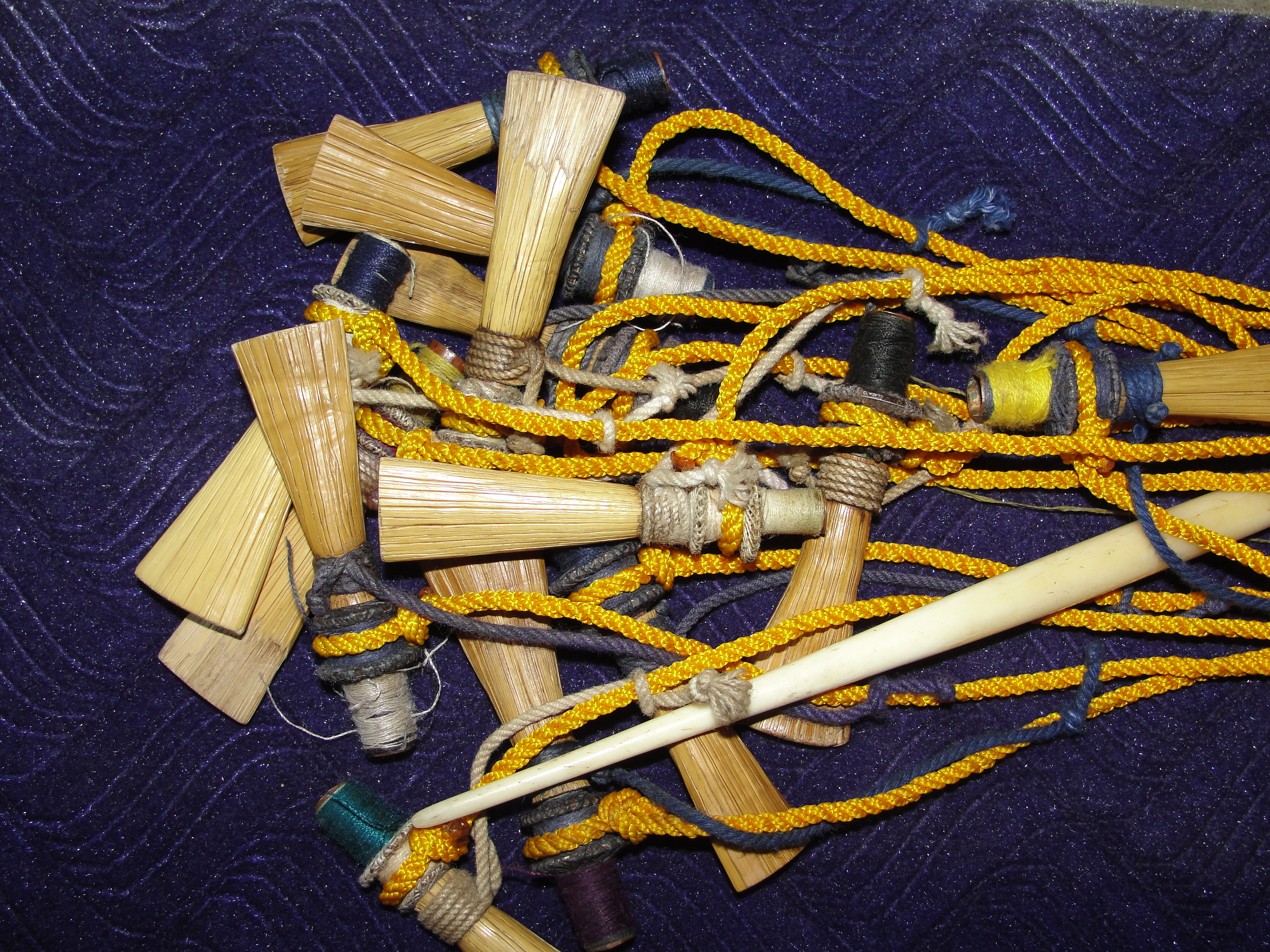
A collection of seevalis.

Seevali is the reed used when playing the nadaswaram, a double reed wind instrument from South India. The nadaswaram is used as a traditional classical instrument in Tamil Nadu, Andhra Pradesh, Telangana, Karnataka and Kerala and in the northern and eastern parts of Sri Lanka.

The reed is made by drying and shaping grass. The reeds are traditionally produced by an artisan family in the village of Thiruvaduthurai, Tamil Nadu.

== See also ==
- Thiruvaduthurai
- Music of Tamil Nadu
