= Azhagiyanathaswamy Temple, Kalappal =

Shiva temple in Tamil Nadu, India

Azhagiyanathaswamy Temple is a Hindu temple dedicated to the deity Shiva, located at Kalappal in Tiruvarur district, Tamil Nadu, India. The presiding deity is represented by the lingam known as Azhagiyanathaswamy and Aditesvarar. His consort, the goddess, is known as Prabanayaki and Pannermozhiyal.

The temple is mentioned as one of the Vaippu Sthalams sung by Tamil Saivite Nayanar Sundarar, a devotional poet of the eighth century. It is also mentioned by Karuvur Thevar in Thiruvisaippa.
