= Karavadi =

- Village
- Interactive map of Karavadi
- Location in Andhra Pradesh, India
- Coordinates: 15.5490°N 80.1136°E
- Country: India
- State: Andhra Pradesh
- District: Prakasam
- Mandal: Ongole

Area
  - Total: 26.43 km^{2} (10.20 sq mi)

Population (2011)
  - Total: 6,327
  - Density: 239.4/km^{2} (620.0/sq mi)

Languages
  - Official: Telugu
- Time zone: UTC+5:30 (IST)

Karavadi is a village in Prakasam district of the Indian state of Andhra Pradesh. It is situated in Ongole mandal of Ongole revenue division.

== Notable people ==
- Kasim-Babu Brothers
