= Umapathy Kandasamy =

Sikkal Umapathy Kandasamy (21 February 1950 – 4 April 2017) was an Indian Carnatic musician, Nadaswaram maestro, vocalist. He was popularly known as "Nadaswara vidwan". Tamil Nadu government awarded "Rajarathina" in 2008 by Chief Minister of Tamil Nadu M.Karunanidhi (29 January 2008).

== Personal life ==
Sikkal Umapathy was born in Chidambaram and brought up in Sikkal, Nagapattinam. His father and grandfather were both carnatic musicians, Nadaswaram. He married Lalitha and had three sons and one daughter.

== Career ==
Umapathy received his musical training from his grandfather and had his advanced training from Kalaimamani Kizhvelur N.G. Ganesan. He started giving his nadaswaram concerts from his age 12. He was served for many famous temples in and around nagapattinam including Sikkal singaravelan temple. He was popularly called as "Sikkal umapathy". His unique style of nadaswaram attracted everyone and became more popular in Tamilnadau. His popularity reaches outside countries and he also served for many temples in Malaysia, Thailand and Singapore.

He was made Nadaswaram player in the temple Karumari amman, Thiruverkadu. Sikkal Umapathy took a number of younger nadaswaram players as his accompanists. He was also worked in Tamil Nadu Music school, Erode for seven years
