= Masilamaniswara Temple, Thiruvaduthurai =

Shiva temple in Tamil Nadu, India

Masilamaniswara Temple
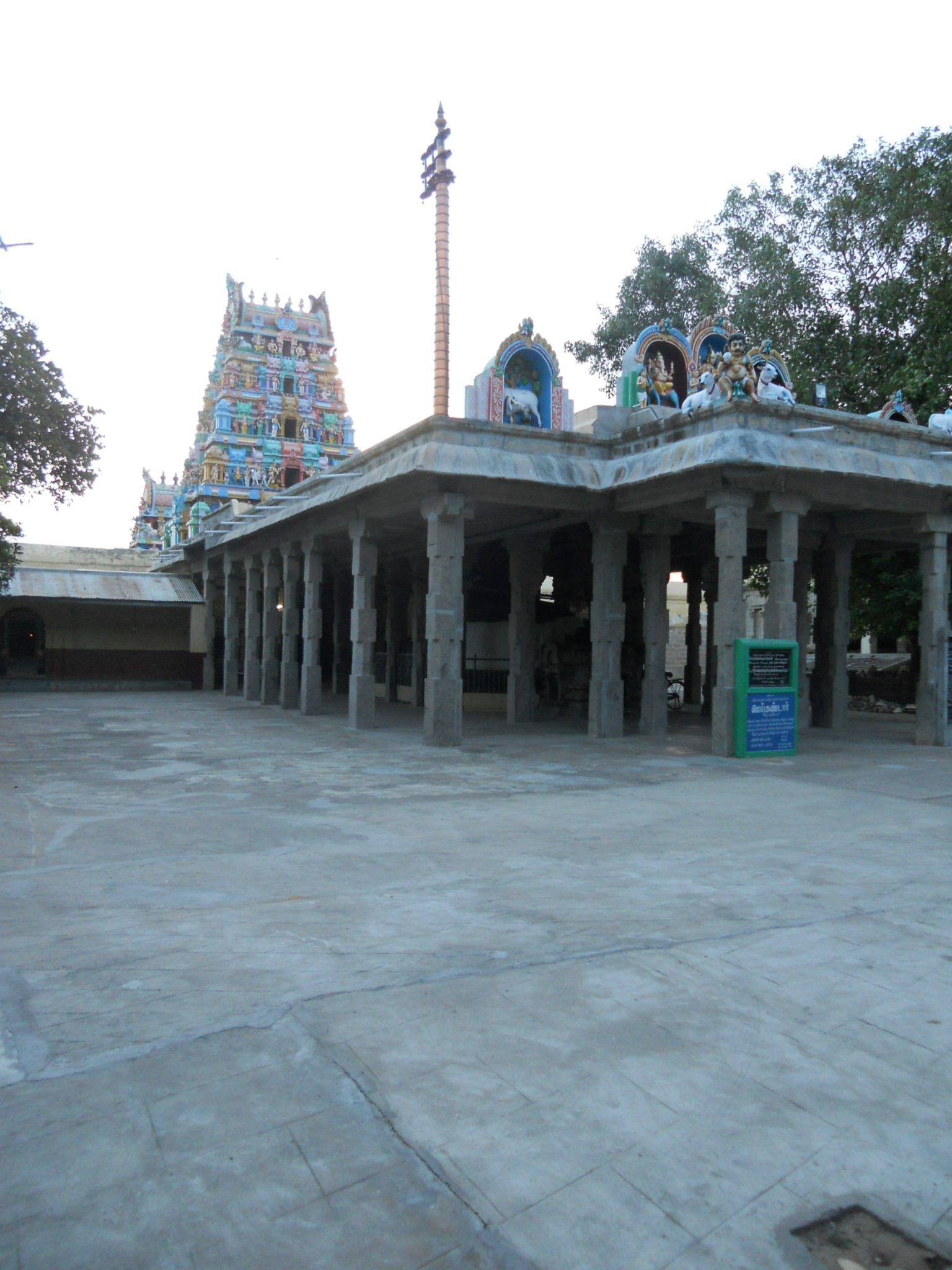

- Location in Tamil Nadu

Religion
- Affiliation: Hinduism
- District: Mayiladuthurai
- Deity: Masilamaniswarar (Shiva) Oppilamulaiyar/ Athulyakujambigai (Parvathi)
- Features: Temple tank: Gomukthi, Padma, Kaivalya; Temple tree: Padar Arasa Maram

Location
- Location: Thiruvaduthurai
- State: Tamil Nadu
- Country: India
- Coordinates: 11.038604°N 79.521632°E

Architecture
- Type: Dravidian architecture
- Temple: 1
- Inscriptions: 5 of Parantaka I

Masilamaniswara Temple, also known as Thiruvaduturai Udaiyar or Paramasvamin, is a Hindu temple dedicated to Hindu god Shiva, located in the village of Thiruvaduthurai in Mayiladuthurai district, Tamil Nadu. It is 17 km (11 mi) from district headquarters, Mayiladuthurai, and 22 km (14 mi) from Kumbakonam. It is one of the shrines of the 275 Paadal Petra Sthalams. The temple is referred to in the verses of Tevaram, the 7th century Tamil Saiva canon by Tirugnana Sambandar, Appar and Sundarar. The temple is associated with the legend of Saivite saint Tirumular (6th century CE).

The temple is believed to have been built by Cholas during 9th century A.D and with significant additions from later Chola kings and by the subsequent ruling empires. It houses five-tiered gateway towers known as gopurams. The temple is maintained and administered by the Thiruvaduthurai Adheenam, whose headquarters is located inside the temple.

== Legend ==
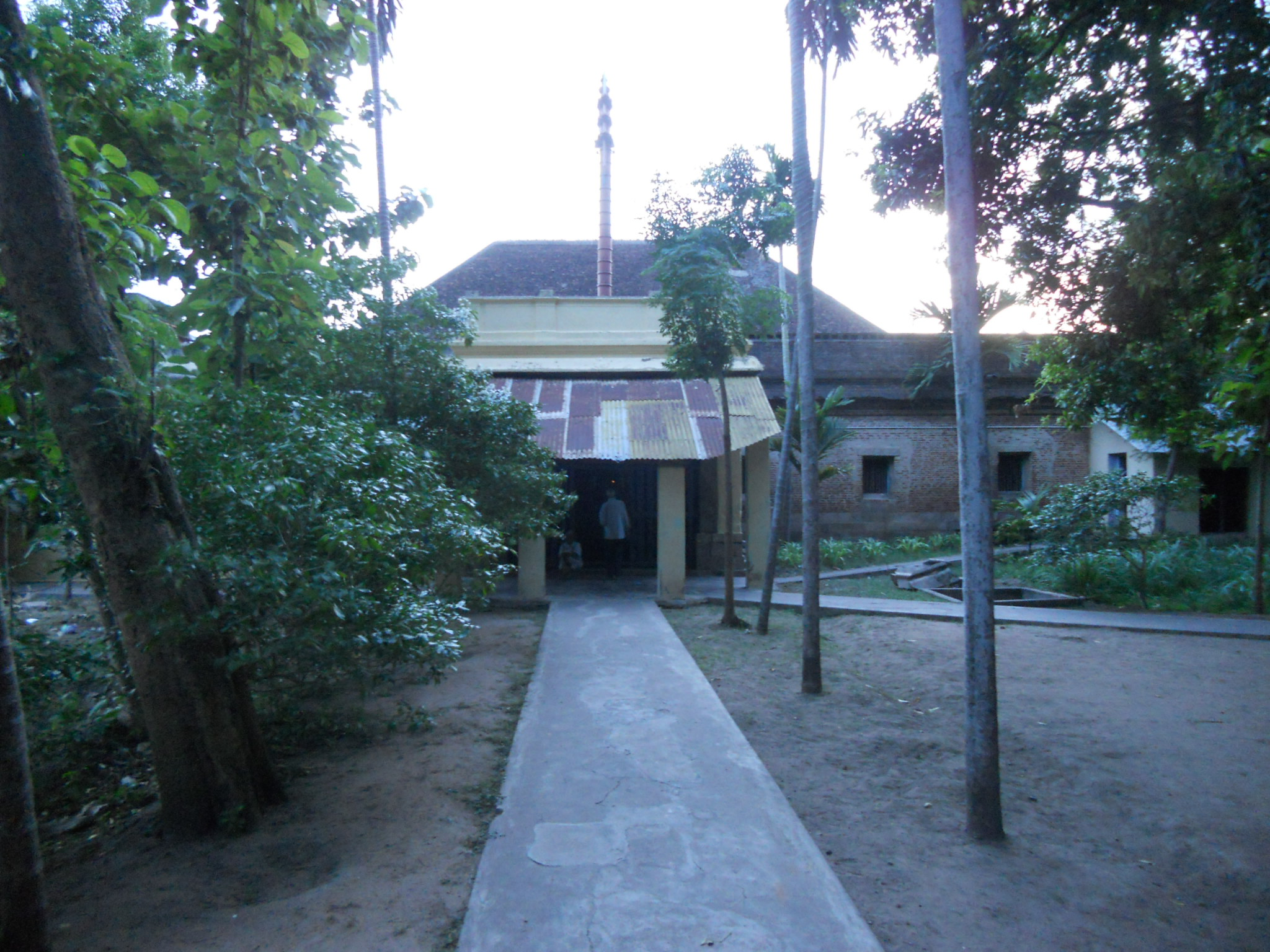
Shrine of Thirvaduthurai Adheenam

Legend associates the temple with the saivite saint Tirumular (6th century CE). Tirumular saw a herd of cows lamenting the death of their herdsmen named Moolan. Being a siddha, he entered into the body of Moolan, came back alive to serve as the herdsman. It is believed that he was coming from North to South India to meet sage Agastya. When he went back to the place where he left his original body, he did not find it. Considering it as a divine play, he continued to remain in the body of Moolan for the rest of his life. Tirumular, performed penance at the temple and composed the Tirumantiram, a Tamil Shaiva text, at this shrine.

As per another legend, Parvathi was cursed to become a cow and she worshipped Shiva to attain her original form. The legend is closely associated with this temple, but is also associated with other temples like Thenupuriswarar Temple at Patteswaram, Aavoor Pasupatheeswaram and Tirukogarnam near Pudukkottai.

== History ==
The Tevaram hymns indicate that the temple existed as a brick structure by the 7th century CE. Inscriptions indicate that the temple's stone construction had begun by Parantaka I 25th regnal year.

The temple is counted as one of the earliest temples built during the regime of Parantaka I. An inscription in the temple indicates record of grants to pipers, land endowments, flower gardens, carriers of sacred water during his third regnal year. Another inscription from his 38th regnal year recorded as 143 of 1925 indicates gift of 500 kalanjus of gold for the construction of the kudapadai upwards. Historians believe that the temple was built by Tirukaralippichan and was completed during the regime of Parantaka. There are other inscriptions that indicate donation of gold and silver vessels to the temple. The inscriptions from Rajaraja I recorded as 104 and 107 of 1925 indicate similar gift of metal images to the temple. This is counted as the first mention of portrait installation indicated in an inscription, with the other ones being in Konerirajapuram and Thiruvisanallur temples. The temple has been maintained and administered by the Thiruvaduthurai Adheenam, whose headquarters is located inside the temple.

== Architecture ==
The temple is located 12 km away from Mayiladuthurai and 24 km away from Kumbakonam. The temple has a five tiered Rajagopuram with elevated stone walls separating the second, third and fourth precinct. The images of the presiding deity, Masilamaniswarar, in the form of Shiva lingam occupies the main sanctum facing east. The shrine of the consort of Masilamaniswarar, Oppilamulaiyar faces west. The third prakaram has a separate shrine for the saivite saint Tirumular. The temple has three water bodies located at various places inside the temple. The Thiruvaduthurai Adheenam is located in the premises outside the fourth precinct.

== Religious significance ==
The temple is revered in the verses of Tevaram, the 7th century Saivite canonical work by the three saint poets, namely, Appar, Sambandar and Sundarar. The temple is reverred by Sambandar in the third Tirumurai in one verse, Appar in five and Sundarar in two verses.

"இடரினும் தளரினும் எனதுறுநோய்
தொடரினும் உனகழல் தொழுதெழுவேன்
கடல்தனில் அமுதொடு கலந்தநஞ்சை
மிடறினில் அடக்கிய வேதியனே

இதுவோஎமை ஆளுமா றீவதொன்றெமக் கில்லையேல்
அதுவோவுன தின்னருள் ஆவடுதுறை அரனே."

translating to

"when I am undergoing sufferings.
when I am depressed in spirits.
when my big karmams follow me I shall wake up from sleep worshipping your feet.
Civaṉ who gave out the Vētams and who controlled the poison which was mixed with the nectar in the ocean of milk and made it stay in the neck!
Civaṉ in Āvaṭutuṟai!
if there is nothing to give to us.
is this way you admit us as your protege?
is your sweet grace like that?".

Sambandar is believed to obtained gold coins from the presiding deity for performing Yagna by his father. Sundarar was relieved off his curse after praying the presiding deity. Thirumoolar, a Sidhha saint, is believed to have sung 3,000 in praise of the presiding deity in the temple. Thirumaligai Devar, another Siddha, is believed to have performed many wonders in the temple. The Samathi of both the Siddhas are in the precinct of the temple. The temple is counted as one of the temples built on the banks of River Kaveri.

Saiva Sithantham philosophy is promulgated in the temples owned by Atheenam. Tevaram is recited during all the six daily rituals.
