= T. N. Rajarathnam Pillai =

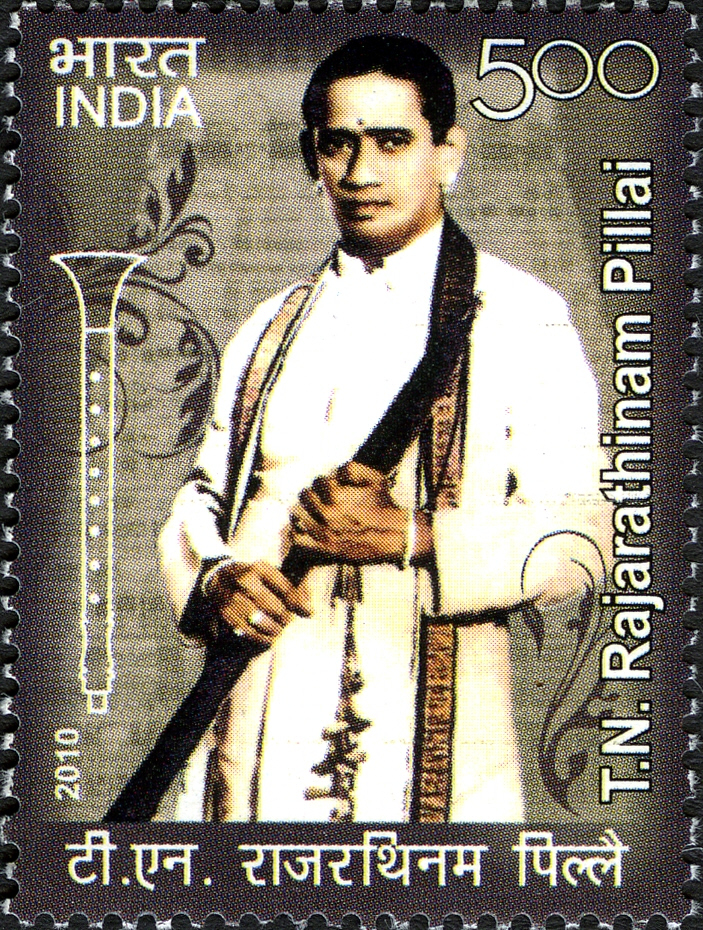
- Rajarathnam Pillai on a 2010 stamp of India.jpg

Background information
- Also known as: TNR
- Born: Balasubramaniam; 27 August 1898; Thiruvaduthurai, Tanjore District, Madras Presidency, British India (now Mayiladuthurai district, Tamil Nadu, India)
- Died: 12 December 1956 (aged 58) Madras, Madras State (now Chennai, Tamil Nadu), India
- Genre: Carnatic music
- Occupations: Nadaswaram Performer
- Instruments: Nadaswaram
- Years active: 32

Thirumarugal Natesapillai Rajarathinam Pillai (27 August 1898 – 12 December 1956) or TNR was an Indian Carnatic musician, nadaswaram maestro, vocalist and film actor. He was popularly known as "Nadaswara Chakravarthi" (literally, the Emperor of Nadaswaram).

== Film career ==
He featured in the main role as the 16th century Tamil poet Kalamegam in the 1940 film Kalamegam. He also appeared briefly as a Nadhaswaram player in the film Thiruneelakantar.

== Titles, honors and service ==
Rajarathnam Pillai was a recipient of many titles, none of them official or academic. He was popularly known as Nadaswara Chakravarthi meaning Emperor of Nagaswaram. He is believed to have promoted nadaswaram and tavil players for recognition as musicians in their own right and it is thought that his lead was recognised when the Madras Music Academy conferred the title of Sangeetha Kalanidhi (doctor of music) on fellow nagaswaram exponent Thiruvizhimizhalai Subramania Pillai in 1956. In spite of his fame and following, there is no formal or official account of his life readily available in Tamil or another language.
