= Chithra Madhavan =

Indian historian

- Born: Chennai
- Education: University of Madras; University of Mysore (PhD)
- Occupations: Historian, Writer
- Known for: Authoring books about Temple architectures and history

Chithra Madhavan is an Indian historian. Her area of study and expertise is Indian temple history, architecture, sculpture and iconography. She is the author of eight books on these subjects. She is a guest lecturer at many universities in India. She is the author of the "Temple Talk" column in the Indian express newspaper.

== Books ==
- History and Culture of Tamil Nadu: As Gleaned from the Sanskrit Inscriptions, published by D.K. Print World Ltd, 2005
- Sanskrit Education and Literature: in Ancient and Medieval Tamil Nadu, published by D.K. Print World Ltd, 2013
