= Thiruvaduthurai =

Coordinates: 11.0404°N 79.5182°E

Thiruvaduthurai Thiruavavaduthurai
- Village
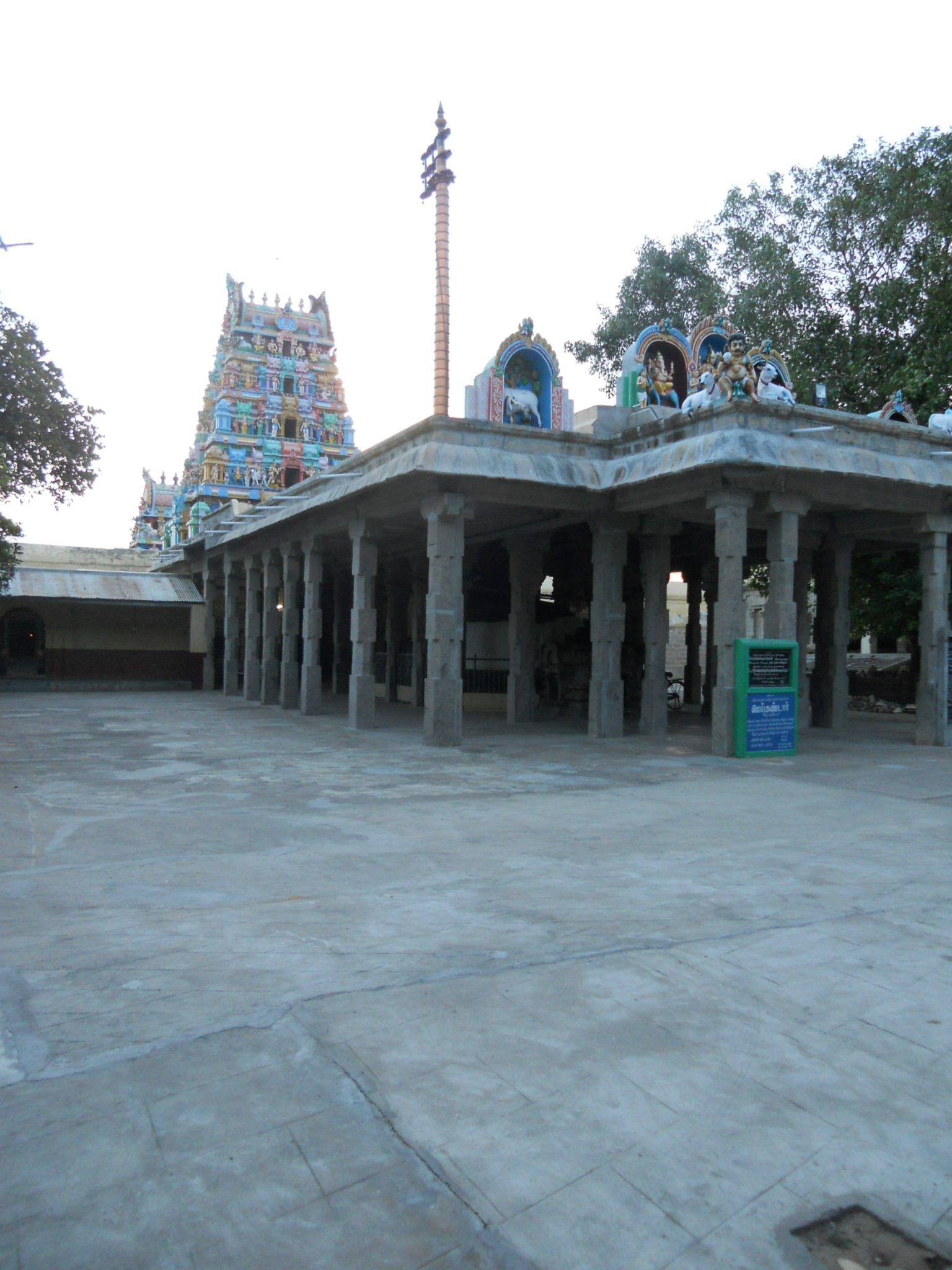
- Masilamaniswarar temple
- Interactive map of Thiruvaduthurai
- Country: India
- State: Tamil Nadu
- District: Mayiladuthurai

Languages
  - Official: Tamil
- Time zone: UTC+5:30 (IST)
- PIN: 609803
- Vehicle registration: TN-82
- Nearest city: Mayiladuthurai, Kumbakonam

Thiruvavaduthurai is a village in Mayiladuthurai district, east-central Tamil Nadu, South India, where the Masilamaniswara Temple is located. Thiruvaduthurai Adheenam, one of the prominent Saiva Aadheenams (monasteries) in South India, is located adjacent to the temple complex.

The village is known for the local production of seevali, which is the reed used when playing Nadaswaram.
