= Sheik Chinna Moulana =

Indian nagaswaram musician (1924–1999)

Dr. Sheik Chinna Moulana
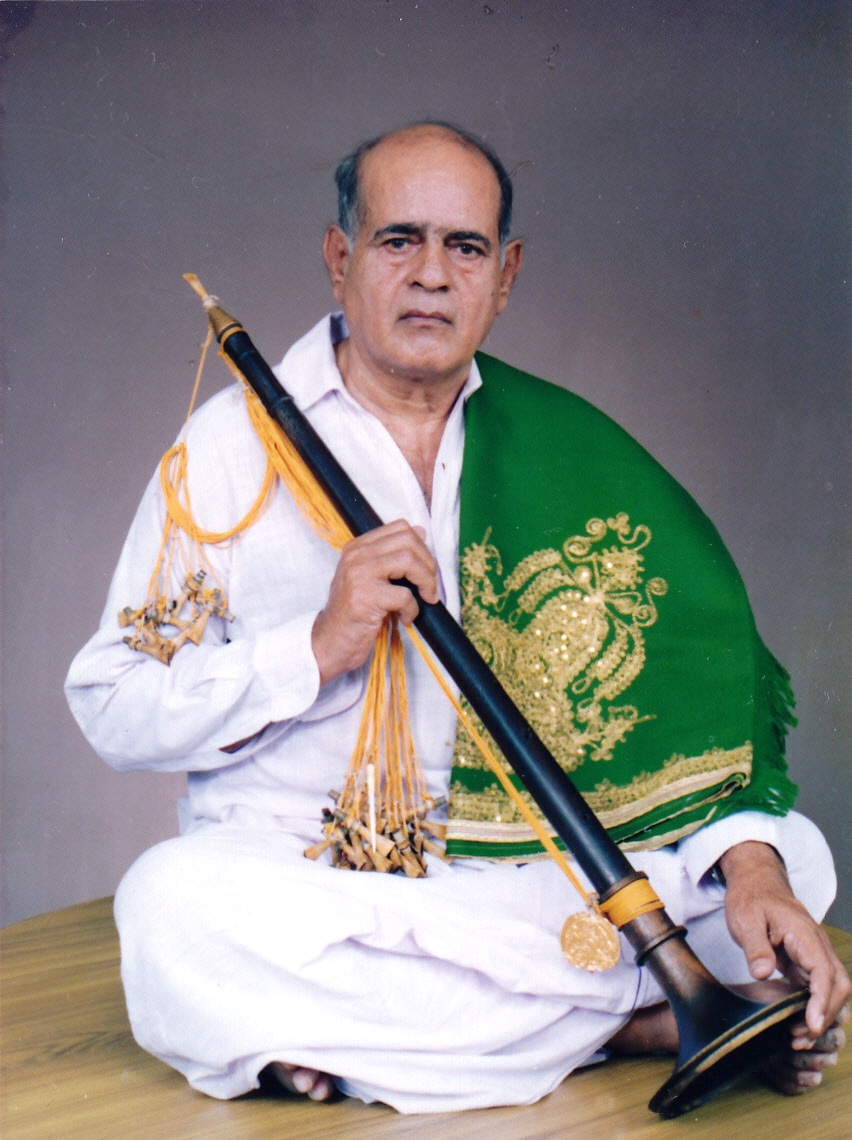

Background information
- Born: May 12, 1924, Karavadi, Prakasham, Andhra Pradesh
- Died: April 13, 1999, Srirangam, Tiruchirappalli, Tamil Nadu (aged 74)
- Genre: Carnatic Music
- Occupations: Musician
- Instruments: Nadhaswaram
- Years active: 1924–1999
- Website: kasimbabu.org

Sheik Chinna Moulana (12 May 1924, in Karavadi, Prakasam district, Andhra Pradesh – 13 April 1999, in Srirangam, Tamil Nadu), popularly known as Sheik, was a legendary nadhaswaram player in the Carnatic tradition. He was awarded the Madras Music Academy's Sangeetha Kalanidhi in 1998. He achieved high position through his outstanding control over the instrument, rendering the Kritis in the Gayaki style and for his extraordinary style of Raga Alapana.

== Tradition ==
Sheik Chinna Moulana hails from a family of music (nadhaswaram players). The ancient and traditional art of nadhaswaram playing had been preserved and fostered by the ancestors of Sheik Chinna Moulana, for the past 300 years. Following is list of the doyens who contributed to Chinna Moulana's tradition.

1. Vidhwan Adam Sahib – known for his expertise in the "Ragha – Devagandhari".

2. Vidhwan RasavAripalem Kasim sahib – learned musician known for his command of musical theory and practice.

3. Kommur Pitcha sahib – enriched the art of Nadhaswaram.

4. Vidhwan Chinna Moula Sahib and Pedda Moula Sahib brothers- Chinna Moula was well versed in Sanskrit epics like Ramayanam and Amaram and could expound these epics in Telugu.

5. The Kommur brothers Pentu Sahib and Silar sahib – were called geniuses for the Raghas Kalyani, Bilahari & Kedharagowla.

6. Chinna Peeru Sahib and Peddha Peeru Sahib Brothers – were famous for their proficiency in the Raghas Saveri and Abheri. Chinna Peeru was honoured with the title 'Nadha Brahma".

7. Sheik Adam sahib of Chilakaluripeta – Guru of Dr.Sheik Chinna Moulana – acclaimed fame for his Ragha Alapana.

8. Sheik Madar Sahib – Sheik Kasim Sahib Pair – were also geniuses. Madar Sahib was Chinn Moulan's Uncle and Kasim sahib was Chinna Moulana's father.

== Early life ==
Sheik Chinna Moulana was born in Karavadi Village, Prakasam district, Andhra Pradesh. Even at very early age he achieved proficiency in Nadhaswaram, first under the tutorship of his father Sheik Kasim Sahib and later Nadhaswara Vidwan Sri Throvagunta Shaik Hassan Saheb ( NadhaBrahma, Nadhaswara Dhaksha (Ref from "Andhrapradesh Nadhaswara & Dolu Kalakarula Charithra") and later under Sheik Adam Sahib, a renowned Nadhaswaram player of Chilakaluripeta, Andhra Pradesh. Recognizing the importance and the role of "Thanjavur Bhaani" (style of playing) he very much wanted to get trained in this. With this in view, he was under the tutelage of M/s. Rajam and Duraikannu brothers of Nachiarkovil (Thanjavur District – Tamil Nadu) for some years.

Chinna Moulana was a childhood admirer of T.N. Rajarathnam Pillai, and was inspired by his style of playing Nathaswaram from an early age.

== Career ==
Sheik Chinna Moulana gave his first performance in 60s in Tamil Nadu, India and quickly gained renown.

Sheik Chinna Moulana was an ardent devotee of Lord Ranganatha, which led him to reside in the pilgrim city of Srirangam.

He performed at the Third International Asian Trade Fair, New Delhi in the year 1972. He had also given performance at Red Fort, New Delhi during February 1973 at the invitation of Government of India on the occasion of the 25th Anniversary celebrations of India's Independence.

He has give performances widely both in India and abroad. He had visited Sri Lanka many times. He went to the United States and Canada in 1973 under the east–west exchange program. There he was awarded the title of "Nadhaswara Acharya" by Vassar College, New York. He visited Hong Kong in 1982 as an Indian Cultural delegate to the 7th Asian Arts Festival. He visited Soviet Union in 1987 during Sept. /Oct. to give concerts in the Festival of India there. He went to Germany in 1991 during September to give his inaugural concerts in the festival of India in Germany. He travelled all over Germany and gave concerts. He visited France too in 1991. He visited Finland in 1996 and performed in the International Music Festival there. He visited U.A.E in Sept. 1997 and took part in the Golden Jubilee Celebrations of India's Independence held in U.A.E.

He has give performances at many important centres. A few are (i) Tansen Festival- Gwalior.(i) SAARC Festival (iii) Teenmurthy Bhavan, New Delhi and so on. He gave a number of lecture demonstrations on Nadhaswaram music, both in home and abroad. He was appointed as the "State Artist" of Tamil Nadu by the Govt. of Tamil Nadu.

He was a Hon. Professor in the Raja's Government Music College of Thiruvaiyaru, Thanjavur District, Tamil Nadu.

== Awards ==
- "Mangala Vadhya Visaradha"- at Kumbakonam in 1964
- "Kalaimamani"- Govt. of Tamil Nadu in 1976
- "Padmasri"- Govt. of India in 1977
- "Central Sangeet Natak Academy award" – in 1977
- "Ganakala Prapooma"- Andhra Pradesh Sangeet Natak Academy in 1980
- "Gandharva Kalanidhi" – at Rajamundry( A.P)" in 1981
- "Madhura Kala Praveena" – Sadhguru Sangeetha Samajam, Madurai
- "Nadhaswara Kalanidhi" – Saraswathy Kala Samithy, Machilipatnam, Andhra Pradesh, in 1984
- "Sapthagiri Vidhwanmani"- Thyagaraja Festival Committee, Tirupati −1984
- "Akhila Bharatha Nadhaswara Eka Chakradhipathi" – Sri Jambukeshwar Dewasthanam, Trichy, in 1985
- "Hon. Degree of Doctorate" – Andhra University, Visakhapatnam in 1985
- "Honour by Telugu University"- at Hyderabad in 1987
- "Award of Senior Fellowship" – Govt. of India in 1988
- "Sangeetha Vidhwanmani" – Thyagaraja kala Samithy, Vijayawada – 1988
- "Emeritus Fellowship" – Awarded by the Govt. of India in 1993
- "Bridhu" awarded by H.H. Shri Jagadguru Srimad Bharathi Teertha Mahaswamy at Shringeri in 1993. Also appointed as the Asthana Vidhwan of Shringeri mutt
- "Sangeetha Kala Nipuna" – Mylapore Fine Arts Club, Madras on 11 December 1993 conferred by Shri. R. Venkatraman, President of India
- "Isai Peraringar" – Tamil Isai Sangam, Madras – conferred by Chief Minister of Tamil Nadu Dr. J. Jayalalitha on 21 December 1993
- "Sangeetha Rathna Mysore T. Chowdaiah National Award" – Conferred by Shri. K.R. Narayanan, Vice- President of India, at the academy of music, Bangalore on 4 March 1995.
- "Award of Rajarathna" – Muthamizh Peravai, Madras on 1 December 1995, conferred by Sri. M.Karunanidhi, Chief Minister of Tamil Nadu
- "Sangeetha Kalanidhi" – conferred by Music Academy, Chennai on 1 January 1999.

== Contribution ==
Having settled down in Srirangam in the heart of Tamil Nadu he had founded the "Saradha Nadhaswara Sangeetha Ashram" with the sole aim of imparting knowledge of music- Nadhaswaram playing in particular to younger generation and he achieved in producing a number of notable students from the Ashram.

Films Division (Govt. of India) made a film on Dr. Sheik Chinna Moulana (Non-feature Film). This film has been selected for the 31st National Film Festival of India (Indian Panorama-2000) and also for the International film Festival of India.

Dr.Sheik Chinna Moulana died on 13 April 1999 in Srirangam, aged 75 at the abode Lord Ranganatha after brief illness.

== Foundation of Dr. Sheik Chinna Moulana ==
After his death, his grandsons & disciples Kasim-Babu have established a Trust in memory of their Guru and grandfather – "Dr.Chinnamoulana Memorial Trust". The prime objective of the Trust is to globalise the importance of Nadhaswaram Music. The Trust is rendering noble service – by presenting Nadhswaram instruments to deserving students and also purses to senior indigent artistes of the Nadhaswaram fraternity.

== Family ==
Smt. Bibijan is the only daughter of Sheik Chinna Moulana. Chinna Moulana taught vocal music to his daughter. Sheik Subhan Sahib is the son in law and also disciple of Sheik Chinna Moulana. Subhan Sahib accompanied sheik in concerts for few years. Chinna Moulana has five grand sons and one granddaughter. Of his five grandsons, Chinna Moulana trained Kasim and Babu vigorously and the brothers accompanied Chinna Moulana in his concerts both in home and abroad for many years. Today, Kasim-Babu are the front ranking Nadhaswaram artistes and are the torch bearers of Chinnamoulana's tradition. Paul Sheik Chinna Kasim, one of the grandsons is actively involved in Christian ministry after his dramatic conversion to Christianity

== Discography ==
- Dr. Sheik Chinna Moulana – Vol-1 and Vol-2 – By Vani Recording Company
- Nadhaswara Samrat Sheik Chinna Moulana – Immortal series by "T-Series"
- Sheik Chinna Moulana Carnatic Instrumental-Nadhaswaram – by EMI – RPG
- Sheik Chinna Moulana – Nadhaswaram – By EMI Colombia
- Collectors Choice – Dr Sheik Chinna Moulana – Nadhaswaram – By Media dreams Ltd
- Great Master's Series – Dr.Sheik Chinna Moulana – By media Dreams Ltd
- Paddhathi – Sheik Chinna Moulana-Live Concert – Vol I & II – By Charsur Digital Work Station
