= Ongole mandal =

- Former mandal of Andhra Pradesh
- 1956–2023
- Capital: Ongole
- Population
  - 2011 Census: 253,122
- History
  - Established: 1956
  - Mandal reorganized: 8 May 2023
Succeeded by
Ongole Urban mandal; Ongole Rural mandal

Ongole mandal is a former mandal in Prakasam district of the state of Andhra Pradesh, India. It is administered under Ongole revenue division and its headquarters are located at Ongole. The mandal is bounded by Naguluppalapadu, Maddipadu, Santhanuthlapadu, and Kothapatnam Tangutur mandals. The mandals lies on the shore of Bay of Bengal. It was bifurcated into Ongole Urban mandal and Ongole Rural mandal on 8 May 2023.

== History ==
Ongole Mandal was formed in the year 1956.

== Demographics ==
As of 2011 census, the mandal had a population of 253,122. The total population constitute, 126,983 males and 126,139 females —a sex ratio of 993 females per 1000 males. 24,500 children are in the age group of 0–6 years, of which 12,635 are boys and 11,865 are girls —a ratio of 939 per 1000. The average literacy rate stands at 79.91% with 182,682 literates.

== Towns and villages ==
As of 2011 census, the mandal has 17 settlements, that includes:

1. Annavarapedu (Urban)
2. Chejarla (Rural)
3. Cheruvu Kommu Palem (Urban)
4. Devarampadu (Rural)
5. Gudimellapadu (Urban)
6. Koppolu (Urban)
7. Kothamamidipalem (Rural)
8. Mangaladripuram (Rural)
9. Mamidipalem (Urban)
10. Malleswarapuram (Urban)
11. Mukthinutalapadu (Urban)
12. Narasapuram (Urban)
13. Ongole (Urban)
14. Pelluru (Urban)
15. Sarvereddypalem (Rural)
16. Ulichi (Rural)
17. Vengamukkalapalem (Urban)
18. Voletivaripalem (Rural)
19. Yerrajerla (Rural)

Sources:

- Census India 2011 (sub districts)
- Revenue Department of AP

== See also ==
- Prakasam district
