= Kottur Kozhundeeswarar Temple =

Coordinates: 10.615255°N 79.562179°E

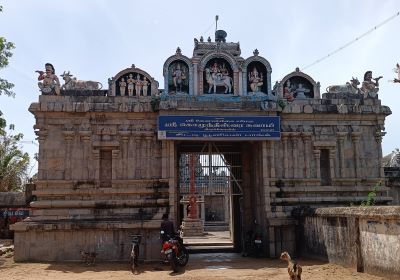
Entrance

Kottur Kozhundeeswarar Temple (கோட்டூர் கொழுந்தீஸ்வரர் கோயில்) is a Hindu temple located at Kottur in Tiruvarur district, Tamil Nadu, India. The temple is dedicated to Shiva, as the moolavar presiding deity, in his manifestation as Kozhundeeswarar. His consort, Parvati, is known as Thenambikai. The historical name of the place is Indirapuram.

== Significance ==
It is one of the shrines of the 275 Paadal Petra Sthalams — Shiva Sthalams glorified in the early medieval Tevaram poems by Tamil Saivite Nayanar Tirugnanasambandar.
