= Uma Maheswarar Temple, Konerirajapuram =

Shiva temple in Tamil Nadu, India

Umamaheswarar Temple
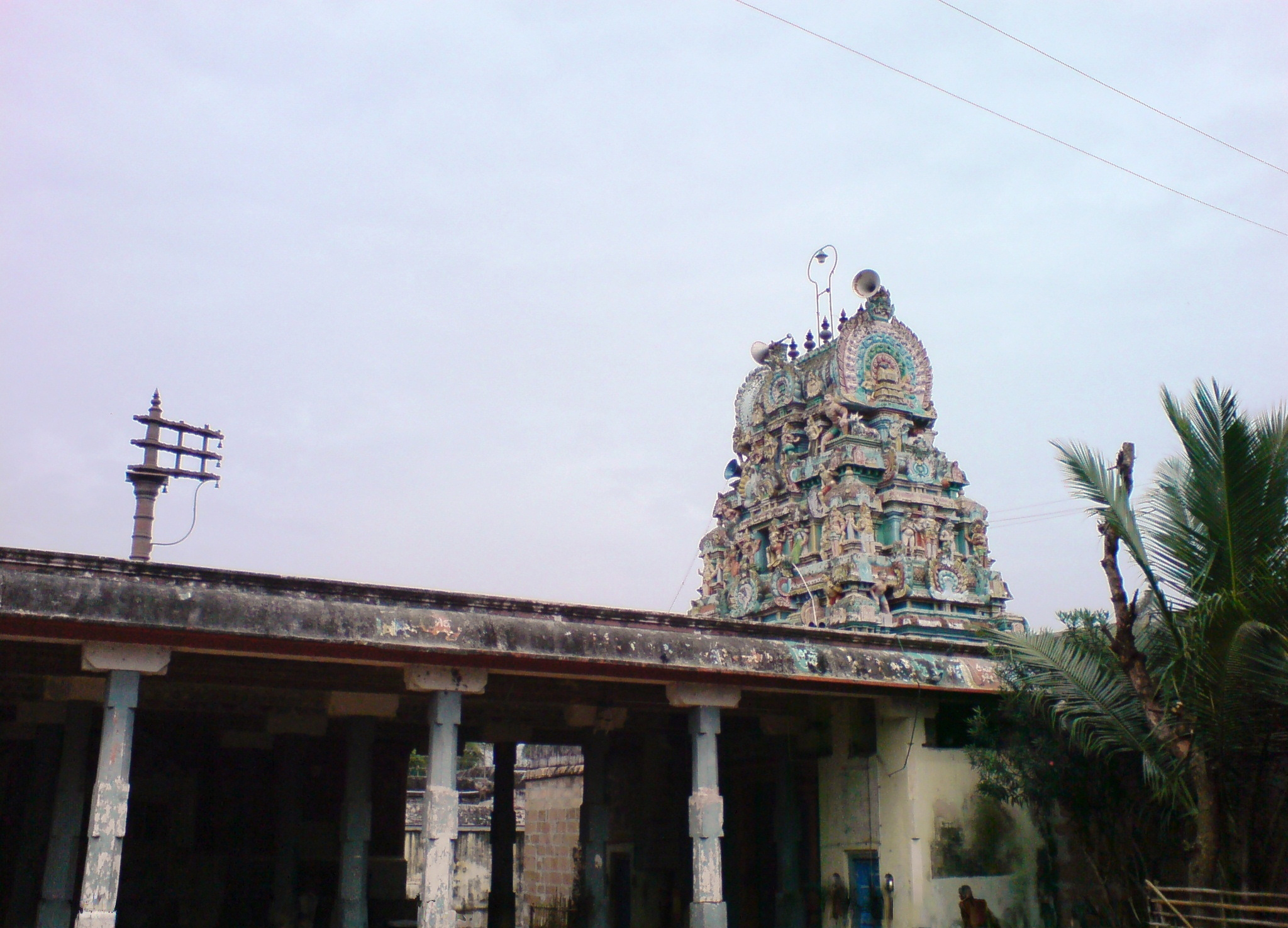

- Location in Tamil Nadu

Religion
- Affiliation: Hinduism
- District: Mayiladuthurai
- Deity: Uma Maheswarar (Shiva), Mangala Nayaki (Parvathi)

Location
- Location: Konerirajapuram, Tamil Nadu, India
- State: Tamil Nadu
- Country: India
- Coordinates: 10.97°N 79.53°E

Architecture
- Type: Tamilan
- Completed: 1000-2000 years old
- Inscriptions: 22

Uma Maheswarar Temple of Konerirajapuram in the Mayiladuthurai district in the South Indian state of Tamil Nadu, is a historical temple dedicated to Shiva. Shiva is worshiped as Uma Maheswarar, and is represented by the lingam and his consort Parvati is depicted as Mattuvar Kuzhalammai. The presiding deity is revered in the 7th century Tamil Saiva canonical work, the Tevaram, written by Tamil saint poets known as the nayanars and classified as Paadal Petra Sthalam.

Originally built by the Mighty Cholas, it was later renovated by the Madurai Nayaks and Vijayanagara rulers. The major complex in the temple are believed to be built during the 8th century by the Chola king Aditya I and his great great grandson Raja Raja Chola I.

The temple has six daily rituals at various times from 6:00 a.m. to 12 pm and 5 p.m. to 9 p.m., and twelve yearly festivals on its calendar. The Chittirai festival during the Tamil month of Chittirai (April - May) is celebrated for fifteen days, portraying the various incidents associated with the temple legend. The temple is maintained and administered by the Hindu Religious and Endowment Board of the Government of Tamil Nadu.

== Etymology ==
Appar refers to the place as Tirunallam in his Devaram hymns and calls the presiding deity Umaikku-nallavan, meaning "He who is dear to Uma". The name reflects the association of the temple's presiding deity, Shiva, with the goddess Uma.

== Legend ==
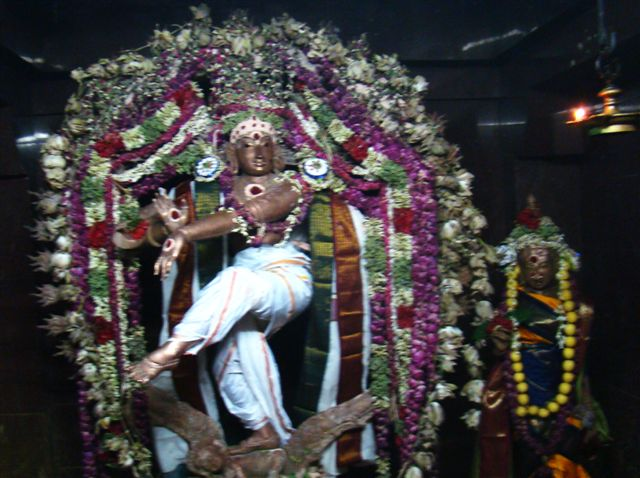
Konerirajapuram Nataraja

According to local tradition, the temple was originally known as Bhumisvaram, as it is believed to have been built by Bhumidevi under the instructions of Mahavishnu. Another legend associates the temple with King Pururavas, who is said to have been cured of leprosy after worshipping Shiva. In gratitude, he is believed to have gilded the temple's vimana with gold and instituted a festival on the full moon day of the Tamil month of Vaikasi (April–May). The presiding deity is Shiva, worshipped as Umaikku-nallavan, and the goddess is Angavala Nayaki. The temple is also praised in the Devaram hymns of Sambandar and Thirunavukkarasar. The temple complex contains shrines dedicated to Brahma, Vishnu, Ganesha and Murugan, who is worshipped as Vaidyanathaswami.

== History ==
The existence of the temple is suggested by the Devaram hymns of Appar, dating to the 7th century CE. The present stone temple was built by Sembiyan Mahadevi in memory of her deceased husband, Gandaraditya Chola, during the reign of her son Uttama Chola. The temple is believed to have been constructed before the third regnal year of Uttama Chola, as an inscription (No. 635 of 1909) from that year records a land grant for a flower garden associated with the temple, which was then known as Gandaradittam.

=== Inscriptions ===
The temple contains inscriptions dating from the reigns of Uttama Chola, Rajaraja I, Rajendra I, Rajadhiraja I, Rajendra II, Kulottunga I, Kulottunga III and Rajaraja III. The temple contains at least 22 recorded inscriptions record grants of land, gold, paddy and money for temple maintenance, perpetual lamps, flower gardens, daily worship, food offerings and festivals. Other endowments include silver and bronze images, jewels, and provisions for feeding Brahmins. The inscriptions also document the activities of the village assembly (Sabha), temple administration and the allocation of resources for religious and charitable purposes.

== Architecture ==
The temple faces west and is an example of early Chola architecture associated with the reign of Uttama Chola. The main shrine consists of a square garbhagriha, an antarala and an ardhamandapa. The outer walls of the sanctum feature devakoshtas containing sculptures of Brahma, Lingodbhava and Dakshinamurti. The walls of the ardhamandapa contain sculptures of Natesa, Ganesha, Agastya, Bhikshatanamurti, Durga and Ardhanarisvara, among others.

A covered pillared verandah, known as the Tiru-nadai-maligai in the inscriptions, surrounds the garbhagriha, antarala and ardhamandapa. The temple also has a mukhamandapa, possibly identifiable with the Pugalabharana Mandapa mentioned in an inscription of Kulottunga III. The present eight-sided, curvilinear sikhara is a later addition.

This temple is famous for its beautiful paintings found in the front mandapa and the miniature sculptures found outside the sanctum sanctorum of the presiding deity.

== Worship and festivals ==
The temple priests perform the pooja (rituals) during festivals and on a daily basis. Like other Shiva temples of Tamil Nadu, the priests belong to the Shaivaite community, a Brahmin sub-caste. The temple rituals are performed six times a day; Ushathkalam at 5:30 a.m., Kalasanthi at 8:00 a.m., Uchikalam at 10:00 a.m., Sayarakshai at 6:00 p.m., Irandamkalam at 8:00 p.m. and Ardha Jamam at 10:00 p.m. Each ritual comprises four steps: abhisheka (sacred bath), alangaram (decoration), neivethanam (food offering) and deepa aradanai (waving of lamps) for both Uma Maheswarar and Mattuvar Kuzhal Amman. The worship is held amidst music with nagaswaram (pipe instrument) and tavil (percussion instrument), religious instructions in the Vedas read by priests and prostration by worshippers in front of the temple mast. There are weekly rituals like somavaram and sukravaram, fortnightly rituals like pradosham and monthly festivals like amavasai (new moon day), kiruthigai, pournami (full moon day) and sathurthi. Abhishekam is done to Lord Nataraja 6 times in a year. Maasi, Avani, Puratasi on Valarpirai Chathurtasi thithi days, and Chithirai Thiruvonam, Aani Uthram, Marghazi Thiruvathirai star days The temple is counted as one of the temples built on the banks of River Kaveri.

== Gallery ==
=== Paintings ===
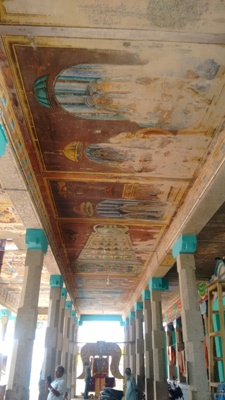

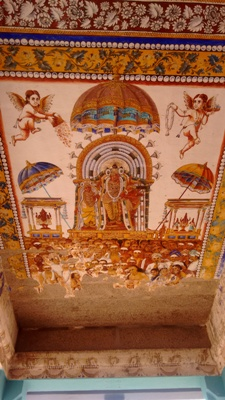

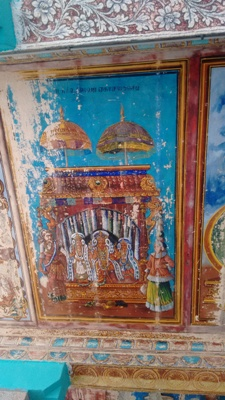

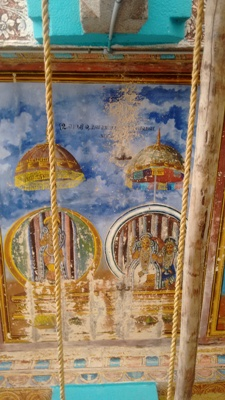

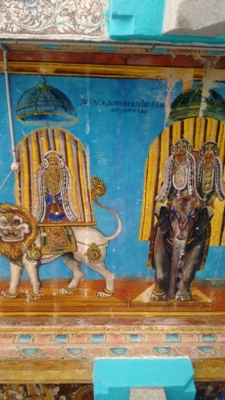

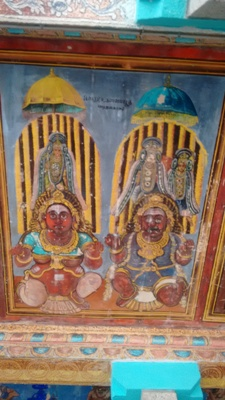

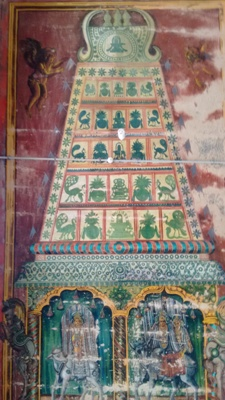

=== Miniature Sculptures ===
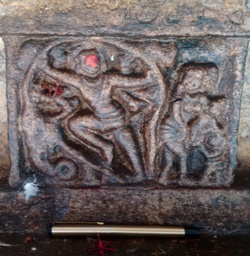

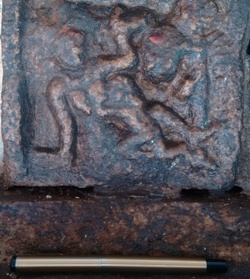

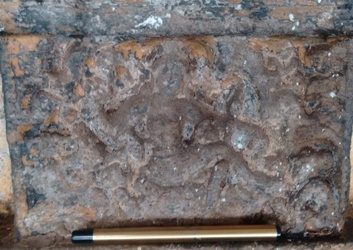

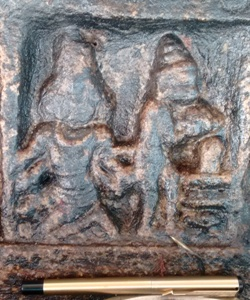

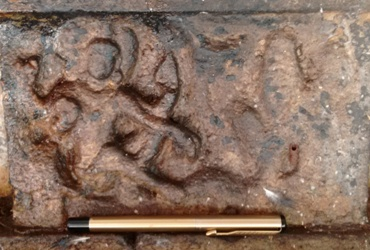

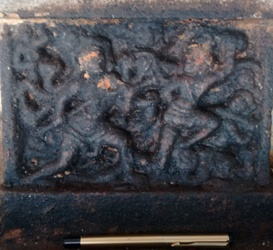

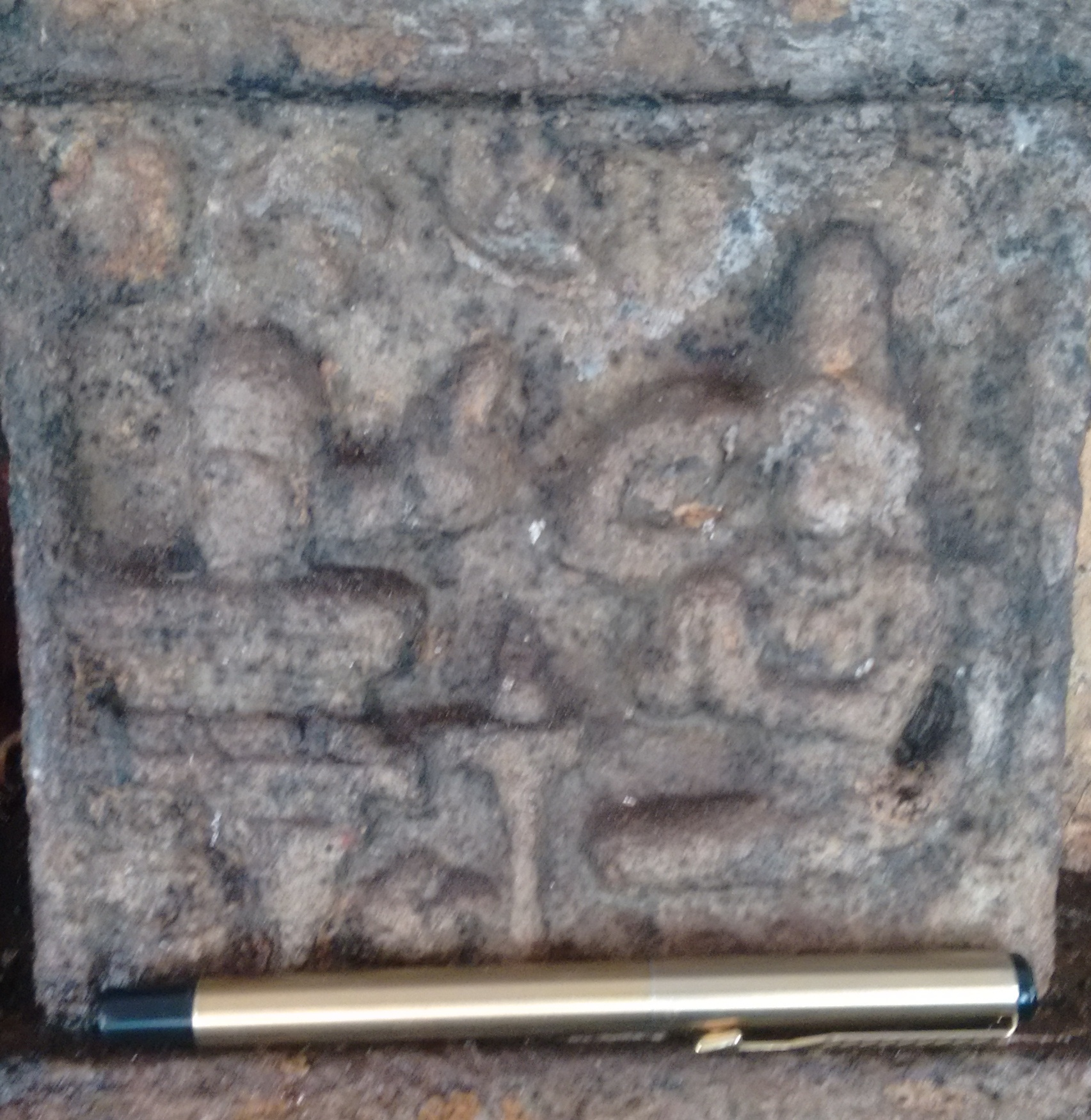
