= Cheruvu Kommu Palem, Darsi mandal =

Cheruvu Kommu Palem
- Village
- Interactive map of Cheruvu Kommu Palem
- Location in Andhra Pradesh
- Coordinates: 15°45′07″N 79°46′40″E
- Country: India
- State: Andhra Pradesh
- District: Prakasam
- Mandal: Darsi

Population (2011)
  - Total: 1,188

Languages
  - Official: Telugu, Urdu
- Time zone: UTC+5:30 (IST)
- Telephone code: 08646
- Vehicle registration: AP 07 or AP 08
- Sex ratio: 1.00 ♂/♀
- Climate: Tropical (Aw–As Köppen)
- Precipitation: 889.1 millimetres (35.00 in)
- Avg. annual temperature: 27 °C (81 °F)
- Avg. summer temperature: 40 °C (104 °F)
- Avg. winter temperature: 18.6 °C (65.5 °F)

Cheruvu Kommu Palem is a village in Darsi mandal, Prakasam district, of the Indian state of Andhra Pradesh.

== Demographics ==
In the 2011 census, Cheruvu Kommu Palem had a population of 1,188 inhabitants, with 613 males and 575 females living in 279 households. Telugu is the official language, but Urdu is also spoken by large numbers of inhabitants.
