= Konerirajapuram =

- village
- Country: India
- State: Tamil Nadu
- District: Mayiladuthurai

Population (2001)
  - Total: 4,658

Languages
  - Official: Tamil
- Time zone: UTC+5:30 (IST)
- PIN: 612201
- Telephone code: 91-435

Konerirajapuram is a village in the Mayiladuthurai taluk of Mayiladuthurai district, Tamil Nadu, India. It is famous for the Uma Maheswarar Temple. It was also known as Thirunallam.

== Demographics ==
As of 2001 census, Konerirajapuram had a total population of 4658. The sex ratio was 932. The literacy rate was 71.

Konerirajapuram is 22 km away from Kumbakonam by road. It is approximately 5 km towards the south from S. Pudur on the Kumbakonam — Karaikkal road. It is famous for its Shiva temple which also has a bronze statue of Lord Natraja.

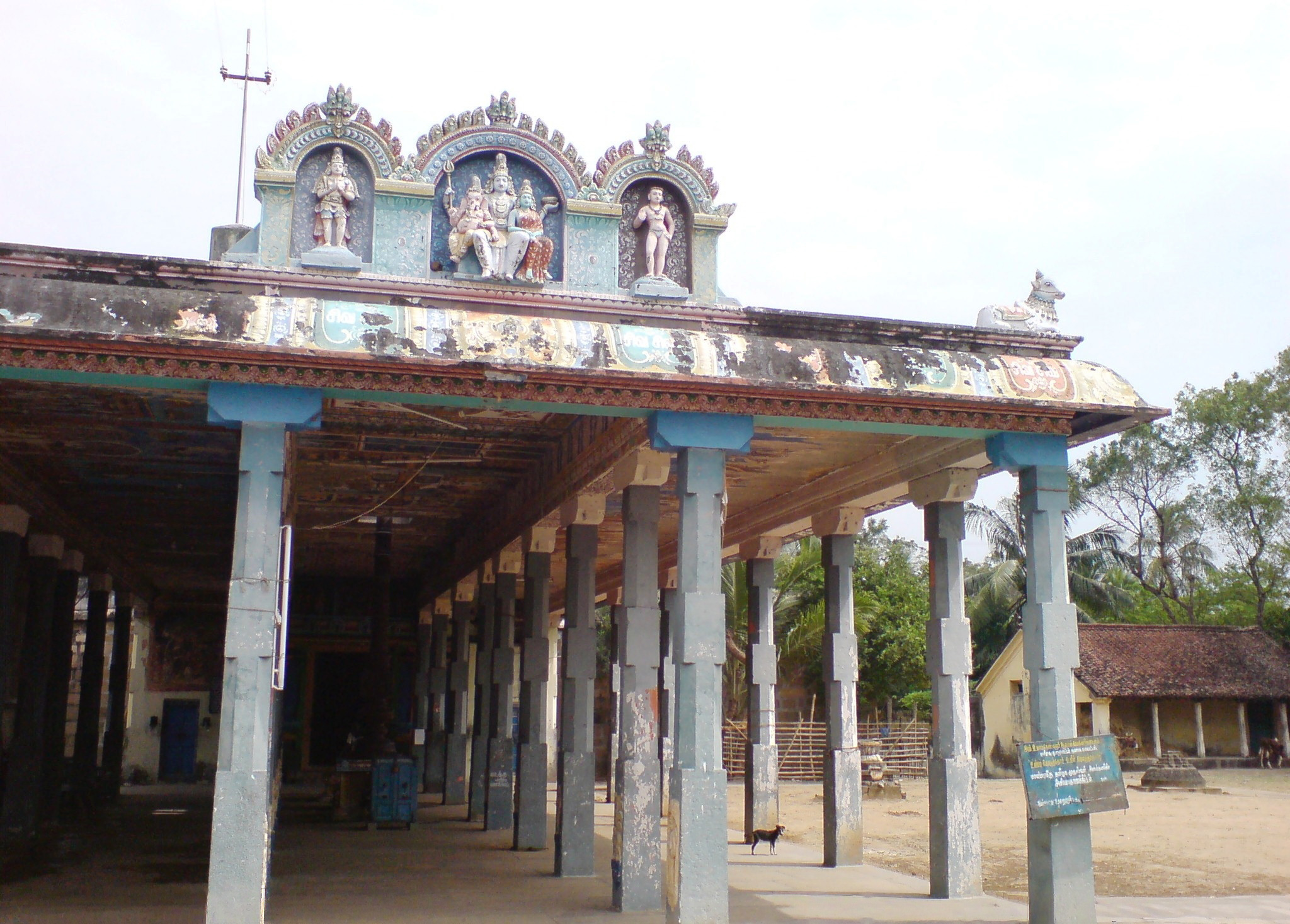
Konerirajapuram Shiva Temple

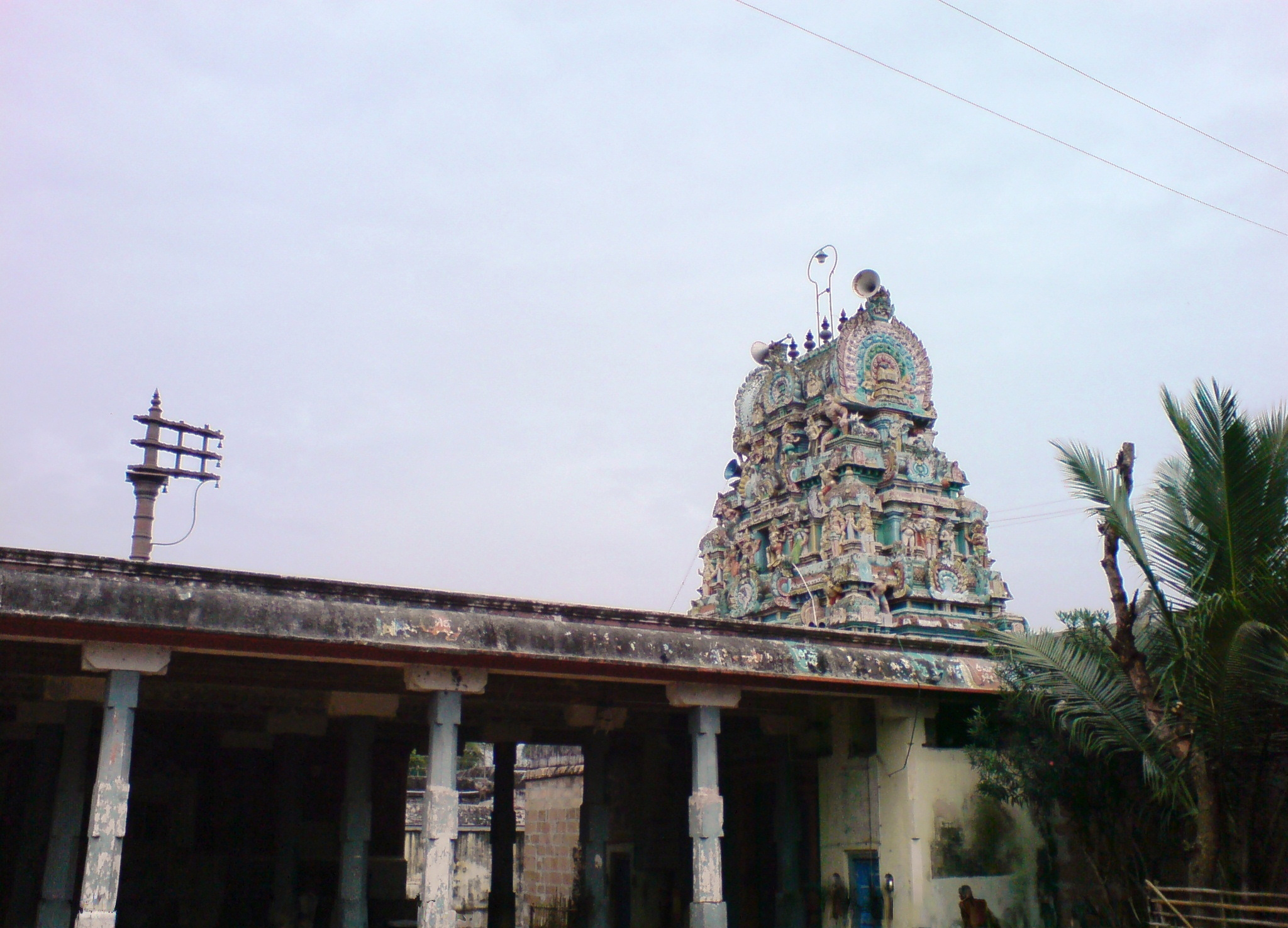
Konerirajapuram - Sri Uma Maheswarar Temple
