= Cheruvu Kommu Palem, Ongole mandal =

Cheruvu Kommu Palem
- Village
- Interactive map of Cheruvu Kommu Palem
- Location in Andhra Pradesh
- Country: India
- State: Andhra Pradesh
- District: Prakasam
- Mandal: Ongole mandal
- Elevation: 75 m (246 ft)

Population (2011)
  - Total: 3,062

Languages
  - Official: Telugu, Urdu
- Time zone: UTC+5:30 (IST)
- Telephone code: 08646
- Vehicle registration: AP 07 or AP 08
- Sex ratio: 1.00 ♂/♀
- Climate: Tropical (Aw–As Köppen)
- Precipitation: 889.1 millimetres (35.00 in)
- Avg. annual temperature: 27 °C (81 °F)
- Avg. summer temperature: 40 °C (104 °F)
- Avg. winter temperature: 18.6 °C (65.5 °F)

Cheruvu Kommu Palem is a village in Ongole mandal, Prakasam district, of the Indian state of Andhra Pradesh.

== Geography and climate ==
Cheruvu Kommu Palem's has a tropical savanna climate. The weather varies considerably, depending on the seasonal periods. July to September is the seasons for tropical rains, which play a major role in determining the climate of the village, and the village receives heavy rainfall from southwestern summer monsoons during these months. Summers last from March to June. The range of the average temperature is generally 18.6 °C (65.5 °F), during the winter, to 40 °C (104 °F) in summer. The average rainfall is about 889 millimetres (35.0 in).

== Demographics ==
In the 2011 census, Cheruvu Kommu Palem had a population of 3,062 inhabitants, with 1,527 males and 1,535 females living in 829 households. Telugu is the official language, but Urdu is also spoken by large numbers of inhabitants.
