= Thiruveezhimizhalai =

Thiruvizhimizhalai
- Village
- Location in Tamil Nadu, India Thiruvizhimizhalai (India)
- Coordinates: 10.9467°N 79.5735°E
- Country: India
- State: Tamil Nadu
- District: Tiruvarur
- Elevation: 35.79 m (117.4 ft)

Population (2001)
  - Total: 3,022

Languages
  - Official: Tamil
- Time zone: UTC+5:30 (IST)

Thiruvizhimizhalai is a village in the Kudavasal taluk of Tiruvarur district, Tamil Nadu, India.

== Demographics ==
As per 2011 census of India, the total population of Thiruvizhimizhalai was 3,166, out of which 1,590 persons were males and 1,576 persons were females.
