= Shivapuram =

Sivapuram may refer to places in India:

- Sivapuram, Kerala, a village in Kannur district
- Sivapuram, Tamil Nadu, a village in Thanjavur district
- Sivapuram, Thiruvallur, a village in Thiruvallur district, Tamil Nadu

== See also ==
- Shivpur (disambiguation)
