= Sivapuram =

Sivapuram may refer to:

- Sivapuram, Kerala, a village in Kannur district, India
- Sivapuram, Tamil Nadu, a village in Thanjavur district, India
- Sivapuram, Thiruvallur, a village in Thiruvallur district, India
- Sivapuram (film) starring Bala
