= Shivpur =

Shivpur, Shivapuri or Shivapura may refer to:

- Varanasi or Kashi, holy city in India, known as Shivpur - the city of Shiva
- Shivpur or seepur, Mashobra Shimla
- Shivpuri or Shivapura, Madhya Pradesh
- Shibpur or Shivapura, West Bengal
- Sivapuram, Thanjavur district, Tamil Nadu
- Sivapuram, Kerala, a village in Kannur district
- Sivapuram, Tamil Nadu, a village in Thanjavur district
- Shivapuri Nagarjun National Park, just north of Kathmandu, Nepal
- Shivpur (Assembly constituency), Uttar Pradesh
- Mandhata or Shivapuri, an island in the Narmada river in Khandwa district, Madhya Pradesh, India

== See also ==
- Shivpuri (disambiguation)
- Shivapuram (disambiguation)
- Shibpur (disambiguation)
