= Kanhileri =

- Village
- Location in Kerala, India Kanhileri (India)
- Coordinates: 11.8863066°N 75.5914364°E
- Country: India
- State: Kerala
- District: Kannur

Government
  - Body: Maloor Grama Panchayat

Languages
  - Official: Malayalam, English
- Time zone: UTC+5:30 (IST)
- ISO 3166 code: IN-KL
- Vehicle registration: KL 59
- Literacy: 99%

Kanhileri is a village in Maloor panchayat in Kannur district in the Indian state of Kerala.

== Nearby villages ==
Sivapuram, Kerala,

Tholambra
