= Sundarar =

8th-century Indian poet

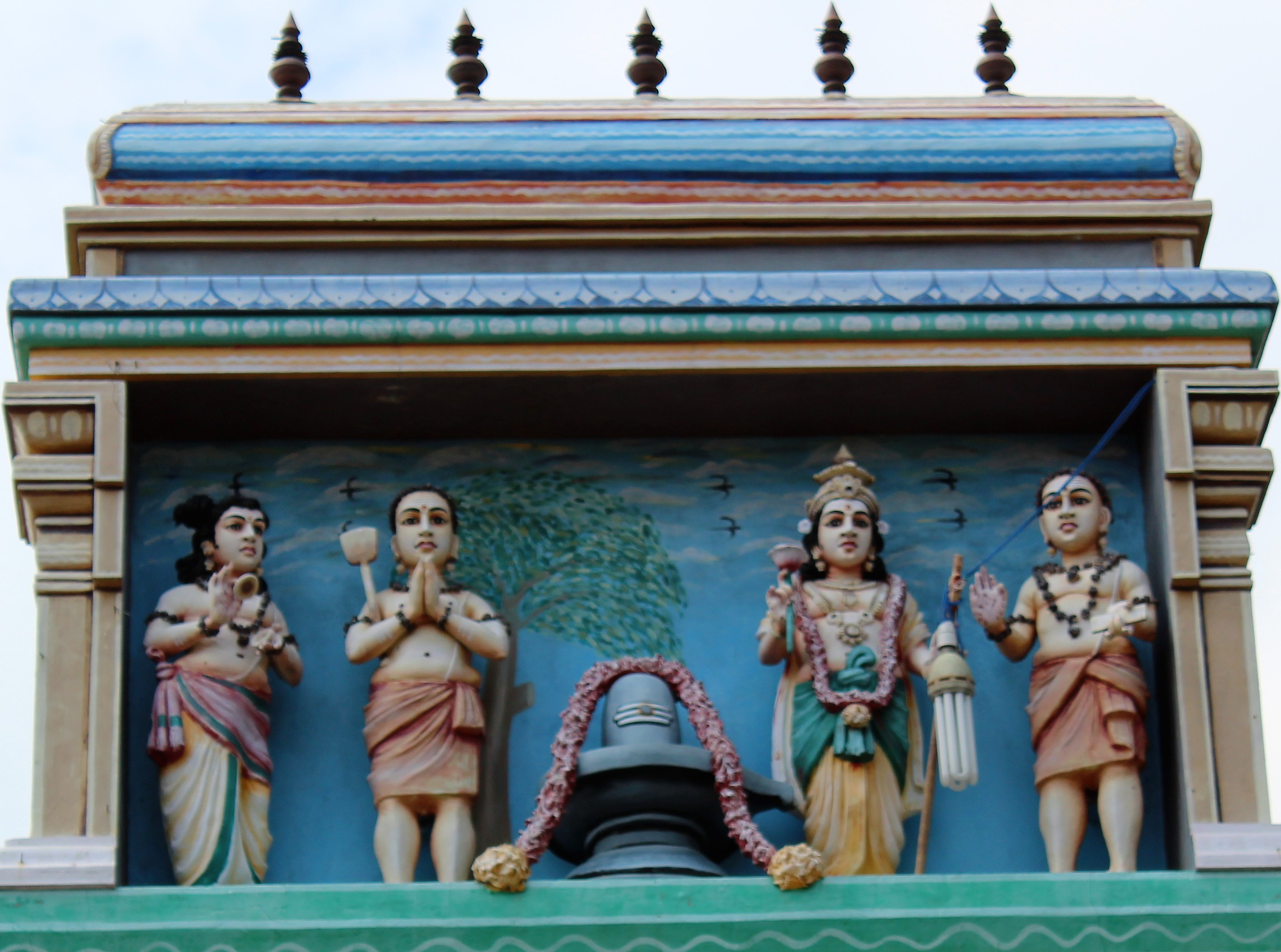
- Sundarar, the poet-saint third from left

Personal life
- Born: Tirunavalur
- Notable work: Tevaram
- Honors: Nayanar

Religious life
- Religion: Hinduism
- Philosophy: Shaivism

Sundarar (Tamil: சுந்தரர், romanized: Cuntarar), also referred to as Chuntarar, Chuntaramurtti, Nampi Aruran or Tampiran Tolan, was an eighth-century poet-saint of Tamil Shaiva Siddhanta tradition of Hinduism. He is among the Tevaram trio, and one of the most prominent Nayanars, the Shaiva bhakti (devotional) poets of Tamil Nadu.

His hymns form the seventh volume of the Tirumurai called Thiruppattu, the twelve-volume compendium of Shaiva Siddhanta. His songs are considered the most musical in Tirumurai in Tamil language. His life and his hymns in the Tevaram are broadly grouped in four stages. First, his cancelled arranged marriage through the intervention of Shiva in the form of a mad petitioner and his conversion into a Shaiva devotee. Second, his double marriage to temple dancers Paravai and Cankali with their stay together in Tiruvarur. Third, his blindness and then return of his sight. Finally, his reflections on wealth and material goods.

== Names ==
Sundarar is referred to by many names. Sundarar (Cuntarar) means "the lovely, handsome one". He was adopted by regional feudatory dedicated to Shiva, and that brought the name "Aruran". Peers and the generations that followed him called him "Tampiran Tolan", which means "intimate companion, dedicated friend of the lord [Shiva]".

== Life ==
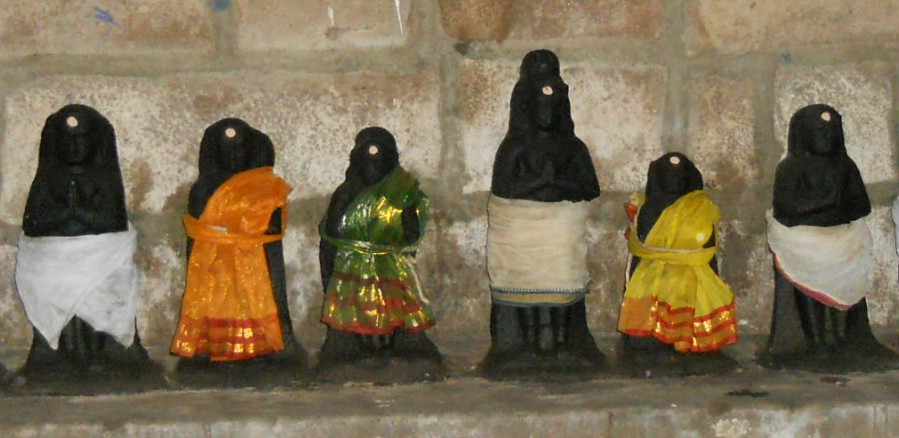
Family of Sundarar (l->r): Sadaya Nayanar (father), Isaignaniyar (mother), Paravai Nachiyar (wife), Sundarar, Sangili Nachiyar (wife), Narasinga Muniyaraiyar (foster-father).

The Tevaram hymns compositions of Sundarar are a source of biographical information about him, as are the hagiographic texts written about him few centuries after he died. Sundarar was born in Tirunavalur in a Shaiva Brahmin family to Sadaiya Nayanar and Isaignaniyar towards the end of the 7th century. He was adopted by the Narasinga Munaiaraiyar Kashatriya family, a Pallava feudatory (Thirumunaipadi-Nadu, an adoption that gave him a luxurious childhood.

Sundarar is unique among the Nayanars in that both of his birth parents are also recognized as Nayanars (poet-saints of Tamil Shaivism). They were temple priests and accepted the adoption request of the local feudatory. Once he came of age, his adopted family arranged his marriage. However, as the wedding party approached the local Shiva temple, states the traditional legend, an old man mysteriously appears and produces a palm leaf document. The document stated that Sundarar was bonded to serve him, the old man, his master. A court of elders then reviews the document and finds it authentic, demands Sundarar to serve the petitioner, who then mysteriously vanishes in the Shiva shrine. Sundarar views this as a command to cancel the wedding and serve Shiva in the Tiruvarur temple.

Sundarar began his first poem (Tevaram VII.1.1) by addressing Shiva as Pittaa pirai chudi.. meaning O mad man..:

O madman with the moon-crowned hair,
God of grace,
O Lord, how can I forget you?
You dwell forever in my heart,
In Arutturai, shrine of grace,
in Venneynallur on Pennai's southern bank,
you took me for your own–
how can I deny you now?
– Translated by Indira Peterson

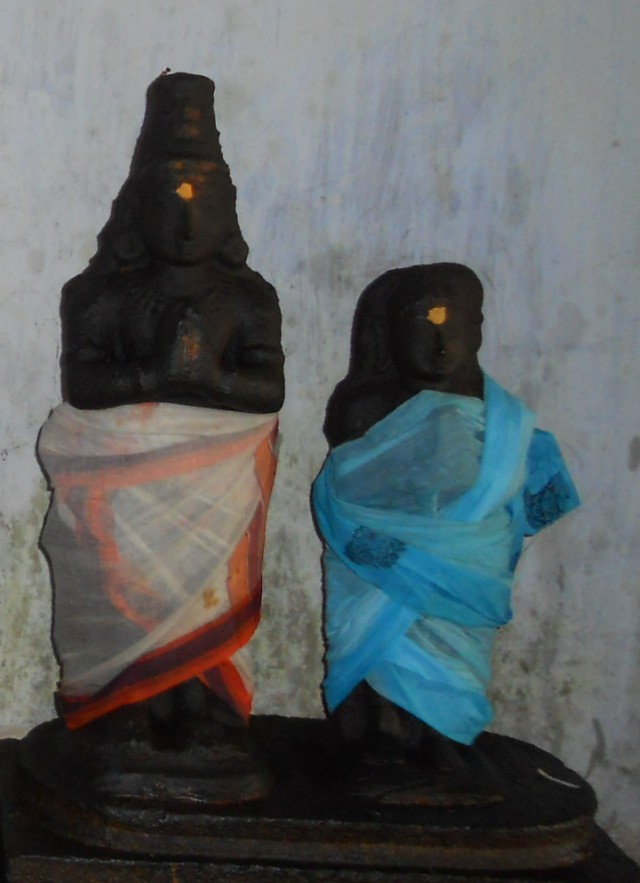
Sundarar (left) with Paravayar (Paravai Nachiyar).

In the next stage of his life, Sundarar moved around Tamil Nadu, visiting Shiva Temples of Tamil Nadu. In Tiruvarur, he fell in love with a temple dancer named Paravayar, and married her. After few years of married life, Sundarar visits the Siva temple in Thiruvottriyur, a sea-side suburb of Madras. There he meets and is enamoured by a peasant Vellala girl Cankali. With the help of Shiva, this leads to Sundarar's second marriage, but only after his wedding vows include the promise of never leaving Cankali and Thiruvottriyur. After marrying his second wife, Sundarar misses his first wife Paravai. He does not keep his word, and leaves for Tiruvarur. The broken vow causes him to go blind before he reaches Tiruvarur. His suffering thereafter are part of several Tevaram hymns. As a blind man, he visits many Shiva shrines and sings there. Slowly in stages, he becomes closer to Shiva and recovers his sight.

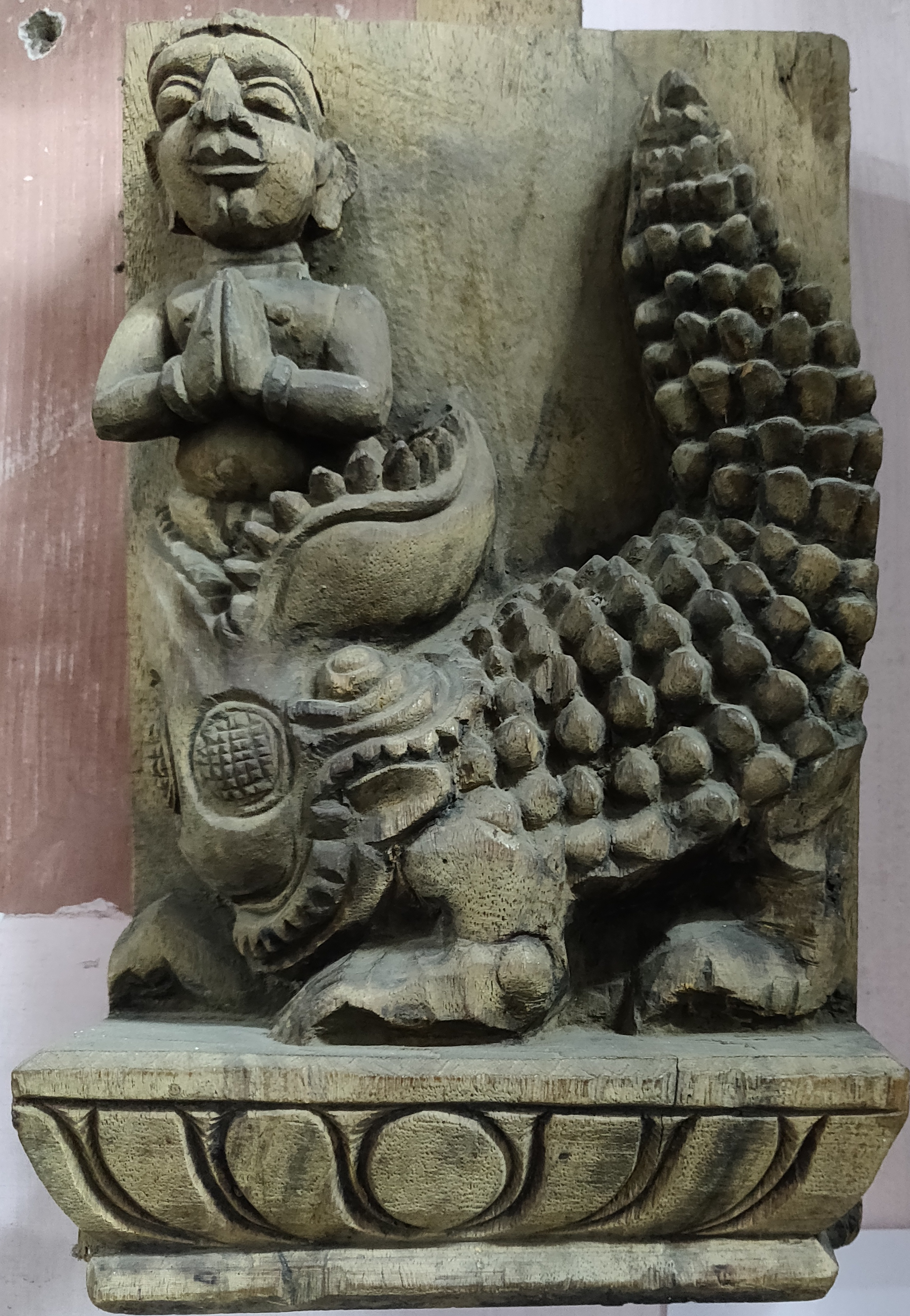
Scene of boy coming back to life from crocodile after Sundarar sings hymn—Wooden sculpture.

Another legends states that Cheraman Perumal Nayanar – the king of the region now known as Kerala, heard of him and came to Tiruvarur. Both embarked on a pilgrimage together. He died during this pilgrimage. Zvelebil estimates that Sundarar died about 730 CE.

In his later hymns, he presents his spiritual discussions with Shiva on how to achieve both spiritual succor and material wealth in life. He seeks the latter to provide for his family and to pay for the charitable temple kitchen that fed hundreds of Shaiva pilgrims. Shiva becomes his patron king, grants him grain, gold and a flashing sword. This is embedded symbolism to inspire regional kings and wealthy patrons to support the spiritual and charitable works at Shiva temples.

== Compilation ==
Om symbol Tirumurai Om symbol in Tamil
The twelve volumes of Tamil Śaiva hymns of the sixty-three Nayanars
Parts	Name	Author
1,2,3	(Tevaram) Thirukkadaik Kaappu	Sambandar
4,5,6	Tevaram	Thirunavukkarasar
7	(Tevaram) Thiruppattu	Sundarar
8	Thiruvasakam & Thirukkovaiyar	Manickavasagar
9	Thiruvisaippa & Thirupallandu	Various
10	Thirumandhiram	Thirumular
11	Saiva Prabandham	Various
12	Periya Puranam	Sekkizhar
Paadal Petra Sthalam
Paadal Petra Sthalam
Rajaraja I
Nambiyandar Nambi

Like the Tevaram trio, Sundarar's hymns were passed on through the oral tradition for a few centuries. Sometime around 1000 CE, Raja Raja Chola I (985-1013 CE) heard short excerpts of Shiva hymns in his court. He then embarked on a mission to recover the hymns. He sought the help of Nambiyandar Nambi, who was a priest in a Ganesha temple.

Nambi, states the tradition, prayed before Ganesha for success in finding the manuscripts. Nambi found the scripts in the form of cadijam leaves half eaten by white ants in a chamber inside the second precinct in Thillai Nataraja Temple, Chidambaram. Tradition attributes this discovery to Shiva's intervention. The temple priests of Chidambaram refused to let Nampi and king to take the manuscript from the temple. They said that their temple rules demand that this can only happen if the Tevaram trio come to the temple. The king then had stone idols of the three poet-saints built and brought them to the temple in royal procession. Once the Tevaram trio images were consecrated, the temple priests allowed Nambi to take the manuscript for his studies and compilation. This, states Vasu, began the tradition of placing Nayanar statues in large Tamil Shiva temples.

Nambi arranged the hymns of three saint poets Sambandar, Appar and Sundarar as the first seven books. Sundarar's composition is compiled in the seventh volume of the Tevaram. It consists of 100 hymns, consisting of 1026 stanzas.

Sundarar compositions have a signature last stanza, where he links his hymns to Shiva, the Vedas or a temple location, and the benefits of reciting or listening to that hymns. For example, at the end of hymn VII.54:

Those who know these ten verses
that Uran, the Rude Devotee,
chanter of the four Vedas and sacred texts,
praised by the world,
very pious young man,
has sung on the dear one,
who dwells at the shrine in wave-washed Orriyur,
will surely reach the highest state.
– Translated by Indira Peterson

== Legacy ==
Sundarar shared the same respect as Sambandar and Appar for the Vedas. Together, they connected the Vedic ritual to the temple Agamic puja that is ever since followed in Shiva temples. According to John Cort – a scholar of Jainism and Hinduism studies, the Agamic temple rituals perpetuate the Vedic practices. The efforts of the Tevaram trio and other Nayanars helped transform this "as the central element of the Saiva Siddhanta philosophical and theological system, and thus of Tamil Saiva soteriology", states Cort, by emphasizing the instrumentality and efficacy of the temple and its rituals. According to the Nayanars, the Vedic and the Agamic overlap, are alternate roads to the same spiritual end, both evoke a transformation in the devotee, with the difference that temple-based Saiva puja alone is emphasized.

The Shiva temple-centered community tradition has thrived among Tamils since the times of Sambandar, Appar and Sundarar. Odhuvars, Sthanikars, or Kattalaiyars offer musical programmes in Shiva temples of Tamil Nadu by singing Tevaram after the daily rituals. These are usually carried out as chorus programme soon after the divine offering. The singing of Tevaram was followed by musicals from the music pillars in such temples like Madurai Meenakshi Amman Temple, Nellaiappar Temple and Suchindram. The singers of these hymns were referred as Tirupadiyam Vinnapam seyvar or Pidarar, from the inscriptions of Nandivarman III in the Tiruvallam Bilavaneswara temple records. Rajaraja deputed 48 pidarars and made liberal provisions for their maintenance and successors.

=== Translations ===
Francis Kingsbury and GE Phillips selected and translated 15 out of 100 of Sundarar's hymns into English in 1921. These were published with small collection of Sambandar and Appar hymns in a book titled Hymns of the Tamil Śaivite Saints, released by the Oxford University Press. They stated that these were some of the hymns from Devaram (Tevaram) that they could hear being chanted in South Indian Shiva temples of their times.

More recent English translations of many more select hymns by Sundarar have been published by Indira Peterson, and David Shulman.

=== Temple traditions ===
Sundarar's pilgrimage to Shiva temples and his efforts helped expand the Shaiva sacred geography in Tamil Nadu. Like Sambandar and Appar, Sundarar's hymns have been helpful in identifying and dating many of the old Shiva temples found in Tamil Nadu. These have been helpful to art historians, and for architectural, archaeological and religious studies.

List of temples associated with Sundarar

Name of the temple	Location	Number of verses	Photo
Agatheeswarar Temple	Purisai	63	
Kripapureeswarar Temple	Thiruvennainallur	10	
Parangirinathar Temple	Tirupparankunram	10	
Turaiyurppesurar Temple	Thirunelvayil Arathurai	10	
Mahadeva Temple	Thiruvanchikulam, Kerala	10	
Thiruonakathan Thali	Kanchipuram	11	
Swetharanyeswarar Temple	Thiruvenkadu	10	
Thiruethikolpadi Temple	Thiruethikolpadi	11	
Thyagarajar Temple	Tiruvarur	63	
Swarnapuresar Temple	Trikaduvaikarai Putur	11	
Thiruanegathangavatham	Kanchipuram	11	
Thirupoovanam	Thirupoovanam	8	
Thirunatuthogai	Thirunatuthogai	11	
Thiruthuraiyur	Thiruthuraiyur	11	
Thirupachilasiramam	Thirupachilasiramam	12	
Thirunatiyathangudi	Thirunatiyathangudi	10	
Amirdhakalayeswarar Temple	Saakkottai	11	
Tirunaavaleswarar Temple	Thirunavalur	11	
Thiruvelvikudi Temple	Thiruvelvikudi	10	
Thirunindriyur Temple	Thirunindriyur	18	
Kolilinathar Temple	Thirukkuvalai	10	
Metraleeswar Temple	Kanchipuram	10	
Thirumazhamannipadikarai	Thirumazhamannipadikarai	10	
Thirukazhipalai	Thirukazhipalai	10	
Vajranadeswara Temple	Thirumazhapadi	10	
Thirumuthukundram	Thirumuthukundram	21	
Srikalahasti Temple	Srikalahasti	10	
Uyyakondan Thirumalai Temple	Tiruchirapalli	10	
Amirtagateswarar Temple	Thirukkadaiyur	10	
Thirukarugavoor	Thirukarugavoor	10	
Thirukarupariyaloor	Thirukarupariyaloor	11	
Thiruidaiyatruthogai	Thiruidaiyatruthogai	10	
Thirukodikuzhagar	Kodikkarai	10	
Agnipureeswarar Temple	Tirupugalur	11	
Sakshinatheswarar Temple	Thiruppurambiyam	10	
Neelivaneswarar Temple	Thirupanjeeli	11	
Thiruvathigai Veeratanam	Thiruvatigai	10	
Thiruthondathogai	Thiruthondathogai	11	
Thirukanatumullur	Thirukanatumullur	11	
Thirukachoor	Thirukachoor	10	
VenjamakoodalThiruvenjamakoodal	Thiruvenjamakoodal	10	
Muthupathugangai	Muthupathugangai	10	
Thiruamathur	Thiruamathur	11	
Kayarohanaswami Temple	Nagapattinam	11	
Oorthogai	Oorthogai	10	
Thirupandikodumudi	Thirupandikodumudi	10	
Thirumuruganatheeswar Temple	Thirumuruganpoondi	10	
Thiruppunavasal Temple	Thiruppunavasal	10	
Thiruvalangadu	Thirvalangadu	10	
Thirukadaiyur Mayanam	Thirukkadaiyur	10	
Thyagaraja Temple	Tiruvottiyur	20	
Sivalokanathar Temple	Thirupungur	10	
Thiruneedur	Thiruneedur	11	
Thiruvazhkolliputhur	Thiruvazhkolliputhur	13	
Thirukazhumalam	Thirukazhumalam	10	
Mahalingeswarar Temple	Thiruvidaimarudur	10	
Thiruvegambam	Thiruvegambam	11	
Thirukolakka	Thirukolakka	10	
Thiruthinainagar	Thiruthinainagar	10	
Masilamaiyisar Temple	Thiruvaduthurai	15	
Thiruvalivalam	Thiruvalivalam	11	
Tirunallar Saniswaran Temple	Tirunallar	10	
Masilamaniswara Temple	Thirumullaivoyal	11	
Vedaranyeswarar Temple	Vedaranyam	10	
Thiruvalampuram	Thiruvalampuram	11	
Thiruthuruthi	Thiruthuruthi	5	
Thiruvelvikudi	Thiruvelvikudi	5	
Jambukeswarar Temple	Thiruvanaikaval	10	
Vanchinadha Swamy Temple	Srivanchiyam	10	
Aiyarappar temple	Tiruvaiyaru	11	
Kedarnath Temple	Kedarnath	10	
Thiruparupatham	Thiruparupatham	10	
Thiruketheeswaram	Thiruketheeswaram	10	
Vedagiriswarar temple	Thirukazhukundram	10	
Thiruchuzial		10	
Thirukanapper		10	
Narthana Vallabeswarar temple	Thirukoodalaiyathur	10	
Thiruparthaanpanankattur		10	
Soundareswararswamy Temple	Thirupanaiyur	10	
Veezhinathar Temple	Thiruveezhimizhalai	10	
Thiruvenpakkam		11	
Thillai Nataraja Temple	Chidambaram	10	
Thirupukoliyur Avinasi	Avinasilingeswarar temple, Avinasi	10	
Sundareswarar Temple	Thirunaraiyur Chitteswaram	10	
Odhanavaneswarar Temple	Tiruchotruturai		10
Thyagarajar Paravaiyundamandali Temple	Tiruvarur	10	
Thirunanipalli		10	
Prakasheswarar Temple	Nannilam	11	
Naganatha Swamy Temple	Tirunageswaram	11	
Thirunodithan Malai			
Tiruvadhigai Veerataanam Temple	Tiruvadhigai		
Manikkamenivaradhar Temple	Thirumaandakuzhi		
Brahmapuresar Temple	Sirkali		
Saptapreswarar Temple	Tirukolaka		
Sivaloganathar Temple	Tirupungur		
Mayuranathar Temple	Mayiladuthurai		
Tiruvambar Maakaalam Temple	Tiruvambar (Ambal)		
Agnipuriswarar Temple	Tirupugalur		
Karinateswarar Temple	Tirunatiyathankudi		
Manatunainatar temple	Tiruvalivalam		
Padikasu Nathar Temple	Arisirkarai Putur		
Sivagurunathaswamy Temple	Sivapuram		
Adi Kumbeswarar Temple	Kumbakonam		
Kabardeeshwarar Temple	Thiruvalanchuzhi		
Kalyanasundaresar Temple	Tirunallur		
Virataneswarar Temple	Tirukkandiyur		
Pushpavananadheswarar Temple	Tirupundhuruti		
Atmanadeswarar Temple	Tiruvalamposil		
