= Shivpuri (disambiguation) =

Shivpuri is a city seat of Shivpuri district in Madhya Pradesh, India.

Shivpuri may also refer to:

== Places ==
- Shivpuri district, in Madhya Pradesh, India
  - Shivpuri (Lok Sabha constituency)
  - Shivpuri (Vidhan Sabha constituency)
  - Shivuri National Park, another name for Madhav National Park
- Varanasi or Kashi, holy city in India, known as Shivpuri (the city of [puri] + Shiva)
- Shivpuri, Lucknow, a village in Uttar Pradesh, India
- Shivpuri, Patna, a neighborhood of Patna, India
- Shivpuri colony, a residential development in Lucknow, Uttar Pradesh, India

== People ==
- Himani Shivpuri (born 1960), Indian actress
- Malavika Shivpuri, Indian voice and film actress
- Om Shivpuri (died 1990), Indian actor
- Ritu Shivpuri (born 1975), Indian film actress and model, daughter of Om and Sudha
- Sudha Shivpuri (1937–2015), Indian actress, wife of Om

== Other ==
- R v Shivpuri, a House of Lords case in English law

== See also ==
- Shivpur (disambiguation)
