= Shibpur (disambiguation) =

Shibpur may refer to:

- Shibpur area of Howrah city in West Bengal, India
  - Shibpur (Vidhan Sabha constituency), a West Bengal Legislative Assembly constituency
- Sibpur, Paschim Bardhaman, a village in West Bengal, India
- Shibpur (Andaman), a village in Diglipur Tehsil of Andaman & Nicobar islands, India
- Shibpur Upazila of Narsingdi District, Bangladesh

== See also ==
- Shivpur (disambiguation)
