= Ona Kantheeswarar Temple =

Hindu temple in Tamil Nadu, India

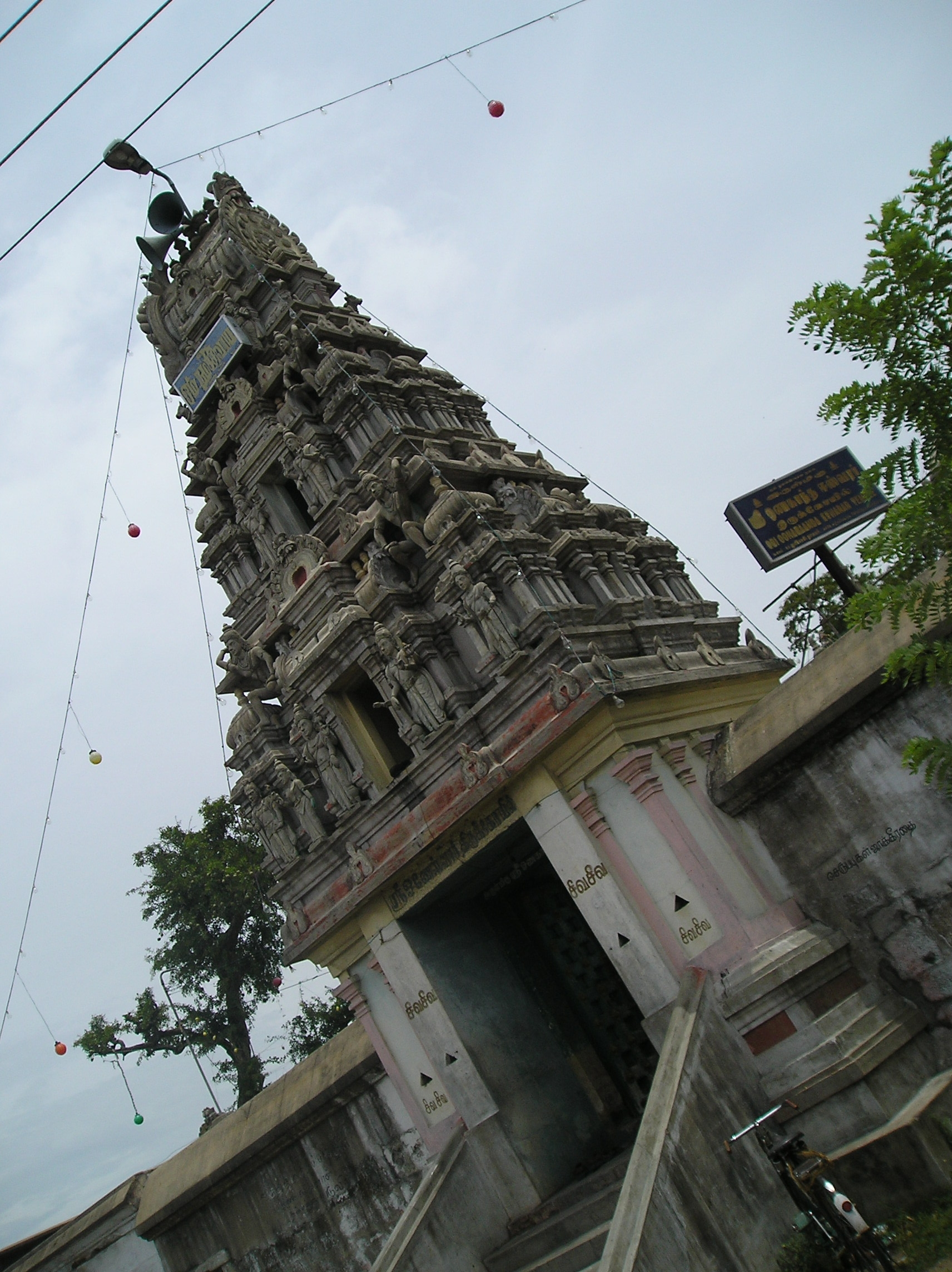
- Image of the Onakanthan temple gopuram

- Location in Tamil Nadu

Religion
- Affiliation: Hinduism
- District: Kanchipuram
- Deity: Ona Kantheeswarar(Shiva) Kamakshi(Parvathi)

Location
- Location: Kanchipuram
- State: Tamil Nadu
- Country: India
- Coordinates: 12°51′02″N 79°41′39″E

Architecture
- Type: Dravidian architecture

Ona Kantheeswarar Temple (also called Onakanthali) is a Hindu temple dedicated to Shiva, located in the town of Panjupettai, Kanchipuram, Kanchipuram district in Tamil Nadu, India. Shiva is worshipped as Ona Kantheeswarar and his consort Parvathi as Kamakshi. Ona Kantheeswarar is revered in the 7th-century CE Tamil Saiva canonical work, the Tevaram, written by Tamil saint poets known as the nayanars and classified as Paadal Petra Sthalam, the 275 temples revered in the canon.

The temple has a small three-tiered rajagopuram, the entrance tower and all the shrines are located in an elevated structure. The temple is maintained and administered by the Hindu Religious and Endowment Board of the Government of Tamil Nadu.

== Etymology and legend ==
As per Hindu legend, the temple was believed to have been built by two asuras (demons) named Onan and Kanthan. The asuras got a lingam (an iconic representation of Shiva) from a forest in the region and became ardent devotees. On account of their devotion, they got all the desired boons. There was a third asura, Jalandeeswaran, who joined the two, and became an ardent devotee of Shiva. The three shrines in the temple, each dedicated to Onakantheeswarar, Salantheeswarar and Jalandeeswarar are believed to be the respective shrines built by the demons.

Sundarar, a 7th-century Tamil Saivite poet, venerated Ona Kantheeswarar in one verse in Tevaram, compiled as the Seventh Tirumurai. As the temple is revered in Tevaram, it is classified as Paadal Petra Sthalam, one of the 275 temples that find mention in the Saiva canon. It is believed that he got back one of his eyes which he lost on account of not keeping his word in the Ekambanathar Temple. To test his devotion, Shiva moved toward a tamarind tree and Sundarar followed his footsteps and sung praises of Shiva. His devotion was admired and Shiva turned the tamarind leaves to golden leaves and poured on him from the skies.

== Architecture ==
The temple is located 1 km (0.62 mi) south-west of Ekambareswarar Temple in Kanchipuram in a locality called Panjupettai. Ona Kantheeswarar temple complex has a single prakarams (outer courtyard) covering an area of 80 m^{2} (860 sq ft) and a small three-tiered rajagopuram (gateway tower) facing East. The central shrine faces east and holds the two image of Ona Kantheeswarar (Shiva) in the form of lingam made of granite and is believed to be a swayambumoorthy (self manifested). There are two other shrines of Shiva namely Salantheeswarar and Jalandeeswarar. As in other temples in Kanchipuram, there is no separate shrine of Parvathi as it is believed that Kamakshi of Kanchipuram is the common Parvathi shrine for all Shiva temples. There is a separate shrine for Vinayagar called Vaiyurunthi Pillayar. The granite images of Nandi (the bull and vehicle of Shiva), a tall flag staff and a Balipeeta, the place of offering, axial to the sanctum. As in other Shiva temples of Tamil Nadu, the first precinct or the walls around the sanctum of Ona Kantheeswarar has images of Dakshinamurthy (Shiva as the Teacher), Durga (warrior-goddess) and Chandikeswarar (a saint and devotee of Shiva). The temple precinct is surrounded by granite walls.

== Gallery ==
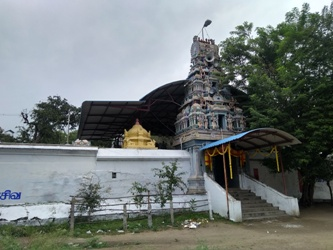
Main Entrance with rajagopura

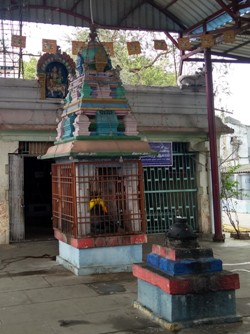
Ona Kantheeswarar shrine

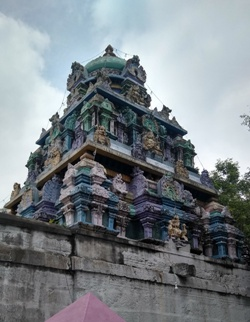
Ona Kantheeswarar vimana

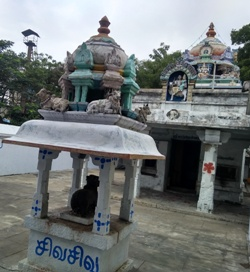
Kantheeswarar shrine

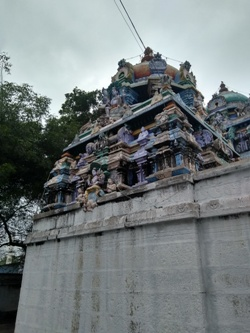
Kantheeswarar vimana

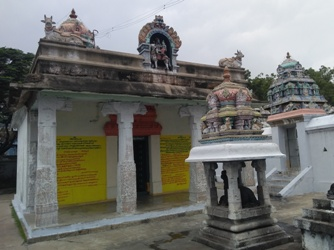
Salantheeswarar shrine

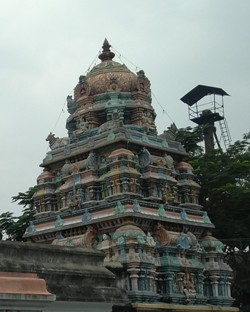
Salantheeswarar vimana
