= Sivagurunathaswamy Temple =

Sivagurunatha Swamy Temple
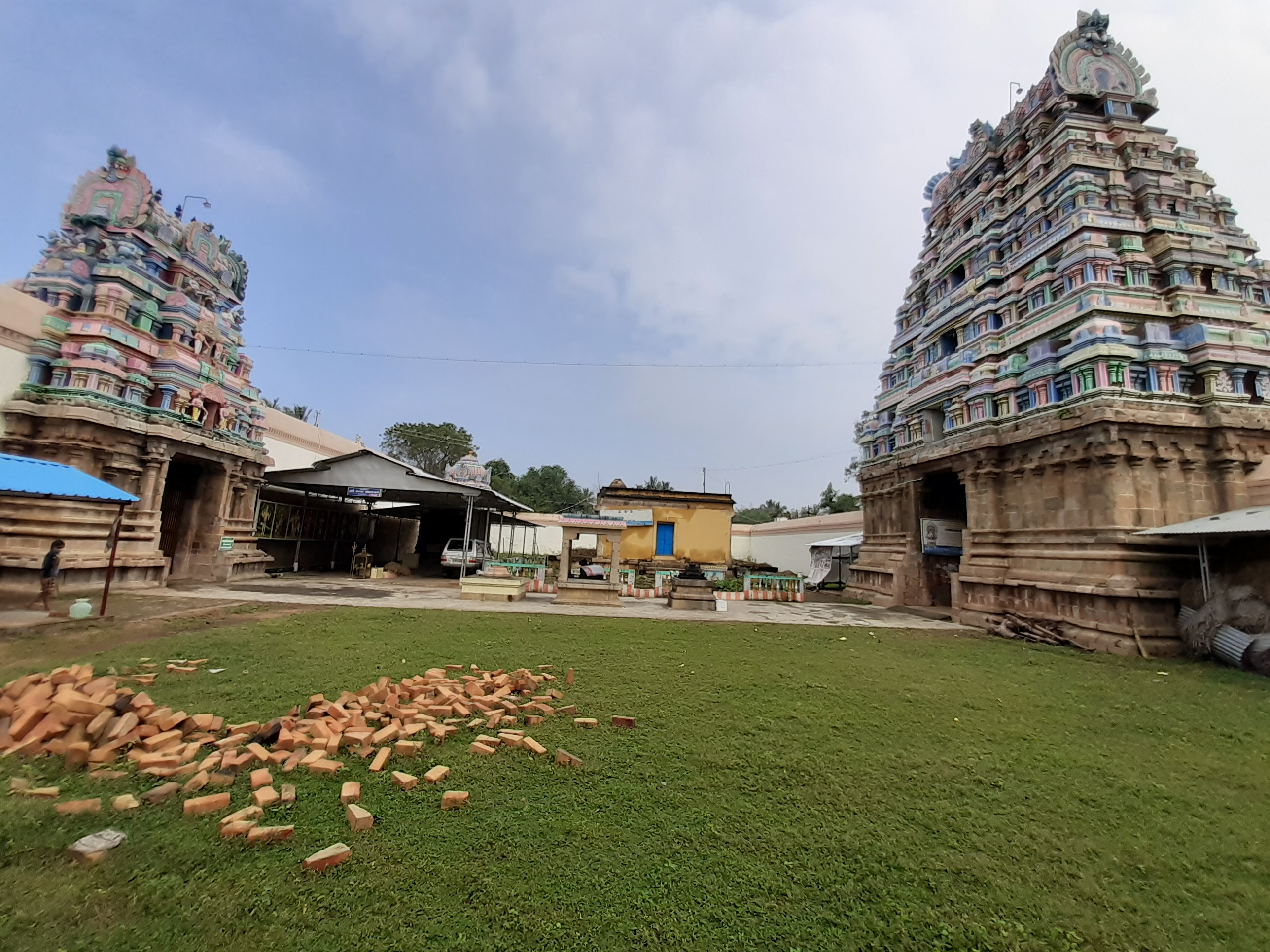

- Location in Tamil Nadu

Religion
- Affiliation: Hinduism
- District: Tanjore
- Deity: Sivagurunathar (Shiva)

Location
- Location: Sivapuram, Kumbakonam
- State: Tamil Nadu
- Country: India
- Coordinates: 10°56′N 79°25′E

Architecture
- Type: Dravidian architecture

Sivagurunathaswamy temple is a Hindu temple dedicated to Shiva in the village of Aduthurai, Tamil Nadu, India. Shiva is worshipped as Sivagurunathaswamy, and is represented by the lingam. His consort Parvati is depicted as Prabhavalli. The presiding deity is mentioned in the 7th century Tamil Saiva canonical work, the Tevaram, written by Tamil saint poets known as the nayanars and classified as Paadal Petra Sthalam.

It houses two gateway towers known as gopurams. The tallest is the eastern tower, with five stories and a height of 72 feet (22 m). The image of Nataraja, a prominent and ancient Chola art, was stolen and brought back from overseas after an elongated legal battle.

The temple was originally built by the Cholas and has many inscriptions from them. The masonry structure was built during the Nayak during the 16th century. In modern times, the temple is maintained and administered by the Hindu Religious and Endowment Board of the Government of Tamil Nadu.

== Legend ==
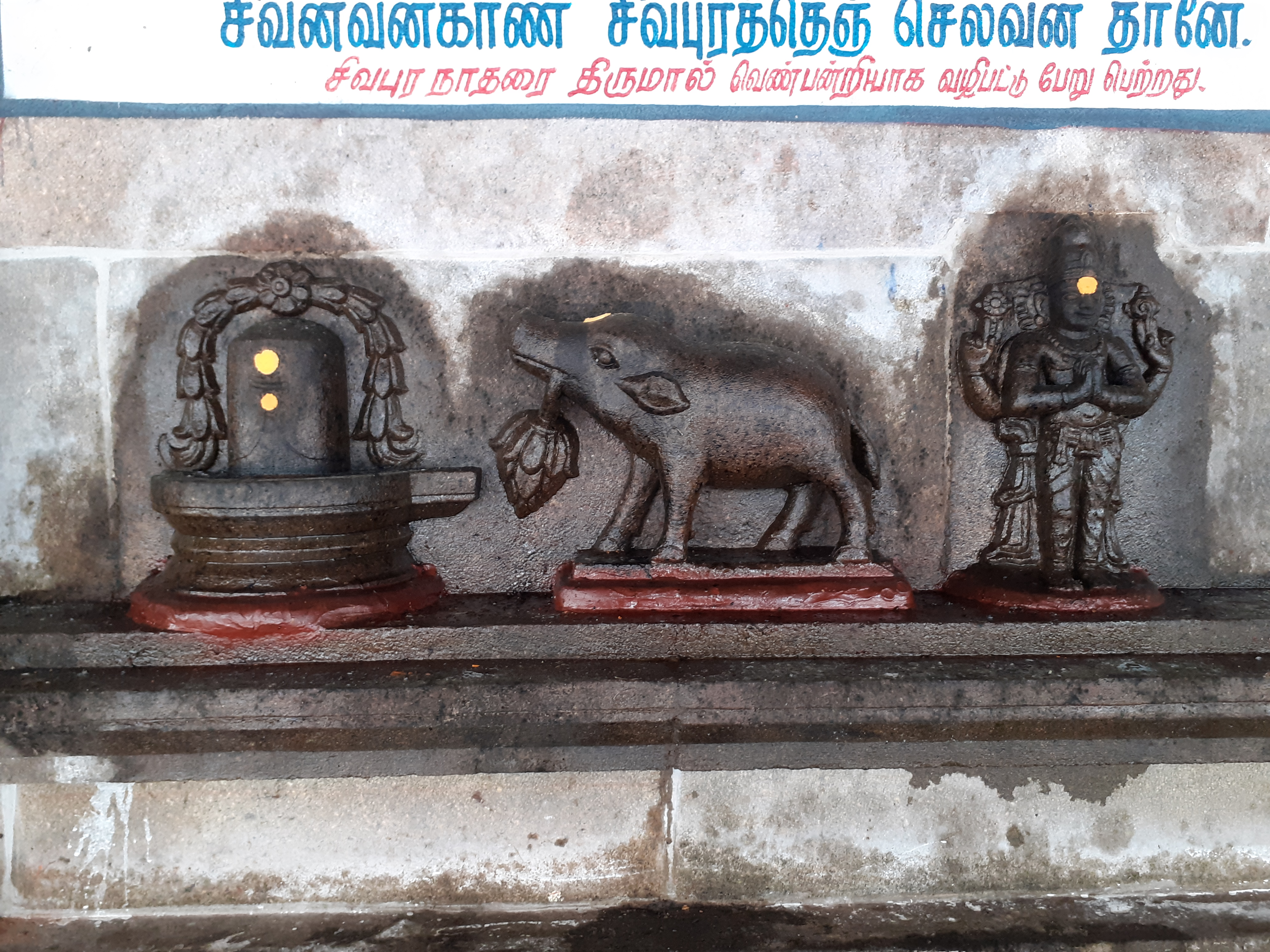
Sculpture indicating the legend

As per Hindu legend, the Sun god Surya and moon god Chandra worshipped the presiding deity in the place. Brahma worshipped Shiva in the place and attained his power of creation. Vishnu is believed to have appeared in the form of a boar to worship Shiva. Sambandar, a saivite saint, is believed to have performed Angapradakshanam (cicumabulating using ones body) as he believed that the image of Shiva resided beneath the floor and he should not touch the image with his foot. Following the legend, the temple is one of the few Shiva temples where Angapradakshanam is performed, which is otherwise performed only in Vishnu temples.

As per another legend, Ravana, an asura king, worshipped Shiva in an unclean manner. Kubera, the brother of Ravana, worshipped Shiva to forgive the behaviour. He was chided by Shiva's bull Nandi and was cursed to born in earth as a normal human. Kubera was born in this place as a knight and he started worshipping Shiva. Pleased by his devotion, his position was restored. As Kubera is believed to have worshipped here, the village is also known as Kuberapuri.

== Architecture ==
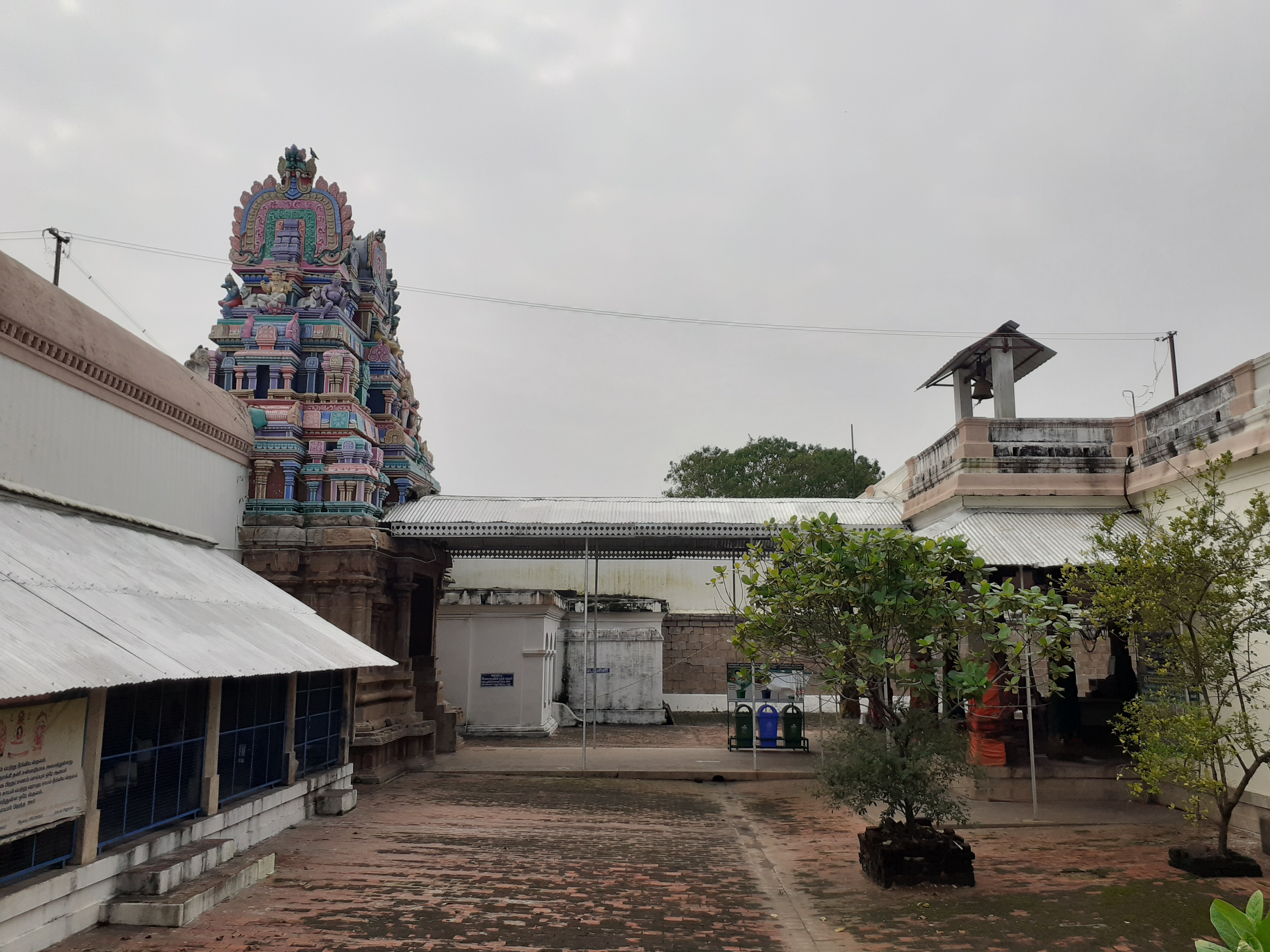
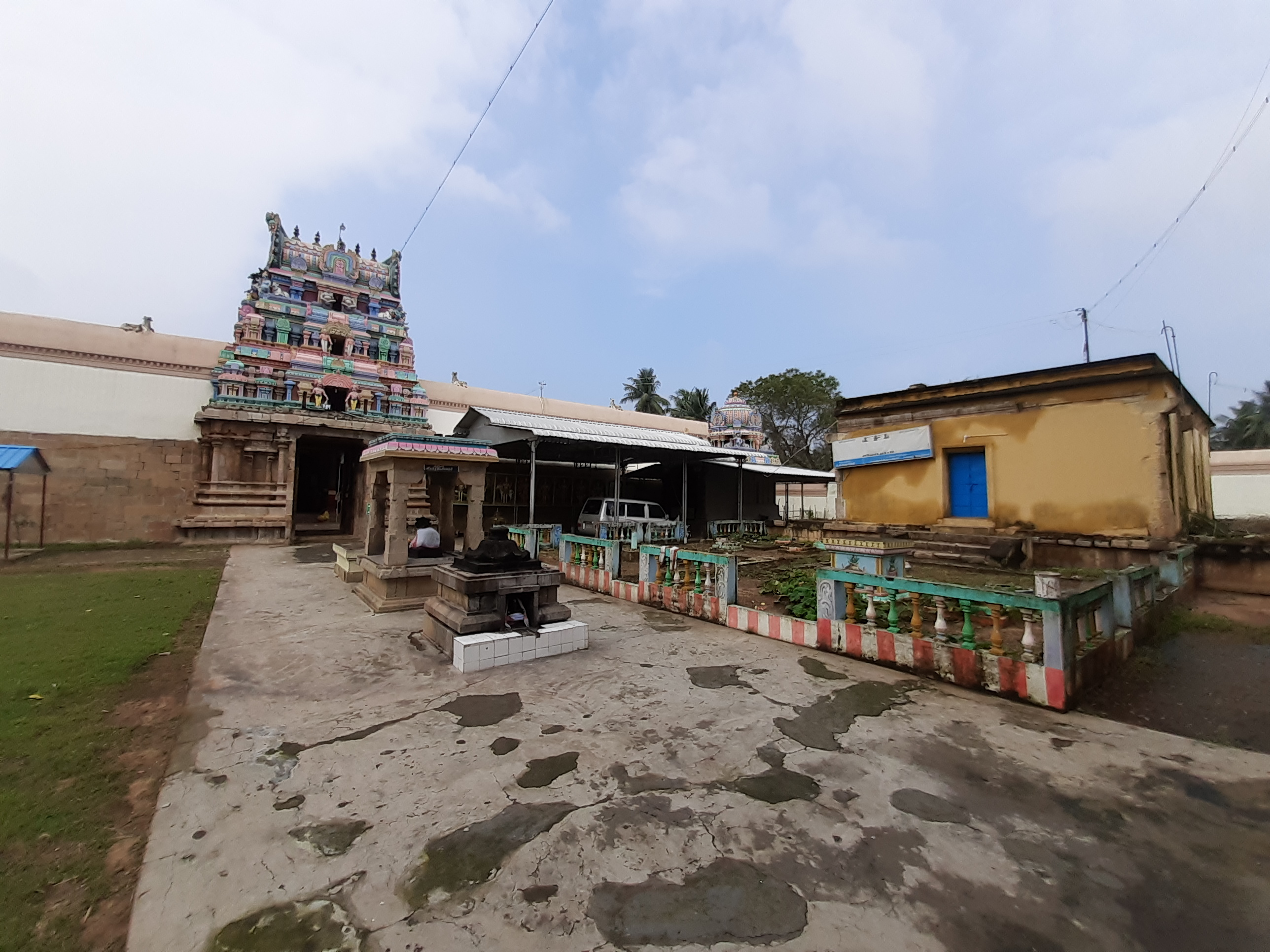
Shrines within the temple

Sivapuram is located 5 kilometres south-east of the town and taluk headquarters of Kumbakonam on the way to Thiruvarur. Sivapuram is famous for the Sivagurunathaswamy temple dedicated to the Hindu god Shiva. The deity is also referred to as Sivagurunathar or Sivapuranathar. The temple is one of the 67 sthalams or holy abodes mentioned in the Thevaram located in the ancient Chola kingdom. According to different legends, Vishnu, Brahma and Kubera had worshipped Shiva here at different times.

The present temple in the village dates back to the Later Chola period and covers an area of 1.3 acres (5,300 m^{2}). The principal shrine is dedicated to Shiva who is worshipped by a sculpted figurine of Vishnu in his Varaha Avatar. There are also shrines dedicated to Subrahmanya, Gajalakshmi and Bhairava.

It is also believed that a shivalingam lies buried at this spot. This shivalingam was worshipped by the Saivite saint Tirugnanasambandar and the spot where he worshipped is called Swamigal Thurai.

== Idol theft ==
In 1951, idols of Nataraja, Tirugnanasambandar, Somaskandar, Pillaiyar and two other goddesses from the Later Chola period were recovered by a farmer Annamuthu Padaiyachi in Kuppuswamy Iyer's field. The farmer alerted government authorities about his find and handed the idols to the authorities. On 10 October 1953, the District Collector of Thanjavur donated the idols to the Sivagurunathasamy temple to be installed along with other deities. On receipt of the idols, the temple authorities commissioned sculptor Ramasamy Sthapathi to repair the idols. The idols were subsequently returned to the temple after the repairs had been carried out.

Some time later, Dr. Douglas Barrett of the British Museum, who had visited the temple in 1961, wrote in his book South Indian Bronze that the Nataraja idol in the Sivagurunathaswamy temple was fake and that the original idols were in the possession of a private art collector in the United States of America. This claim prompted the Government of Tamil Nadu to send S. Krishnaraj, Deputy Inspector General, CID, to the US to investigate the claim. As the outcome of Krishnaraj's investigations, a case was registered at the Nachiyar Koil police station.

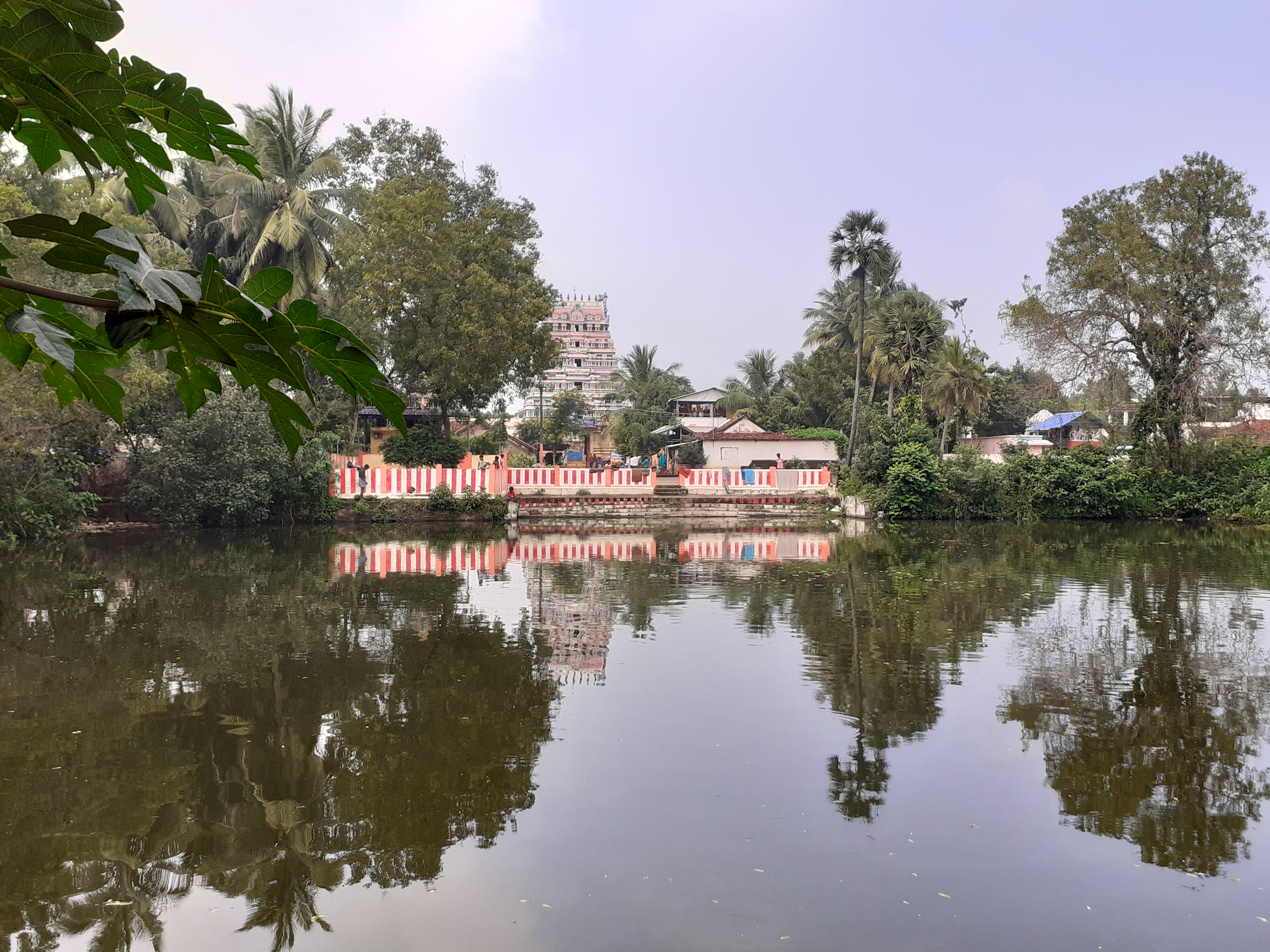
Temple tank located in front of the temple

The case was entrusted to the Crime Branch CID and investigations were carried out with the assistance of the Scotland Yard. It was found that in 1956, one Thilakar of Kuthalam and his brother Doss had persuaded Ramasamy Sthapathi to lend the six idols to them in return for six fake ones which Ramasamy had returned to the temple authorities. The idols were purchased by a private art collector Lance Dane of Bombay who kept the idols in his possession for a decade before selling them to Bomman Beharan. The idols eventually made their way to the United States where in 1973 they were purchased by Norton Simon Foundation for $900,000.

The Indian police arrested Lance Dane, Thilakar, Doss and Ramasamy Sthapathy. Meanwhile, the Scotland Yard found out that the actual Nataraja idol was in the possession of Anna Plowden of England. The Government of India filed a civil suit against the Norton Simon Foundation. The Tamil Nadu government approached the Government of the United States of America through India's Ministry of External Affairs. The Nataraja idol was handed over to Dr. M. S. Nagaraja Rao, the Director-General of the Archaeological Survey of India in 1987 and is currently present in a safe-vault in the Kapaleeswara temple, Mylapore, Chennai.

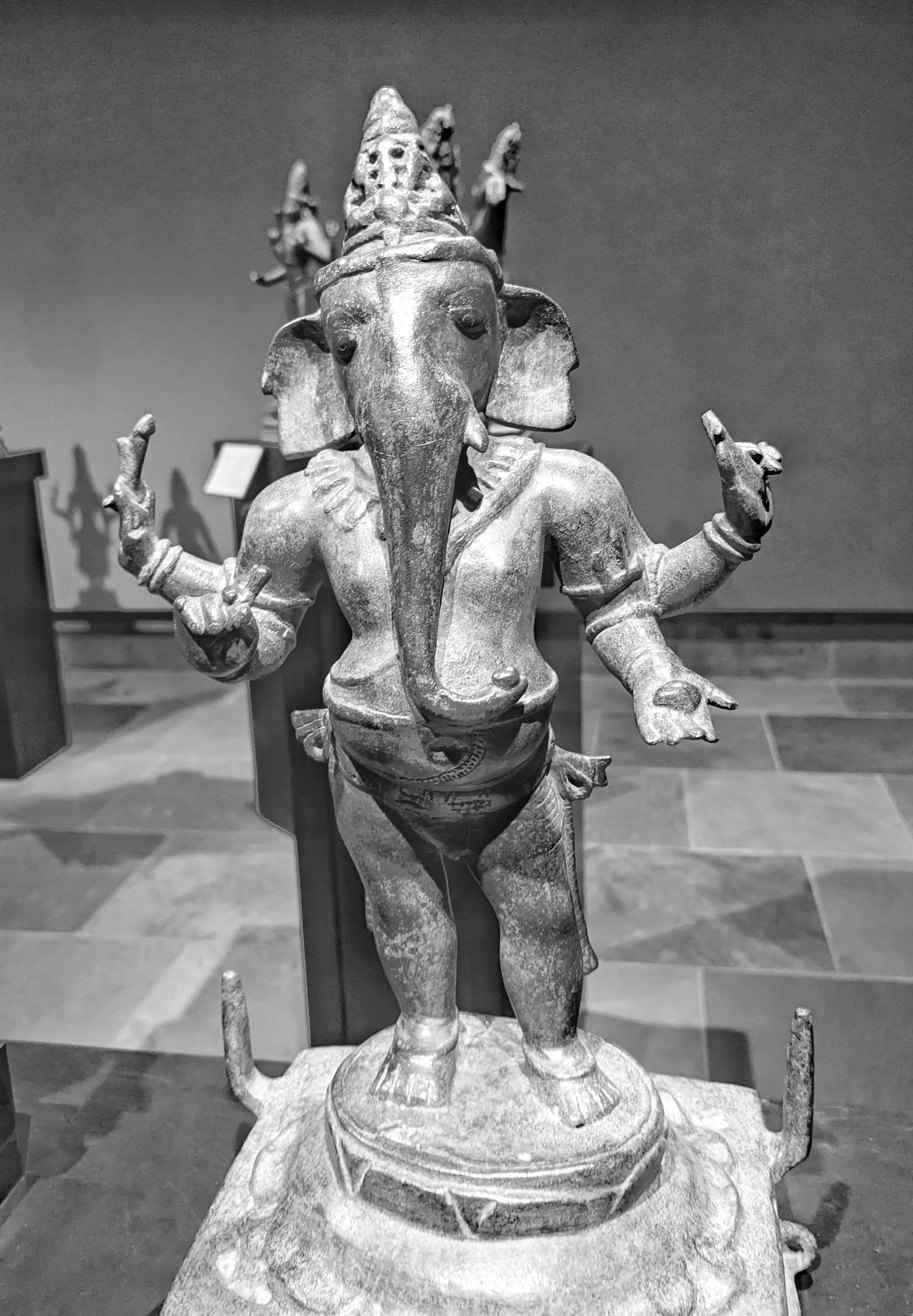
Ganesha (Norton Simon)

S.No.	Deity	Stolen Idol traced to	Country	Current status	More Details
1	Nataraja	Norton Simon Museum	United States	Recovered	In safe-vault of Kapaleeswarar Temple, Chennai
2	Somaskanda	Norton Simon Museum	United States	Unknown	
3	Standing Sambandar	Norton Simon Museum	United States	Unknown	
4	Ganesha	Norton Simon Museum	United States	Unknown	
5	Parvati (Sivagami Amman/Thani Amman)	Denver Art Museum	United States	Unknown	
6	Parvati (Gowri Amman)			Unknown	
