= Narthana Vallabeswarar temple =

Narthana Vallabeswarar Temple
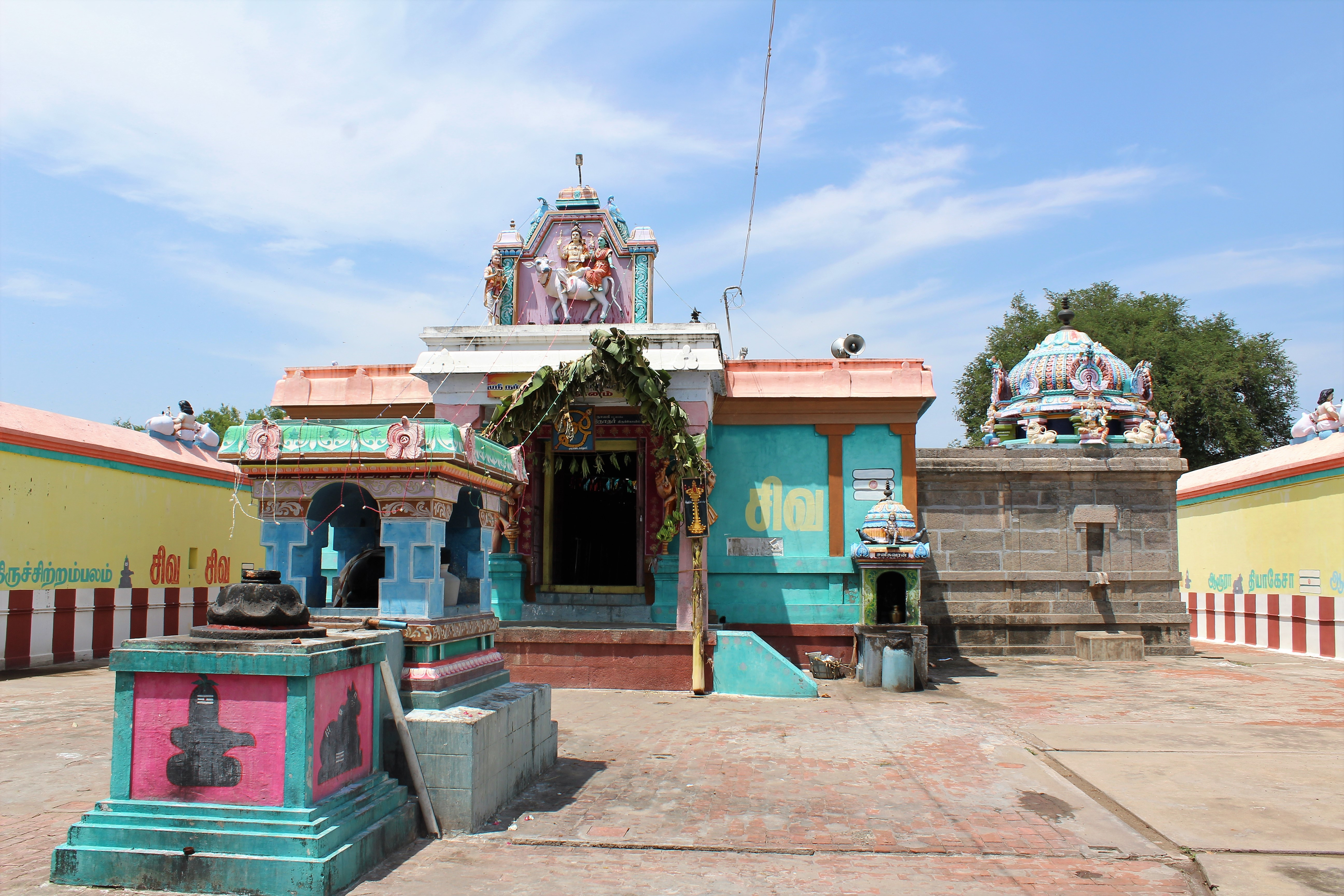

- Location in Tamil Nadu

Religion
- Affiliation: Hinduism
- District: Cuddalore
- Deity: Narthana Vallabeswarar(Shiva)

Location
- State: Tamil Nadu
- Country: India
- Coordinates: 11°24′57″N 79°28′38″E

Architecture
- Type: Dravidian architecture

Narthana Vallabeswarar Temple is a Hindu temple dedicated to the deity Shiva, located in Thirukoodalaiyathoor, a village in Cuddalore district in the South Indian state of Tamil Nadu. Shiva is worshipped as Narthana Vallabeswarar, and is represented by the lingam. His consort Parvati is depicted as Gnanasakthi and Parasakthi. The presiding deity is revered in the seventh-century Tamil Saiva canonical work, the Tevaram, written by Tamil saint poets known as the Nayanars and classified as Paadal Petra Sthalam.

The temple complex covers around half acre and entered through a three tiered gopuram, the main gateway. The temple has a number of shrines, with those of Narthana Vallabeswarar and his consorts Gnanasakthi and Parasakthi being the most prominent. All the shrines of the temple are enclosed in large concentric rectangular granite walls.

== Legend ==
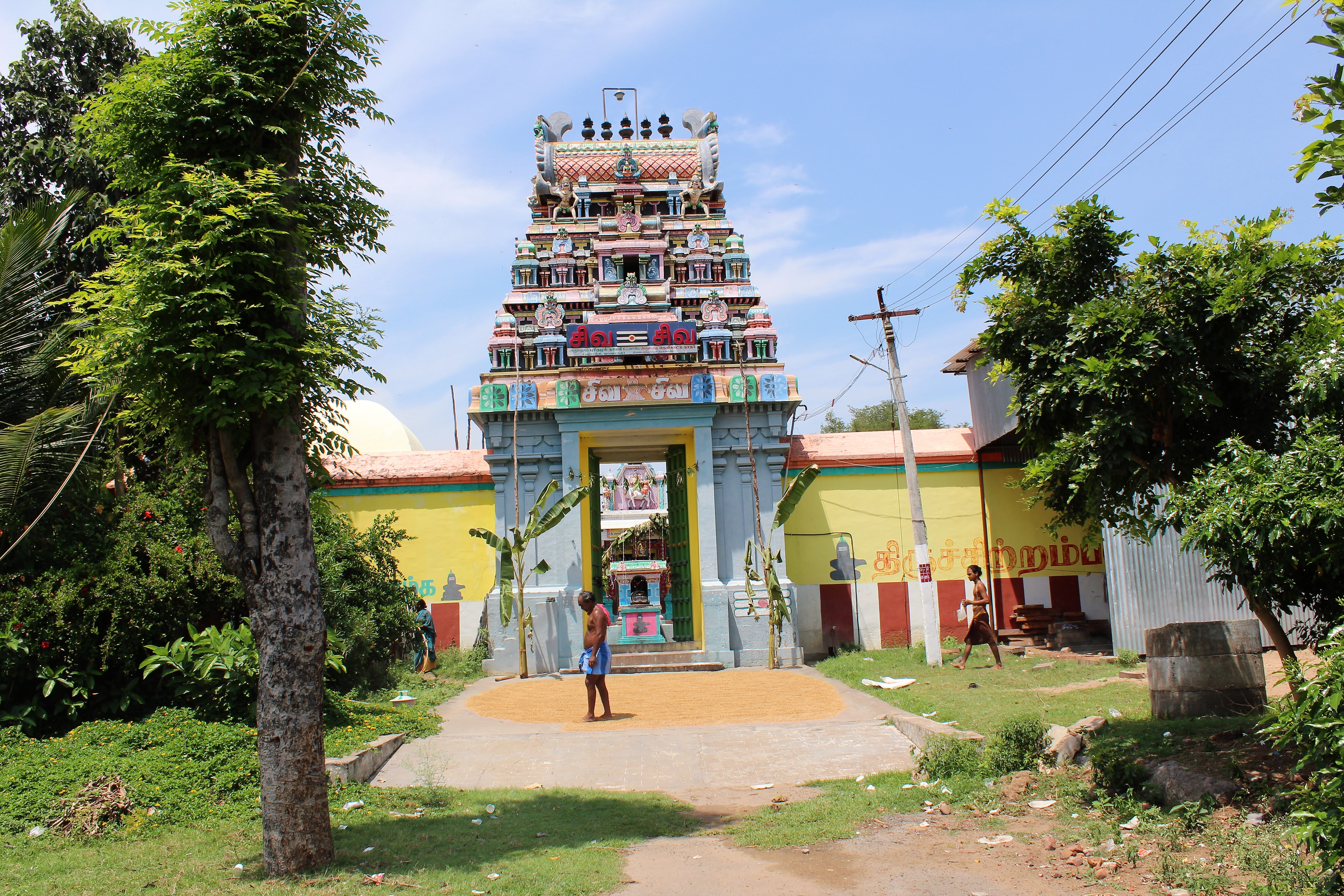
The gopuram of the temple

As per Hindu legend, sage Agastya had a son named Karthyanan who was also a great sage. Agastya prayed Shiva to attain a girl child. On account of divine grace, he found a child floating on a lotus leaf in Manimutharu river. He named her Ambujavailli brought up the child. It is believed that Vishnu's consort Lakshmi was born as Ambujavalli and married Vishnu during his Varaha avatar. As per another legend, a Chola king who ruled the region suspected his wife and killed her. He attained Brahmahatti Dosha for the wrongdoing. He sustained skin disease and also began to wander like a lunatic. On arriving at the confluence of this place where rivers Manimutharu and Vellaru flow, he saw a dog with disease attaining relief after taking a dip in the river. The king followed the dog and attained relief. Shiva came to be known as Koodalaiyitroorar as he is believed to rule the place (koodal means 'confluence' in Tamil).

== Architecture ==
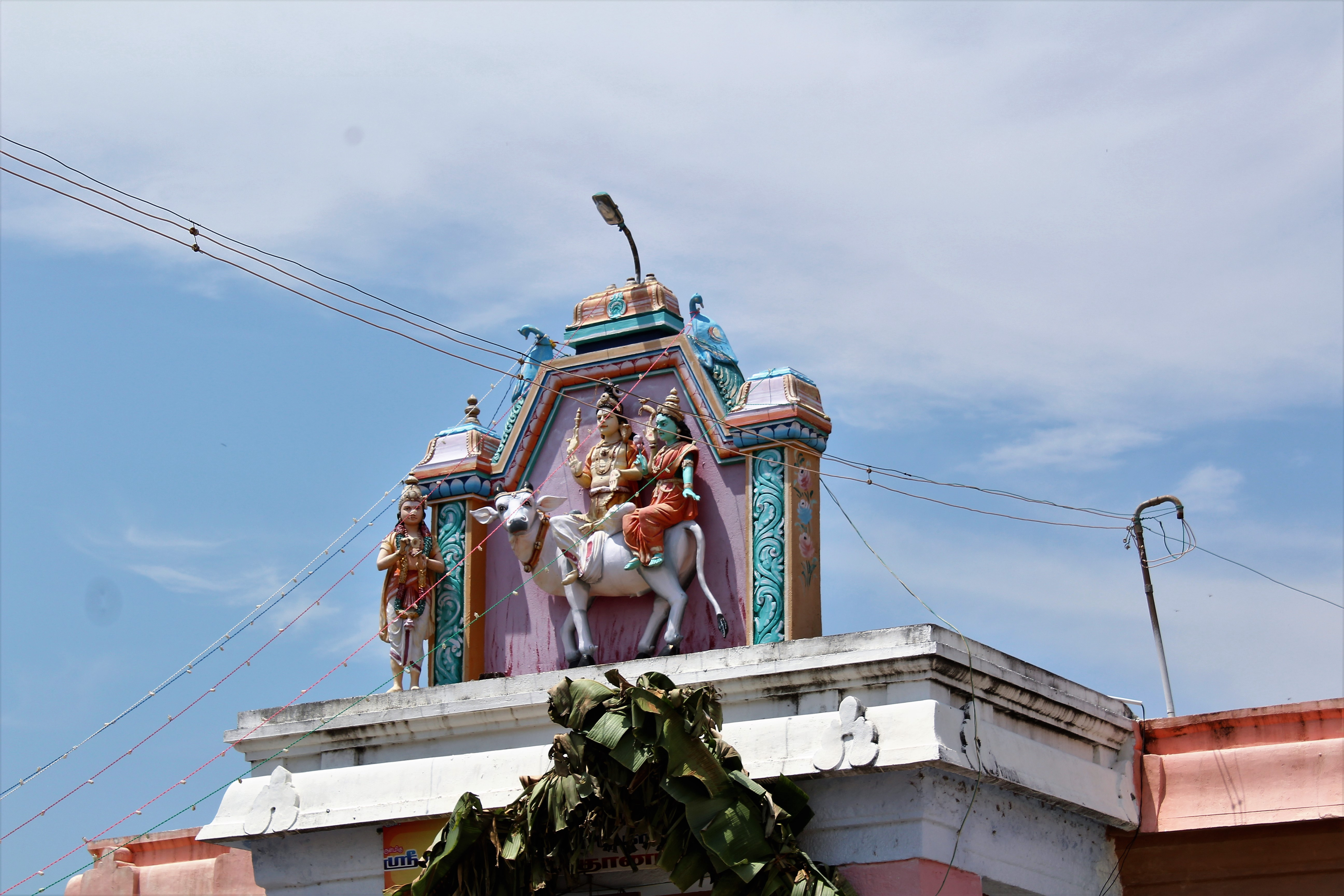
A stucco image indicating the legend of Sundarar worhsiping Shiva

The temple has a three-tiered gateway tower and all the shrines of the temple are enclosed in concentric rectangular granite walls. The temple occupies an area of around 0.5 acres (0.20 ha). The central shrine houses the image of Narthana Vallabeswarar in the form of Lingam. The shrine of Ishta sakthi and Parasakthi, the consorts of Shiva, facing West is located in the Mahamandapam leading to the sanctum. The central shrine is approached through the flagstaff and Mahamandapam, both which are located axial to the gateway. As in other Shiva temples in Tamil Nadu, the shrines of Vinayaka, Murugan, Navagraha, Chandikesa and Durga are located around the precinct of the main shrine. There is a shrine of Chitragupta, the accountant of Yama located in the temple. Unlike other temples, there is no separate shrine for Navagraha, the nine planetary deities. The panels of the walls around the sanctum houses the Koshta images like Dakshinamurthy, Lingodbhava, Brahma and Ashtabhuja Durga. The shrine of Nataraja houses the metal image of Nataraja while there is a festival image of Chitragupta holding pen in one hand and script in the other.

The original complex is believed to have been built by Cholas, while the present masonry structure was built during the Nayak during the 16th century. In modern times, the temple is maintained and administered by the Hindu Religious and Charitable Endowments Department of the Government of Tamil Nadu.

== Religious importance ==
It is one of the shrines of the 275 Paadal Petra Sthalams – Shiva Sthalams glorified in the early medieval Tevaram poems by Tamil Saivite Nayanars Sundarar. As per Hindu legend, Sundarar, while traveling to Vriddhagiriswarar Temple, Vriddhachalam forgot this place and asked about the way to the Vridhagiriswarar temple to a saint who was going in front of him. The saint directed him to the Koddalaiytrur temple. Sundarar on reaching the temple realised that the saint was none other than Shiva himself. Sundarar has made a mention of the event, calling the deity as Narthana Vallabeswarar. The presiding deity is also called Narthana Vallabeswarar as he is believed to have danced in front of Brahma on his request.
