= St Thomas College of Engineering and Technology =

Undergraduate college in Kerala, India

St. Thomas College of Engineering and Technology
- Other name: STM
- Type: Educational institution, Engineering College
- Established: 2014; 12 years ago
- Accreditation: NAAC, NBA, UGC
- Affiliations: APJ Abdul Kalam Technological University
- Chairman: Jose Thomas
- Principal: Shinu Mathew John
- Undergraduates: CSE ,CIVIL, ECE, ME
- Location: Shivapuram, Mattannur, Kannur, Kerala, 670702, India; 11°54′56.6″N 75°37′30.5″E
- Campus: 10.05 acres (40,700 m^{2})
- Sporting affiliations: AICTE id :1-2184018161
- Website: stthomaskannur.ac.in
- Location within Kerala Location within India

St. Thomas College of Engineering and Technology (STM) is an undergraduate college in Kannur district of Kerala, India. It is affiliated to APJ Abdul Kalam Technological University and established by St Thomas Educational Society, Adoor in the year 2014. It is accredited by the All India Council for Technical Education.

The Courses offered at B.Tech level are Mechanical Engineering, Electronics & Communication Engineering, Computer Science & Engineering, and Civil Engineering. The duration of course for B.Tech is four academic years and eight semesters as prescribed in the curriculum. University examinations will be conducted at the end of the each semester.

== Overview ==
The college was established in the interior of Malabar to cater for the needs of engineering education in the northeastern part of the Malabar area, otherwise deprived of higher education in their area. Yet the college is open to all distinguished students from all over Kerala to benefit from advanced and educated engineering education.

This college is part of the IEDC program of the government of Kerala and is also known for its contribution to innovative start-up activities.

Admissions to the college is based on the Common Entrance Examination (CEE) conducted by the Govt. of Kerala every year.

== Department ==
=== Engineering ===
- Mechanical Engineering
- Computer Science & Engineering
- Computer Science & Engineering with Data Science
- Civil Engineering
- Electronics & Communication Engineering

=== Non-Engineering Department ===
- Applied Science & Humanities

== Courses ==
The STM offers B.Tech Degree in Engineering in four subjects:

- Civil Engineering
- Computer Science & Engineering
- Electronics & Communication Engineering
- Mechanical Engineering
