= Kalyanasundareswarar Temple, Thiruvelvikudi =

Shiva temple in Tamil Nadu, India

Coordinates: 11.086791°N 79.568868°E

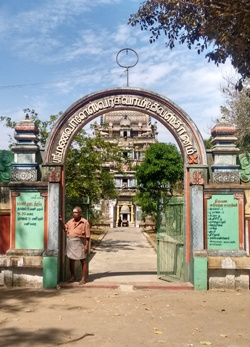
The entrance of the temple

Kalyanasundareswarar Temple is a Hindu temple dedicated to Shiva, located at Thiruvelvikudi in the Kuthalam taluk of Mayiladuthurai district of Tamil Nadu, India. It is dedicated to Shiva. Also known as Manavaleswarar Temple, it is situated on the northern bank of the Kaveri River. The temple is associated with the Tevaram hymns of the Shaivite saints Sambandar and Sundarar, and contains inscriptions and architectural features dating to the Chola period.

== Deity ==
The presiding deity is Kalyanasundareswarar and the consort is Parimala Sugantha Nayaki.

== Significance ==
According to local legend, a prince who was unable to marry the woman of his choice performed penance and worshipped Shiva at this place. The legend associates this event with the name Mana-velvik-kudi, meaning the place of the wedding penance. The temple is mentioned in the Tevaram hymns of Sambandar and Sundarar.

Sundarar is believed to have bathed in the Agni theertham at this spot to cure himself. Thiruvelvikudi was also the place where Shiva granted half of his body to Parvathi making Thiruvelvikudi the birthplace of the Ardhanarisvara cult. The temple is counted as one of the temples built on the banks of River Kaveri.

== History ==
The temple has been associated with the Tevaram hymns of Sambandar and Sundarar, indicating that it existed by the seventh century. The temple's inscriptions document donations and religious endowments made during the Chola period. The records include gifts of livestock, gold, land and silver vessels for maintaining lamps, conducting worship and providing offerings to the deity.

The temple's original structure has been tentatively dated to the reigns of Aditya I or Parantaka I. Inscriptions from the reigns of the Chola kings Aditya I, Uttama Chola and Rajendra I refer to the temple and its associated village assemblies. An inscriptional record also refers to the renovation of the temple during the reign of Uttama Chola. The village appears under different names, including Murugavel-mangalam and Tiruvelvikkudi, in the inscriptions.

The inscriptions also record contributions by individual donors and mercantile communities towards the temple's construction and maintenance. These included donations of structural stones, doorposts and sculptural images. The mercantile communities Valanjiyar and Tisai-Ayirattu-Ainnurruvar are mentioned in connection with contributions to the temple structure.

The temple's sculptural programme includes representations of Dakshinamurti, Lingodbhava and Brahma in the sanctum's niches, and Agastya, Nataraja, Ganapati, Chandesanugrahamurti, Durga and Bhikshatana in the ardhamandapa.

== Gallery ==
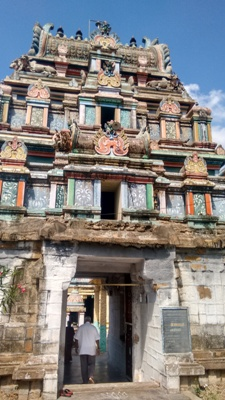

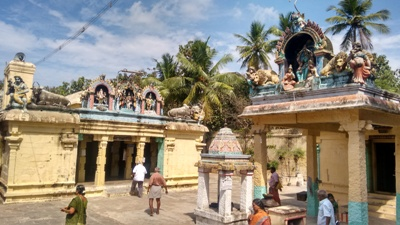

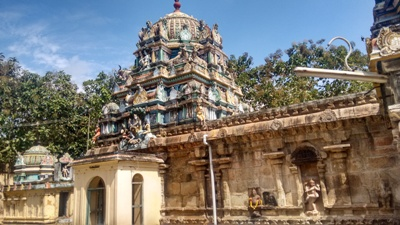

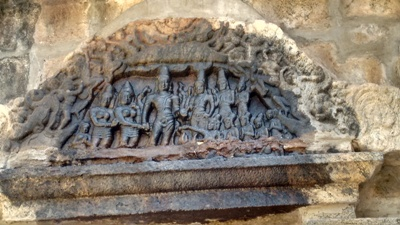

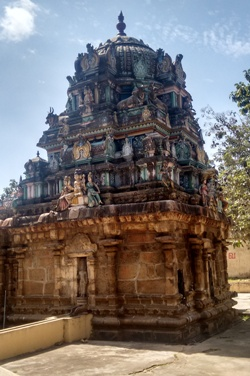

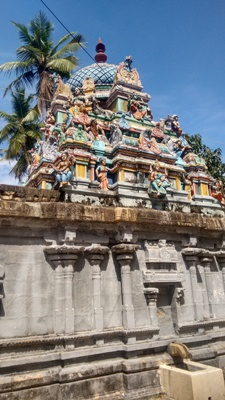
