= Mahalakshmeeswarar Temple =

Religion
- Affiliation: Hinduism
- District: Mayiladuthurai district
- Deity: Lord (Shiva)

Location
- Location: Tirunindriyur in the Mayiladuthurai district
- State: Tamil Nadu
- Country: India

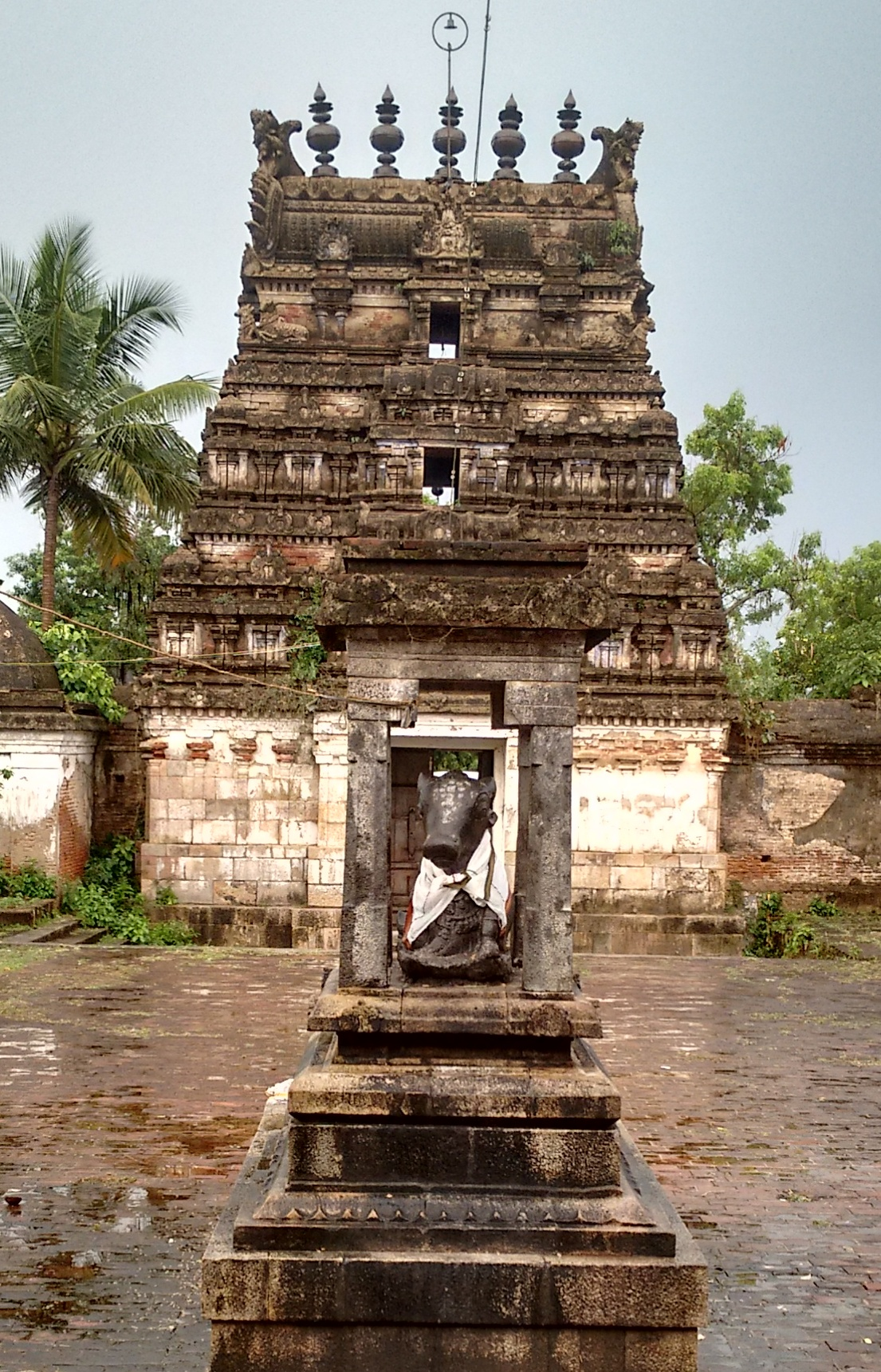
Rajagopura and Nandhi

Mahalakshmeeswarar Temple (Tamil: மகாலட்சுமீஸ்வரர் கோயில்) is a Hindu temple located in the village of Tirunindriyur in the Mayiladuthurai district of Tamil Nadu, India.

== Location ==
The Mahalakshmeeswarar temple is located in the village of Tirunandriyur, 7 kilometres from Mayiladuthurai en route to Sirkazhi.

== Significance ==
The temple is 1000–2000 years old and dedicated to Shiva. Hymns on the temple have been composed by the Nayanmars Sambandar, Appar and Sundarar. Lakshmi, the consort of Vishnu is believed to have worshipped Shiva in the temple and hence the presiding deity is called Mahalakshmeeswarar..

== Legend ==
According to legend, a Chola king was travelling through the place when the torch carried by his men went off. It automatically started burning when the entourage had crossed the spot. On inquiring from a local shepherd, the king learnt that a holy shivalinga had been buried at the spot. The king found the shivalinga and built a temple to Shiva.

Tirunindriyur is also believed to be the place where Shiva gave darshan to Parasurama in order to relieve him of the sin of matricide.
