= Uyyakondan Thirumalai Temple =

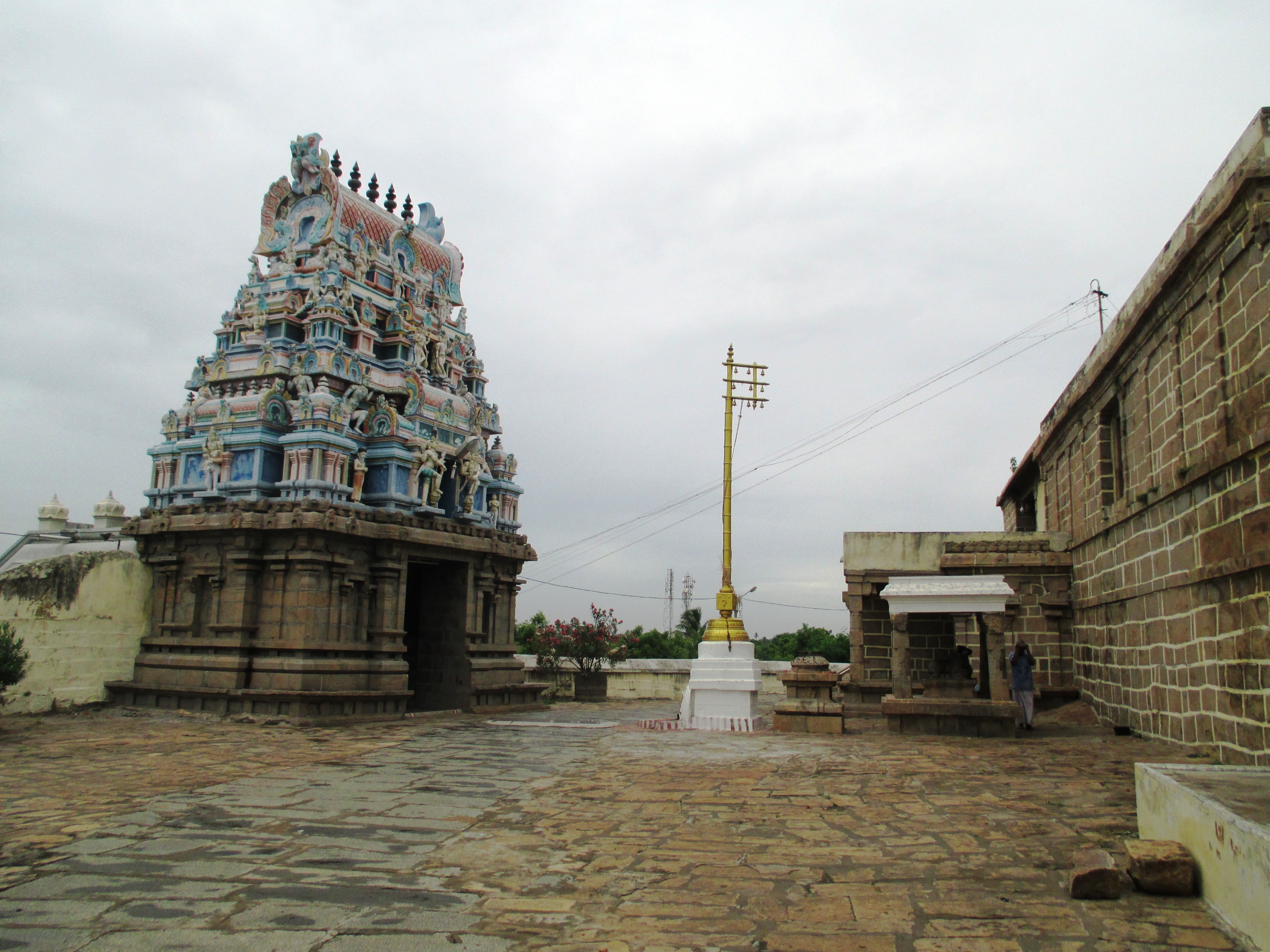

Religion
- Affiliation: Hinduism
- District: Tiruchirapalli
- Deity: Ujjevanathar, Anjanakshi Amman

Location
- Location: Tiruchirapalli
- State: Tamil Nadu
- Country: India
- Interactive map of Uyyakondan Thirumalai Temple
- Coordinates: 10°48′57″N 78°39′33″E

Architecture
- Type: Dravidian architecture
- Creator: Chola kings

Uyyakondan Thirumalai Temple (also called Ujeevanathar temple, Karkudimalai or Thirumalainallur)) is a Hindu temple dedicated to the deity Shiva, located on the banks of Uyyakondan river, Trichy, in the South Indian state of Tamil Nadu. Shiva is worshipped as Uyyakondan, and is represented by the lingam. His consort Parvati is depicted as Anjanakshi Amman. The presiding deity is revered in the 7th century Tamil Saiva canonical work, the Tevaram, written by Tamil saint poets known as the Nayanars and classified as Paadal Petra Sthalam.

The temple complex covers four acres, constructed on a hillock 30 m (98 ft). The temple has a number of shrines, with those of Uyyakondar and his consorts Maivizhi and Kanniyumaiyal, being the most prominent. All the shrines of the temple are enclosed in large concentric rectangular granite walls. The temple is approached by a flight of steps from the basement that houses the temple tank.

The original complex is believed to have been built by Cholas. In modern times, the temple is maintained and administered by the Hindu Religious and Charitable Endowments Department of the Government of Tamil Nadu. The temple has inscriptions from the Chola period.

== History ==
The temple is built in Sembian age of Cholas around 950 CE. There are many inscriptions in the temple. An inscription from the period of Rajaraja I indicates donation of a crown to the temple by Sembiyan Mahadevi during his 10th regnal year. The temple has inscriptions dating from Kulothunga Chola I (1070–1118 CE), that speaks of a separate community known as Rathakarar, a sect of expert carpenter skilled in the art of designing and making temple cars. The Uyyakondan Channel was built as a tributary by Rajaraja Chola to irrigate the lands near Tiruchirapalli. The temple was occupied by French and English forces during the siege of Trichonopoly (old Tiruchirapalli) in 1753–54. After the war battle of Sugar-loaf rock, English Major Lawrence marched against the fortified temple and carried it by assault. In modern times, the temple is maintained and administered by the Hindu Religious and Charitable Endowments Department of the Government of Tamil Nadu.

== Architecture ==
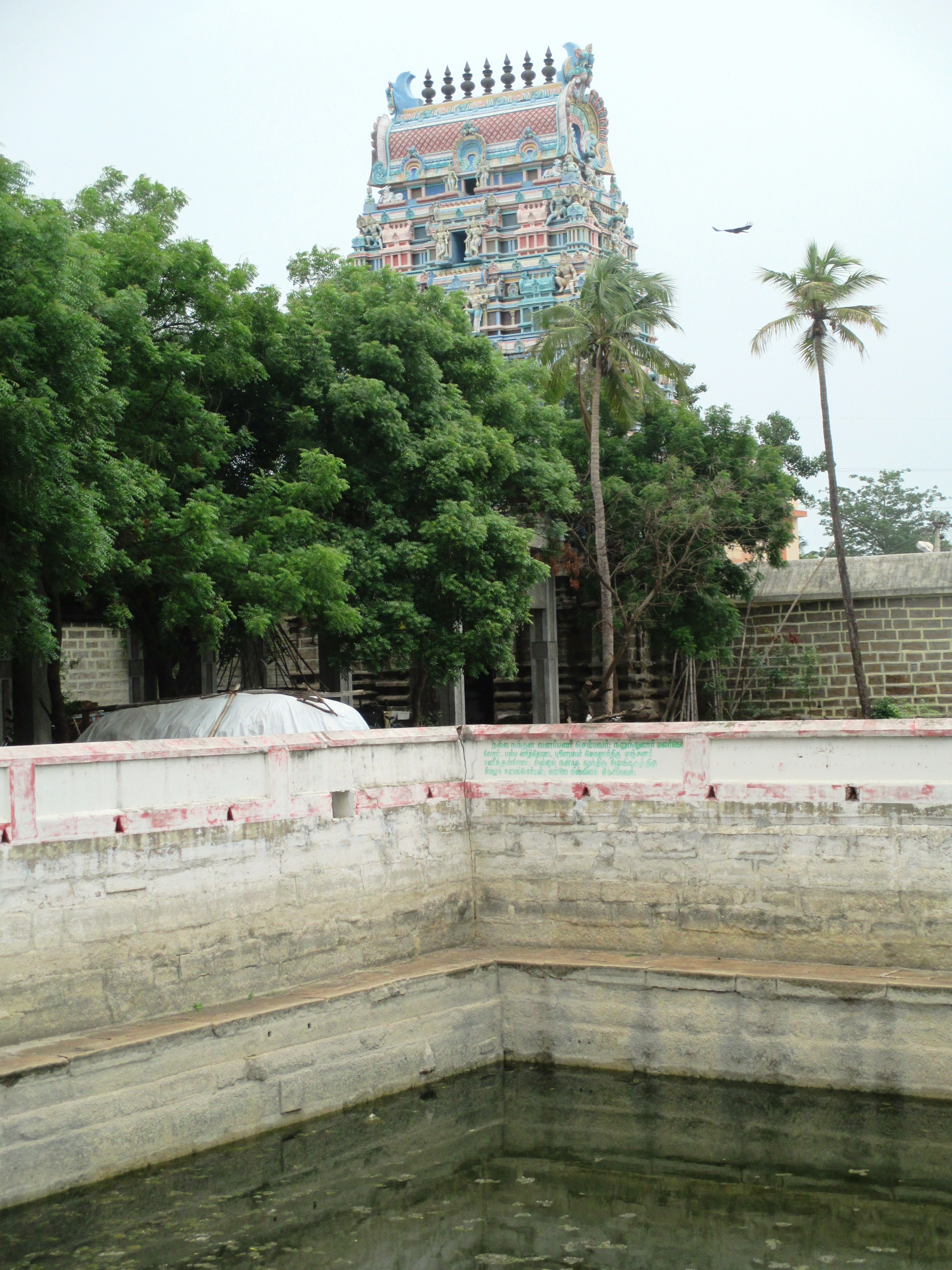
Main gopura

The temple is located in Uyyakondanmalai, a village on the outskirts of Trichy in the South Indian state of Tamil Nadu on the Trichy - Vayalur road. The temple is counted as one of the temples built on the banks of River Kaveri. The temple is located on a rock about 30 metres (98 ft) tall and is surrounded by granite walls. The temple is reached by a flight of steps. The shrine of Vinayagar is located in a cut in the first ten steps and the other shrines are located on the hillock. The whole temple is fortified and the temple tank is located inside the fortification. The main deity of the temple faces western direction. There are two shrines of Parvati in the temple.

== Festivals and religious importance ==
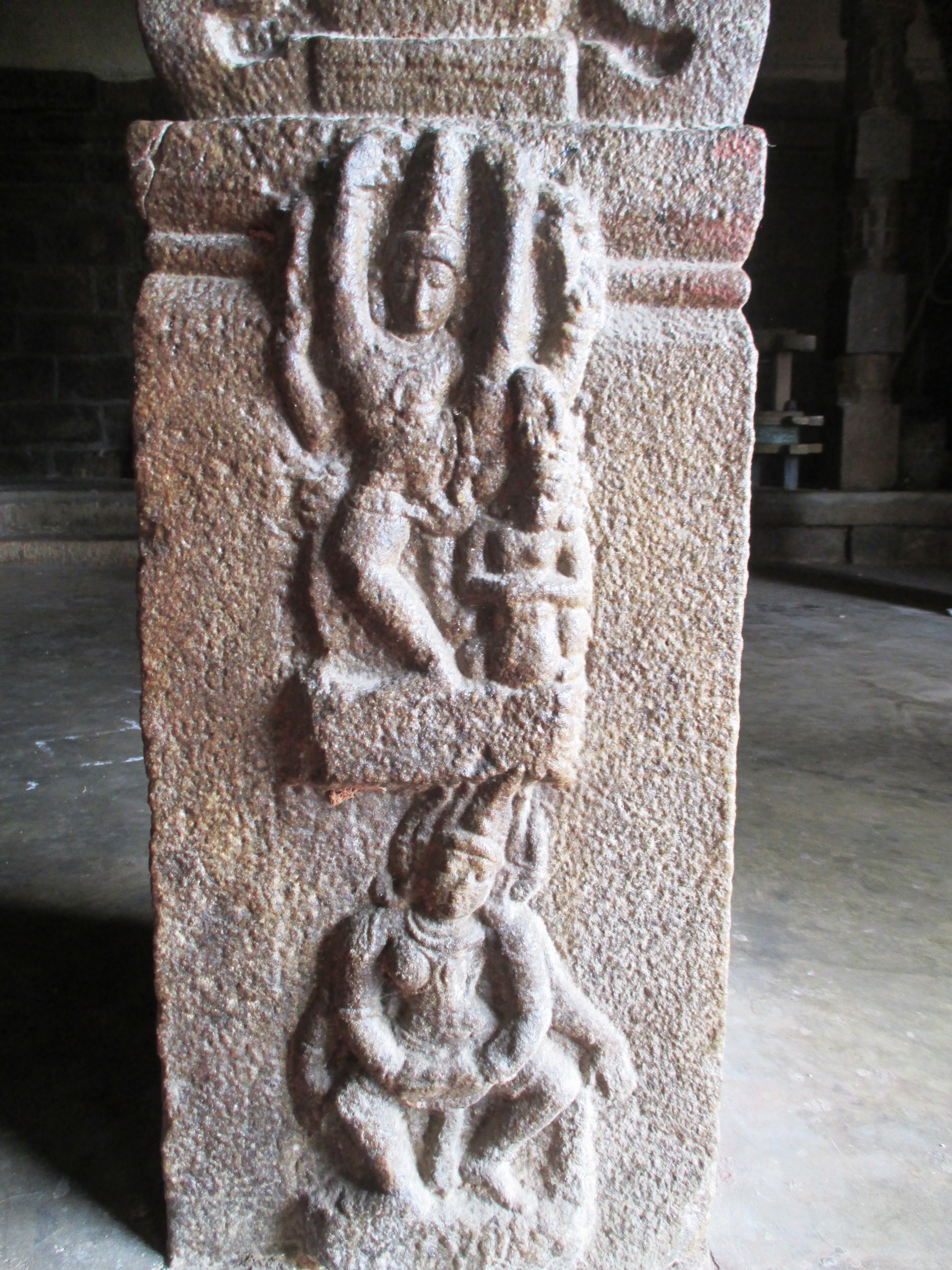
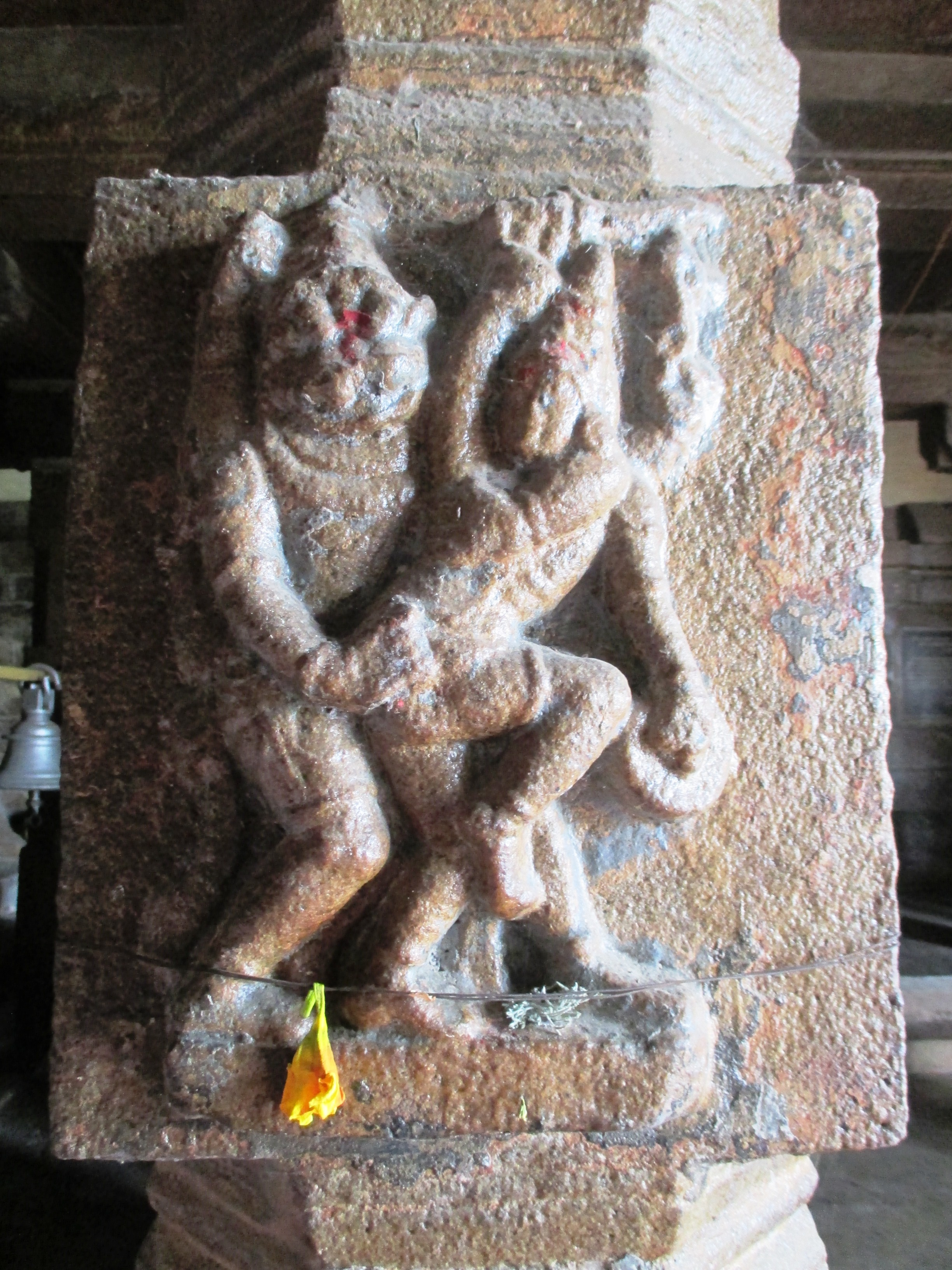
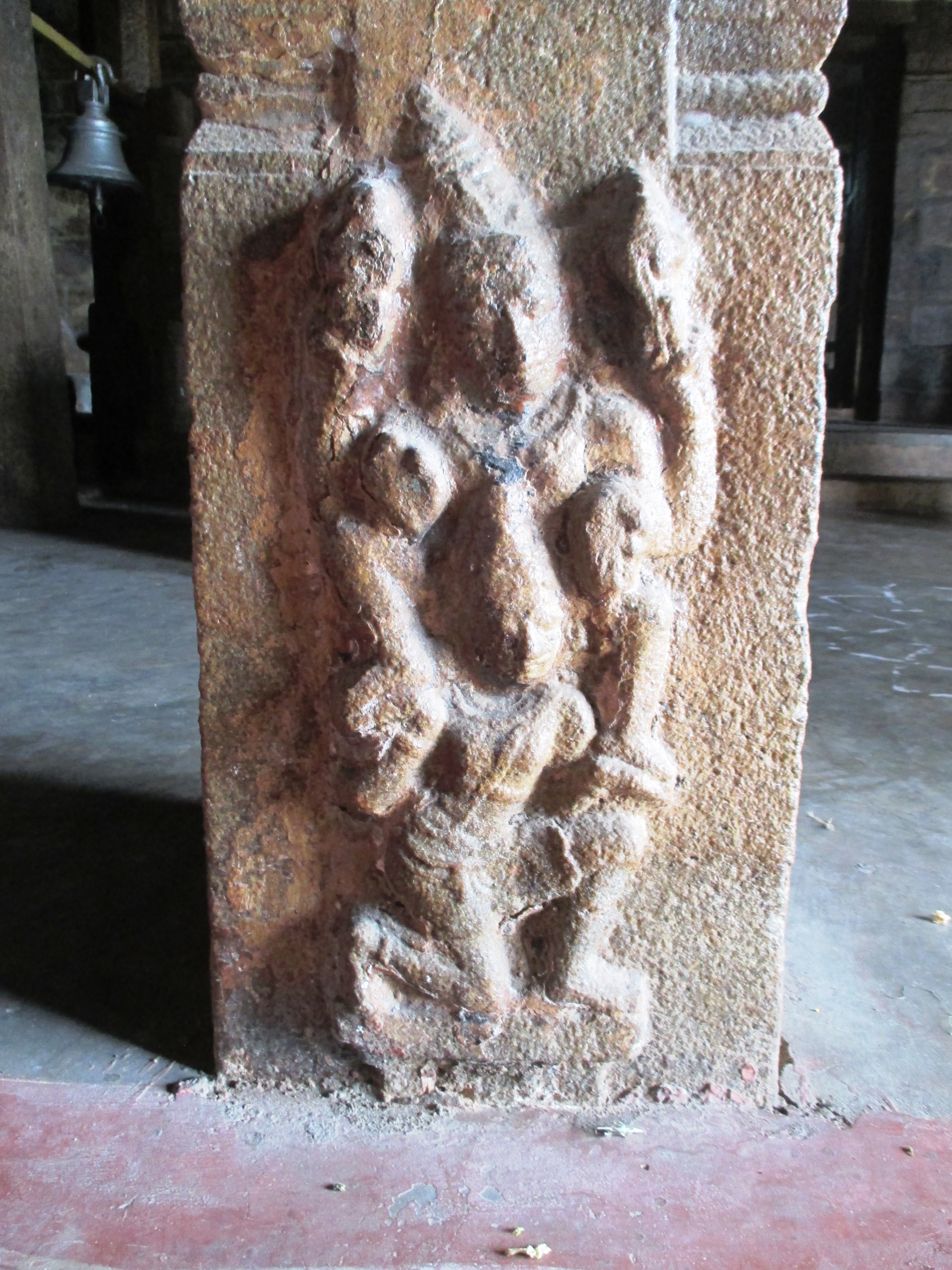
Images of various pillars in the temple

The presiding deity is believed to have been worshipped by Narada, Markandeya, Karan and Arunagirinathar. The temple is mentioned in the 7th–8th century Saivite canonical literature, Tevaram, by all the three poets, namely, Appar, Campantar and Cuntarar. A Sri Lankan king is believed to have been blessed by the deity here.
