= Bhaktajaneswarar Temple =

Temple in India

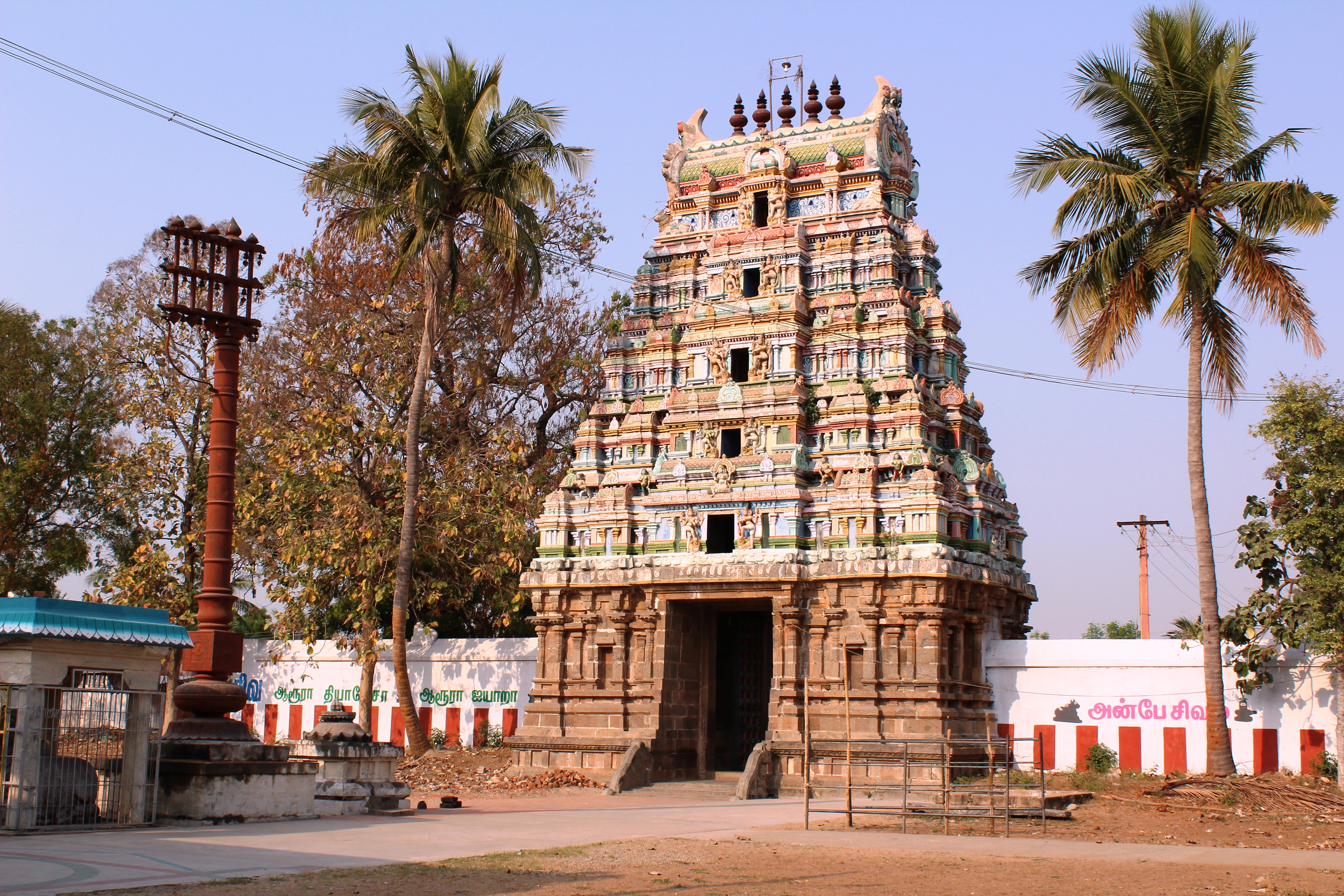

- Location in Tamil Nadu

Religion
- Affiliation: Hinduism
- District: Viluppuram
- Deity: Bhaktajaneswarar(Shiva)

Location
- State: Tamil Nadu
- Country: India
- Coordinates: 11°45′31.5″N 79°23′55.5″E

Architecture
- Type: Dravidian architecture

Bhaktajaneswarar Temple (also called Thirunavalur Temple or Bhathajaneeswaram) is a Hindu temple to the deity Shiva in Thirunavalur, a village in Viluppuram district in the Indian state of Tamil Nadu. Shiva is worshipped as Bhaktajaneswarar, and is represented by the lingam. His consort Parvati is depicted as Manonmani Amman. The temple is located on the Panruti - Kedilam road. The presiding deity is revered in the 7th century Tamil Saiva canonical work, the Tevaram, written by Tamil saint poets known as the nayanmars and classified as Paadal Petra Sthalam. The temple is closely associated with Sundarar, who is believed to have attained grace at this place.

The temple complex covers an area of two acres and all its shrines are enclosed with concentric rectangular walls. The temple has a number of shrines, with those of Bhaktajaneswarar, his consort Manonmani Amman and Ranganathar being the most prominent.

The original complex is believed to have been built by Cholas, with later additions from different ruling dynasties. In modern times, the temple is maintained and administered by the Hindu Religious and Charitable Endowments Department of the Government of Tamil Nadu.

== Legend and history ==
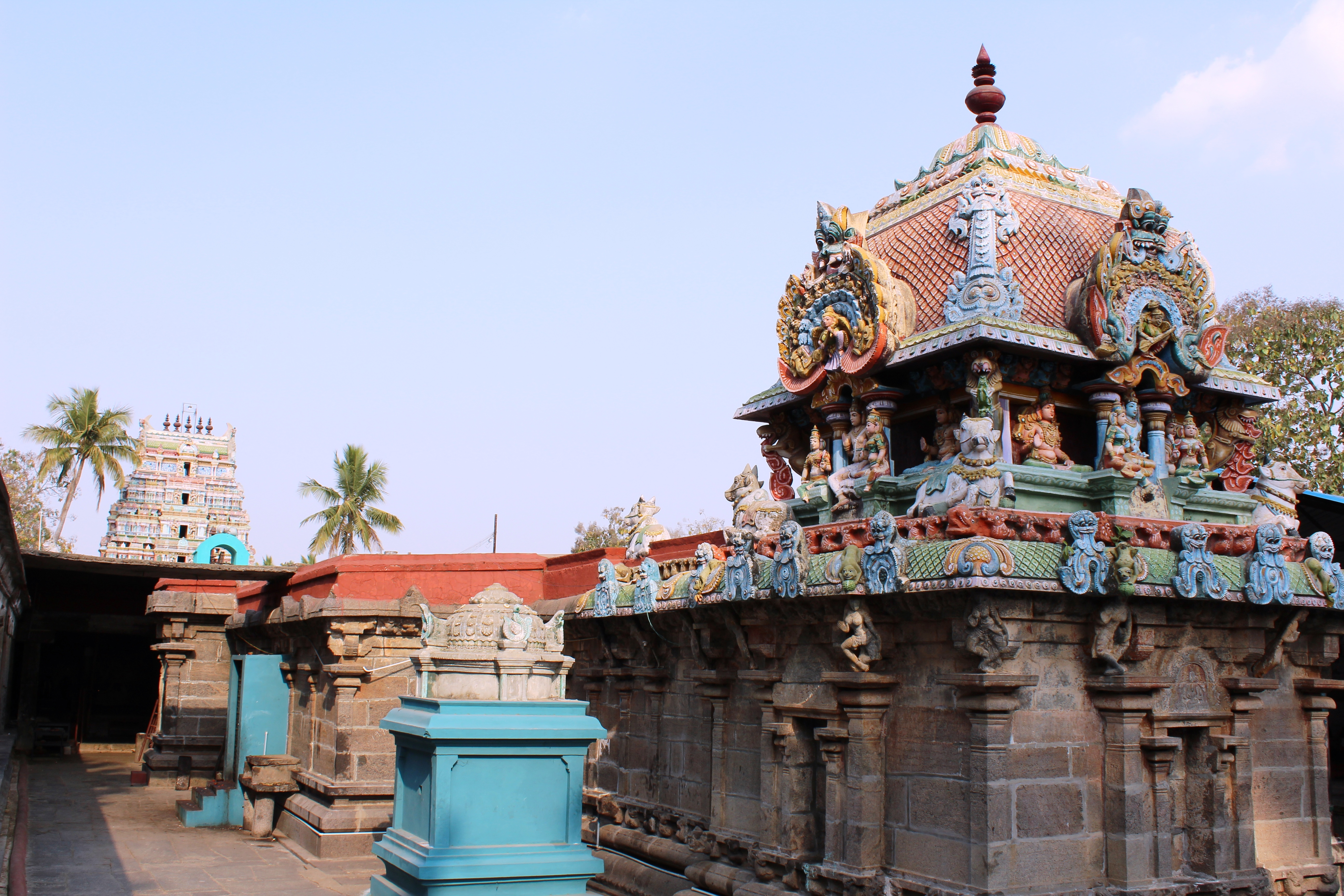
The main shrines of the temple

As per Hindu legend, during the churning of the Ocean of milk, a sperm fell at this place to originate as a "Naval" tree. It came to be known as Jambuvanam and over the period of several eons, a temple formed in the place. The place thus came to be known as Navalur while presiding deity came to be known as Thirunavleesan.

As per another legend, Sukra (Venus) obtained the diving elixir that could bring back dead people. During the fight between Devas, the celestial deities and Asuras, the demons, Sukra helped the Asuras by bringing them back to life repeatedly. The Devas complained it to Shiva, who swallowed Sukra. He then brought him back to life and installed him as one of the Navagrahas, the planetary deities. He also instructed him to help devotees based on the deeds. Sundarar, an 8th-century saivite saint was born in the place and believed to have attained divinity by worshipping Shiva at the place.

The place is also believed to be the one where Adisesha got back his original colour attained on account of the poison. Brahma is believed to have worshipped the deity during Dvapara Yuga, while Sivapriyar, who went on to become Chandekeswarar worshipped the deity during Treta Yuga.

== History ==
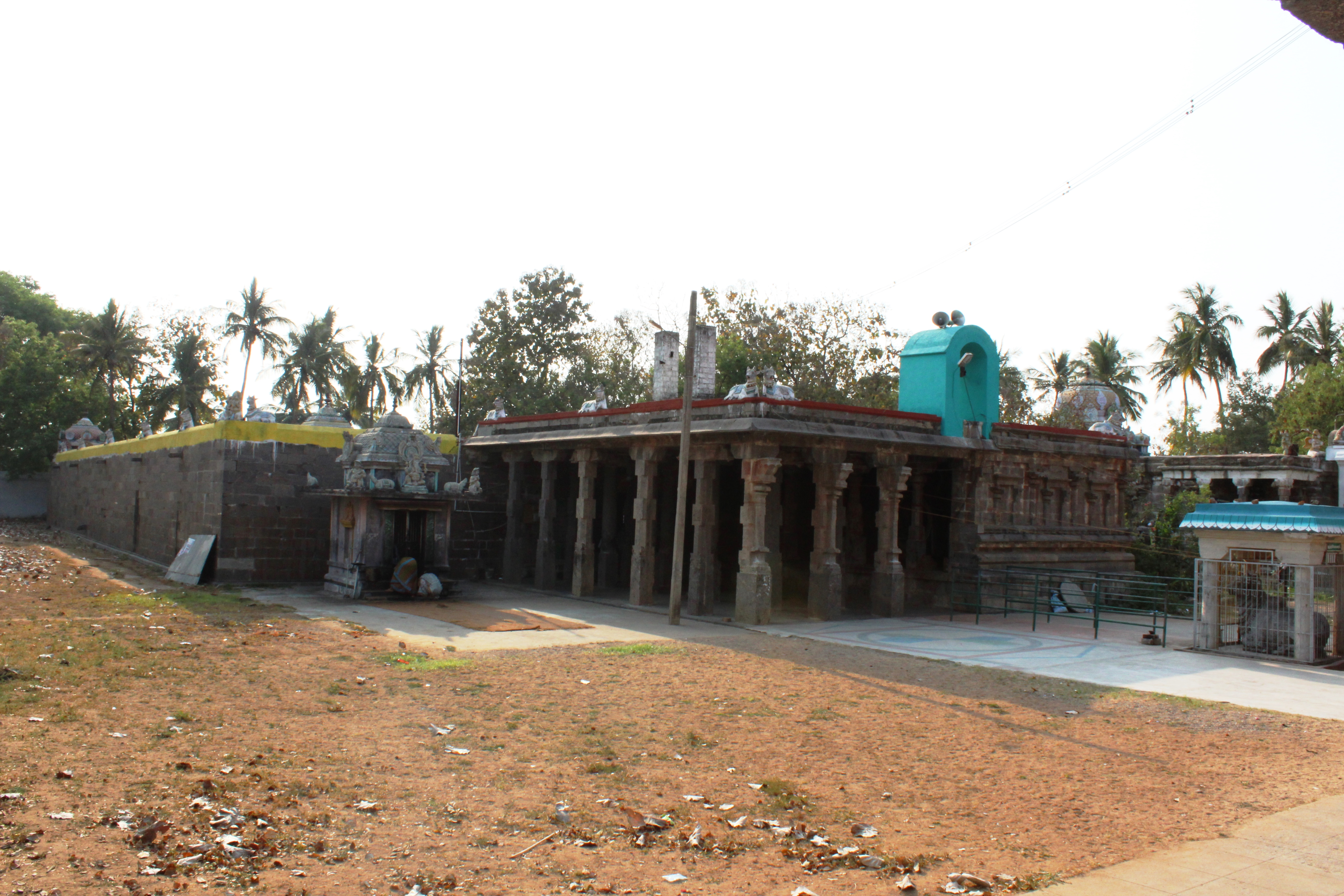
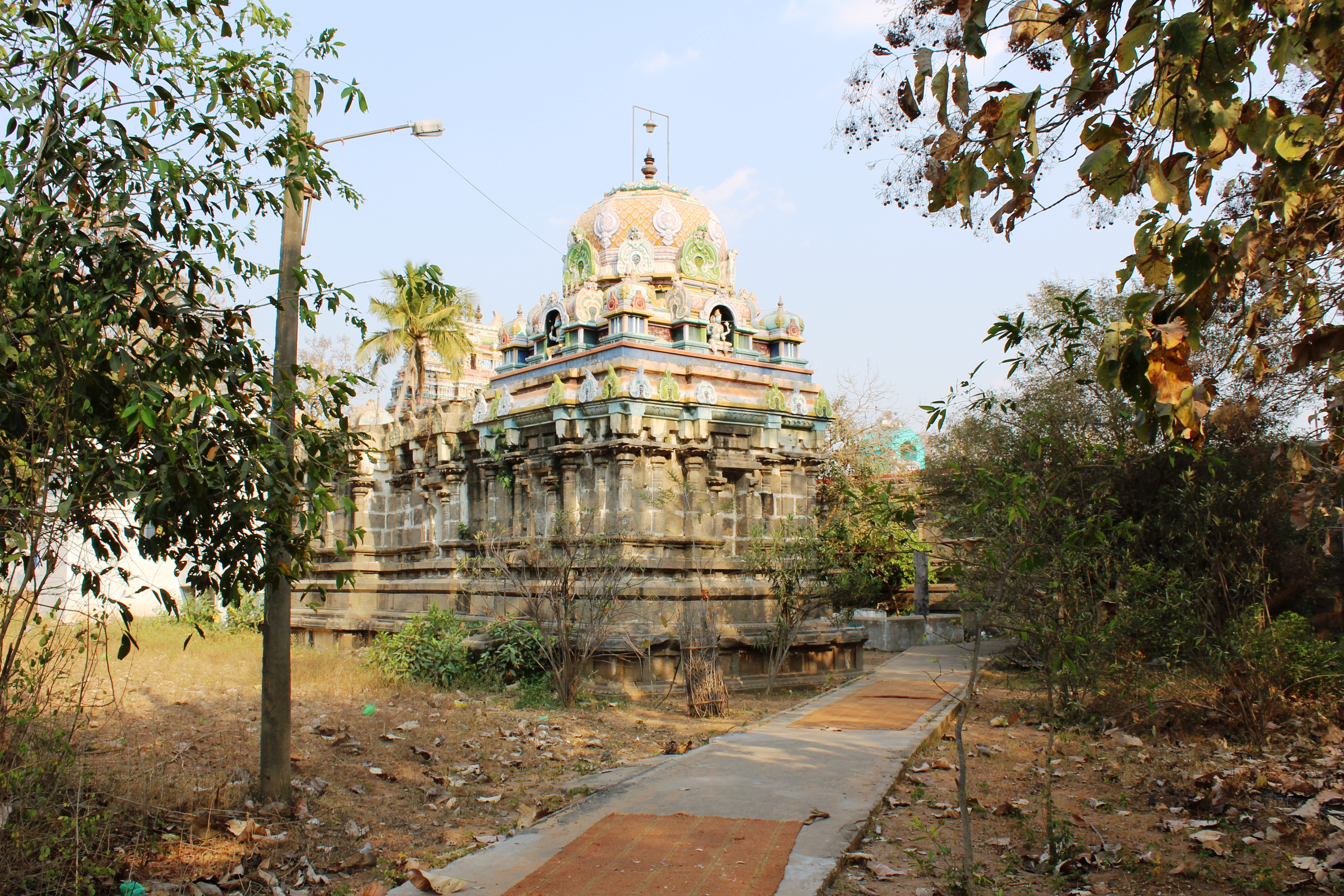
Shrines of the temple

The original structure is believed to be existent from time immemorial, while the later additions are believed to have been built by Cholas, Pallavas, while the present masonry structure was built during the 16th century. As per inscriptions from the period of Parantaka I, there were seemingly three Shiva temples and one Vishnu temple in the place. One of the three, a Pallava temple named Kalinarisvaram, was destroyed by the locals. The inscriptions during the 32nd regnal year Parantaka I (recorded as 348 of 1902) mentions gifts to the Vishnu temple by Rajaditta-devar for perpetual lighting of the temple. The other two Shiva temples are called Rajaditta Isvarattu Mahadevar temple and Agasteeswaram (recorded as 347 of 1902). While Agasteeswaram cannot be traced, Rajaditta Isvarattu Mahadevar temple (also called Rajaditta Isvaram) is the Bhaktajaneeswarar temple. The other inscriptions in the temple indicate the conversion of it to a stone temple from an earlier structure made of bricks. The inscriptions from Kannara-deva (Rashtrakuta Krishna III), mentions the Kannaradeva defeating the Cholas and death of Rajaditya during the Takkolam war.

== Architecture ==
Bhaktajaneswarar temple is located in a village called Thirunavalur on Viluppuram - Kedilam main road. The temple has a flat entrance tower facing south, and all the shrines of the temple are enclosed in concentric rectangular granite walls. The central shrine is approached through pillared halls. The central shrine facing east houses the image of Bhaktajaneswarar in the form of lingam (an iconic form of Shiva). The shrine of Manonmani Amman, facing south, is located in separate shrine around the first precinct. The central shrine is approached through a Mahamandapam and Arthamandapam. The sanctum is a square structure measuring 15 ft (4.6 m), while the rectangular ardhamandapa projects 9 ft (2.7 m). The notable features of the outer structure of the sanctum has yali friezes, kumudam mouldings, Bhootaganas and dancing figures. As in other Shiva temples in Tamil Nadu, the shrines of Vinayaka, Murugan, Navagraha, Chandekeswara and Durga are located around the precinct of the main shrine. The second precinct also has a shrine of Ranganatha and a garden around the periphery of the compound wall. The shrine of Sundarar is located in the northeastern corner of the precinct. Sundarar is sported in standing posture along with his two consorts on either sides.
