= Soundareswararswamy Temple, Thiruppanaiyur =

Shiva temple in Tamil Nadu, India

Soundareswararswamy Temple
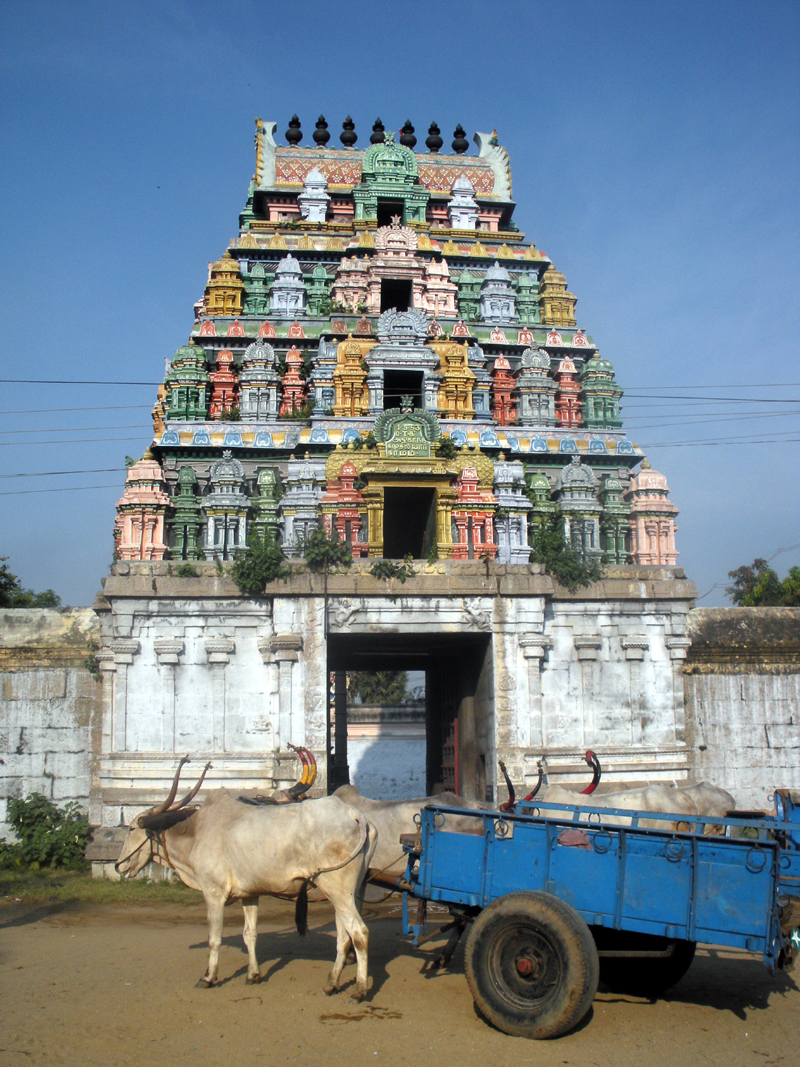

- Location in Tamil Nadu

Religion
- Affiliation: Hinduism
- District: Tiruvarur
- Deity: Soundareswararswamy Swamy(Shiva)

Location
- Location: Thiruppanaiyur, Tiruvarur, Tamil Nadu, India
- State: Tamil Nadu
- Country: India
- Coordinates: 10°51′47″N 79°39′24″E

Architecture
- Type: Dravidian architecture

The Soundareswararswamy Temple or Sountharyanathar temple is a Hindu temple dedicated to the God Shiva. It is situated in the village of Thiruppanaiyur, three and a half kilometres (2.2 mi) from Nannilam. The temple is centred on a palmyra tree which is the sthalavrksham. The palmyra tree gives its name to the village itself ("Thiru" (holy) + "Panai" (palm) + "Ur" (city) or the "city of the holy palm"). In addition to the shrine to Shiva, the temple prominently features a sannidhi (shrine) dedicated to Goddess Devi Periyanayagi Amman/ Devi Brihannayaki Amba.

== Significance ==
It is one of the shrines of the 275 Paadal Petra Sthalams. Sthala Purana (Shrine Legend) has it that Sundarar composed several hymns to Shiva at this temple. Sthala purana of the shrine also states that Rshi Parashara worshipped God Shiva at this shrine.

The temple is popular due to its association with the Early Chola king Karikala. It is believed that Karikala was standing under the palmyra tree when the royal elephant of the Cholas identified him as the king. Karikala was then taken to the capital on elephant back to be crowned Emperor.

== Photogallery ==
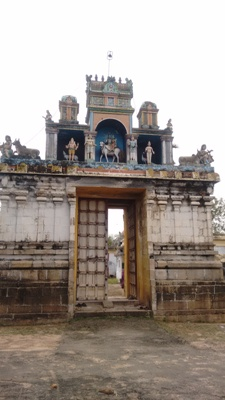
Main entrance

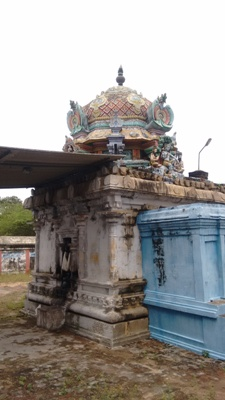
Vimana of the presiding deity

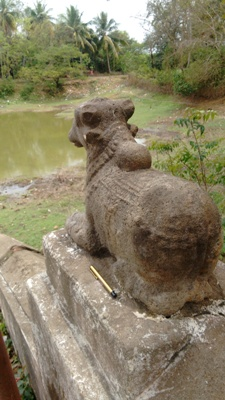
Nandi facing temple tank
