= Tholambra =

- village
- Location in Kerala, India Tholambra (India)
- Coordinates: 11.901367°N 75.673127°E
- Country: India
- State: Kerala
- District: Kannur

Area
  - Total: 16.1 km^{2} (6.2 sq mi)

Population (2011)
  - Total: 6,267
  - Density: 389/km^{2} (1,010/sq mi)

Languages
  - Official: Malayalam, English
- Time zone: UTC+5:30 (IST)
- ISO 3166 code: IN-KL
- Nearest city: Peravoor, Maloor

Tholambra is a village in Kannur district in the Indian state of Kerala. The Maloor police station is situated in Tholambra village.

== Demographics ==
As of 2011 Census, Tholambra had a population of 6,267 with 3,016 (48.1%) males and 3,251 (51.9%) females. Tholambra village has an area of 16.1 km^{2} (6.2 sq mi) with 1,422 families residing in it. Average sex ratio was 1078 lower than the state average of 1084. In Tholambra, 10.3% of the population was under 6 years of age. Tholambra had an average literacy of 93.4% lower than the state average of 94%.

== Transportation ==
The national highway passes through Kannur town. Mangalore and Mumbai can be accessed on the northern side and Cochin and Thiruvananthapuram can be accessed on the southern side. The road to the east of Iritty connects to Mysore and Bangalore. The nearest railway station is Kannur on Mangalore-Palakkad line. There are airports at Mangalore Calicut and Kannur International Airport Kannur.

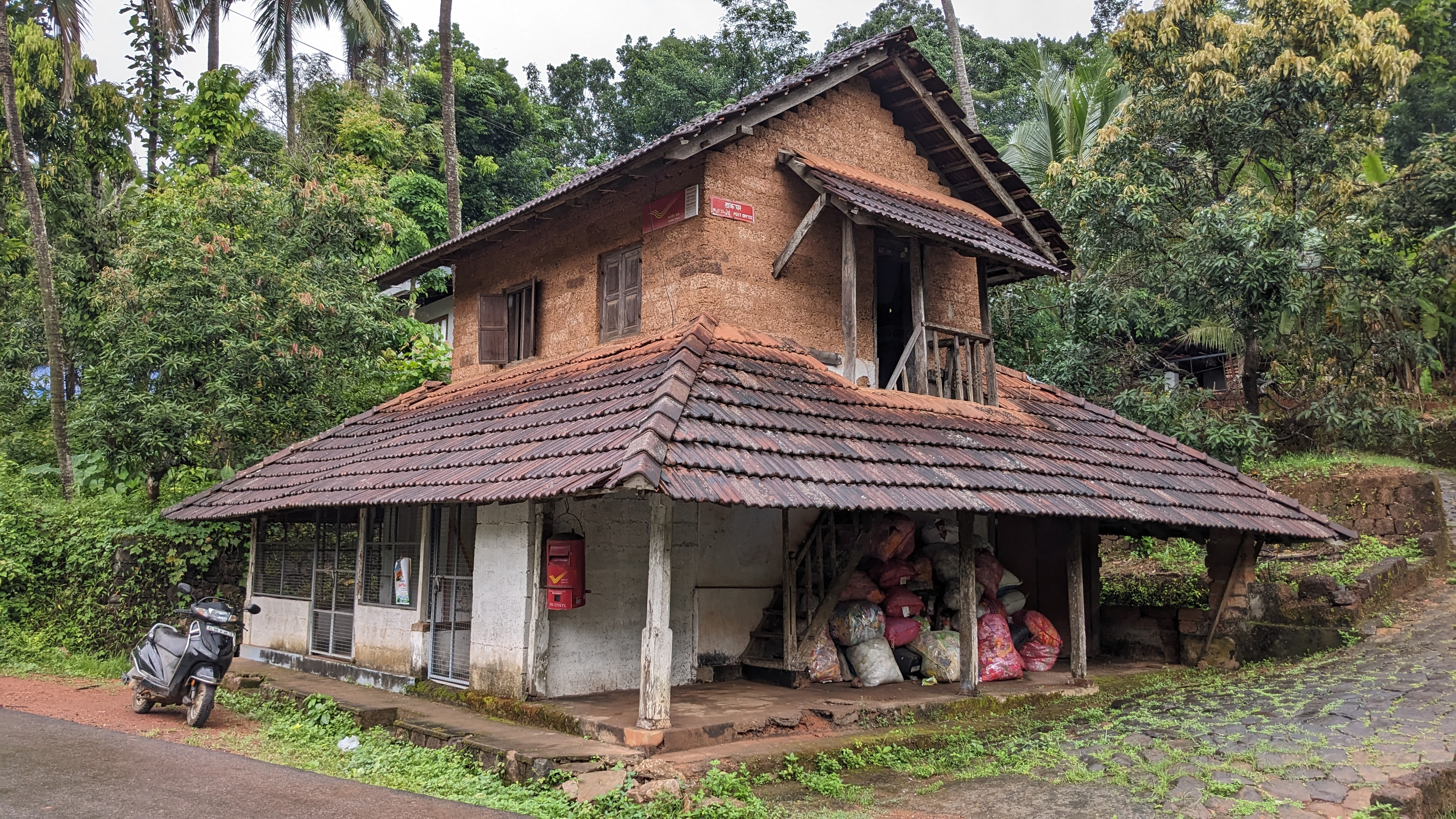
Tholambra post office
