= Shivpuri colony =

Shivpuri Colony is one of the popular residential developments in Indira Nagar. Shivpuri Colony is located next to Kukrail Reserve Forest in Lucknow. It a well planned privately built residential colony which is specifically marketed for its rejuvenating environment. This is connected via Picnic Spot Road running all the way from Munshipulia to Kukrail Reserve Forest. It is a modern builtup society with higher living standards.
