= Sivapuram, Thiruvallur =

Sivapuram
- Village
- Nickname: Sivapuram Colony
- Location in Tamil Nadu, India
- Coordinates: 13.34°N 80.22°E
- Country: India
- State: Tamil Nadu
- District: Thiruvallur

Languages
  - Official: Tamil
- Time zone: UTC+5:30 (IST)
- PIN: 601204

Sivapuram, also called Sivapuram Colony) is a small village/hamlet in Minjur block in Tiruvallur district of Tamil Nadu, India. It comes under Aladu Panchayath. It is located 45 kilometers west of the district headquarters Tiruvallur, 1 km from Minjur and 34 kilometers from the state capital Chennai. PIN for Sivapuram is 601204 and postal head office is Ponneri.

Sivapuram comes under Ponneri state constituency and Tiruvallur parliament constituency.

== Nearby cities ==
Ponneri, Ambattur, Chennai and Tiruvallur are the nearby cities to Sivapuram.

== Access ==
Sivapuram lies on the road from Thiruvallur to Thakkolam. The nearest railway station is Ponneri.
