= Sivapuram, Kerala =

Sivapuram
- town
- Location in Kerala, India
- Coordinates: 11.9075°N 75.6048°E
- Country: India
- State: Kerala
- District: Kannur
- Taluk: Thalassery

Area
  - Total: 25.28 km^{2} (9.76 sq mi)

Population (2011)
  - Total: 16,047
  - Density: 634.8/km^{2} (1,644/sq mi)

Languages
  - Official: Malayalam, English
- Time zone: UTC+5:30 (IST)
- PIN: 670702
- Telephone code: 91490
- ISO 3166 code: IN-KL
- Vehicle registration: KL 58
- Nearest city: Mattannur
- Lok Sabha constituency: Kannur
- Vidhan Sabha constituency: Mattannur

Sivapuram is a town in Kannur district in the Indian state of Kerala.

== Educational institutions ==
=== Professional colleges ===
- St. Thomas College of Engineering and Technology (STM)

== Demographics ==
As of 2011 Census, Sivapuram had a population of 16,047 with 7,651 males and 8,396 females. Sivapuram village has an area of 25.28 km^{2} (9.76 sq mi) with 3,495 families residing in it. The average sex ratio was 1097, higher than the state average of 1084. In Sivapuram, 11.5% of the population was under 6 years of age. Sivapuram had an average literacy of 94.1% higher than state average of 94%.

== Transportation ==
The national highway passes through Kannur town. Goa and Mumbai can be accessed on the northern side and Kochi and Thiruvananthapuram can be accessed on the southern side. The road to the east of Iritty connects to Mysore and Bangalore. The nearest railway station is Kannur on Mangalore-Palakkad line. Trains are available to almost all parts of India. There are airports at Mattanur, Mangalore and Kozhikode. All of them are international airports but direct flights are available only to Middle Eastern countries.
