= Sivapuram, Thanjavur =

Sivapuram
- village
- Location in Tamil Nadu, India Sivapuram (India)
- Coordinates: 10.93°N 79.41°E
- Country: India
- State: Tamil Nadu
- District: Thanjavur
- Taluk: Kumbakonam

Population (2001)
  - Total: 1,279

Languages
  - Official: Tamil
- Time zone: UTC+5:30 (IST)
- Telephone code: 0435

Sivapuram is a village in Thanjavur district, Tamil Nadu. It is located 5 kilometres south-east of Kumbakonam. As per the 2001 census, Sivapuram had a total population of 1,279.

Sivarapuram is famous for its Sivagurunathaswamy temple, one of the 276 sthalams mentioned in the Tevaram. The village is also infamous for the 1955 incident of the missing Chola bronzes.

== Location ==
Sivapuram is located 5 kilometres south-east of the town and taluk headquarters of Kumbakonam on the way to Thiruvarur.Srinivasanallur, Neikunnam, Kirangudi, Kothangudi and Valangaiman were some of the neighbouring villages.

== Population ==
According to the 2001 census, Sivapuram had a population of 1,279, 13 of whom belonged to Scheduled castes, with 271 households and a sex ratio of 938. There were 156 children under the age of 6 with a child sex ratio of 1,053.

The literacy rate for the village was 57.93. The male literacy rate was 64.09 while the female literacy rate was 51.37. 57.03 percent of the literates were males and 42.97 were females.

== Places of interest ==
=== Sivagurunathaswamy temple ===
Sivapuram is famous for the Sivagurunathaswamy temple dedicated to the Hindu god Shiva. The temple is one of holy abodes mentioned in the Thevaram located in the ancient Chola kingdom. The deity is also referred to as Sivagurunathar or Sivapuranathar. According to different legends, Vishnu, Brahma and Kubera had worshipped Shiva here at different times. As Kubera is believed to have worshipped here, the village is also known as Kuberapuri.

=== St. Sebastian church ===
Another prominent attraction of Sivapuram is St. Sebastian's church.
