= Jagadeesvarar Temple, Manamelkudi =

Shiva temple in Tamil Nadu, India

Jagadeesvarar Temple is a Hindu temple dedicated to the deity Shiva located at Manamelkudi of Pudukkottai district in Tamil Nadu, India.

== Location ==
The temple is located at a distance of 30 km. from Arantangi, in East Coast Road. From Pattukkottai and Arantangi buses are plying to this place.

== Presiding deity ==
The presiding deity of the temple is Jagadeesvarar and the goddess is known as Jagatrakshahi. In this temple mahikalampoo, arasu and vilva trees are found. For Shiva, Pradosha is held in a grand manner. For getting married and to beget children devotees worship the temple. Separate shrines are found for Kulachirai Nayanar, Gnanasambandar, Nindraseer Nedumarar and Mangayarkkarasiyar near the flagpost.

== Speciality ==
One of the 63 Nayanars, Kulachirai Nayanar worshipped the deity of the temple.

== Worshipping time ==
Pujas are held four times daily at Kalasanthi (9.00 a.m.), Uttchikkalam (noon 12.00), Sayaratchai (6.00 p.m.) and Arthajamam (8.00 p.m.). The temple is opened for worship from 6.00 to 12.00 noon and 4.30 to 8.30 p.m.
