= Isaignaniyar =

Nayanar saint

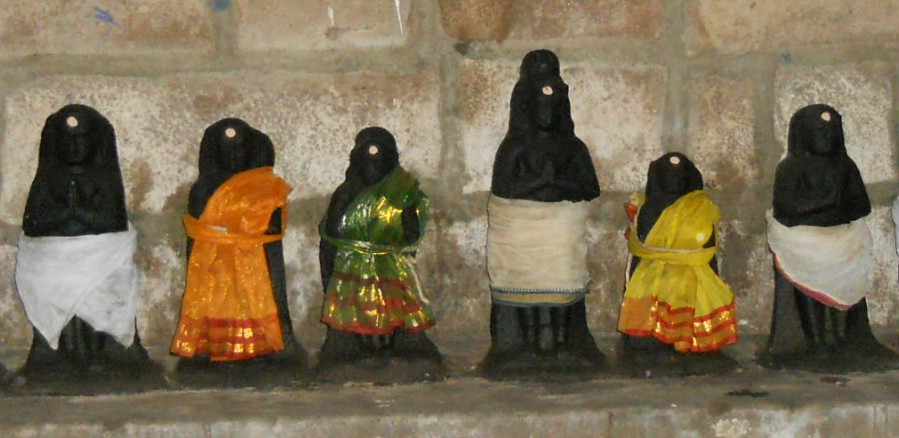
Family of Sundarar (l->r): Sadaya Nayanar (father), Isaignaniyar (mother), Paravai Nachiyar (wife), Sundarar, Sangili Nachiyar (wife), Narasinga Muniyaraiyar (foster-father).

Isaignaniyar (Tamil: இசைஞானியார், 7th century), also spelt as Isainaniyar, Isaignaniyaar, Isaignaniar and Isaijnaniyar and also known as Isai-jnani Ammaiyar (Isai-Gnani Ammaiyar), is the mother of Sundarar, one of the known Nayanar saints. She is regarded as a Nayanar saint, venerated in the Hindu sect of Shaivism, along with her husband Sadaiya Nayanar. She is counted as the last in the list of 63 Nayanars.

Isaignaniyar is one of the three female saints. Sundarar is the only Nayanar with both his parents enlisted as Nayanars. The inclusion of Isaignaniyar, streams on basis on her association with Sundarar, rather than individual merit. Her sainthood status is seen as a proof of the greatness of her son.

== Life ==
Little is known about her. The Tamil Periya Puranam by Sekkizhar (12th century), which is the hagiography of the 63 Nayanars and the primary source about their life, dedicates just an hymn to her, naming her son and husband. "As the divinely opulent wife of Sataiyanaar (Sadaiya Nayanar) and as a devotee of the lord who shattered the triple hostile citadels (Shiva as Tripurantaka), the poet realizes the inadequacy of the poetic medium to extol her glory." The couple are said to be devout devotees of the god Shiva, the patron god of Shaivism. They lived in Tirunavalur, in the kingdom of Thirumunaipadi, in present-day Indian state of Tamil Nadu. They belonged to Adi Shaiva sub-sect of Shaivism and belonged to the Brahmin (priest) caste. They are said to have lived an ideal Grihastha (householder's) life. The couple gave away Sundarar to Narasinga Muniyaraiyar, the chieftain of Thirumunaipadi and a Nayanar saint, for adoption. Sundarar grew up in luxury in the home of his foster-father. In another instance, she is described to adorn herself with vibhuti (sacred ash used by Shaivas).

The Chola king Kulothunga Chola II (1133–1148, called by his title Anapuya in the inscription) created inscriptions honouring Sundarar (called Aludaiya Nambi in the inscription) in his seventh year of reign. An inscription on the west wall of the second prakaram of the Thyagaraja Temple (dedicated to Shiva), Thiruvarur mentions Isaignaniyar. The Sanskrit part of the inscription records that the mother of Aludaiya Nambi, Isaignaniyar – also known as Gnani – was born in Kamalapura, the town of the inscription. Isaignaniyar is described to be born in the family of Gnanasivarcharya, who was a Shaiva and belonged to the Gautama gotra (lineage of the sage Gautama Maharishi). Besides being famous for its Shiva temple, Thiruvarur was also one of the five capital cities of the Chola Empire.

== Remembrance ==
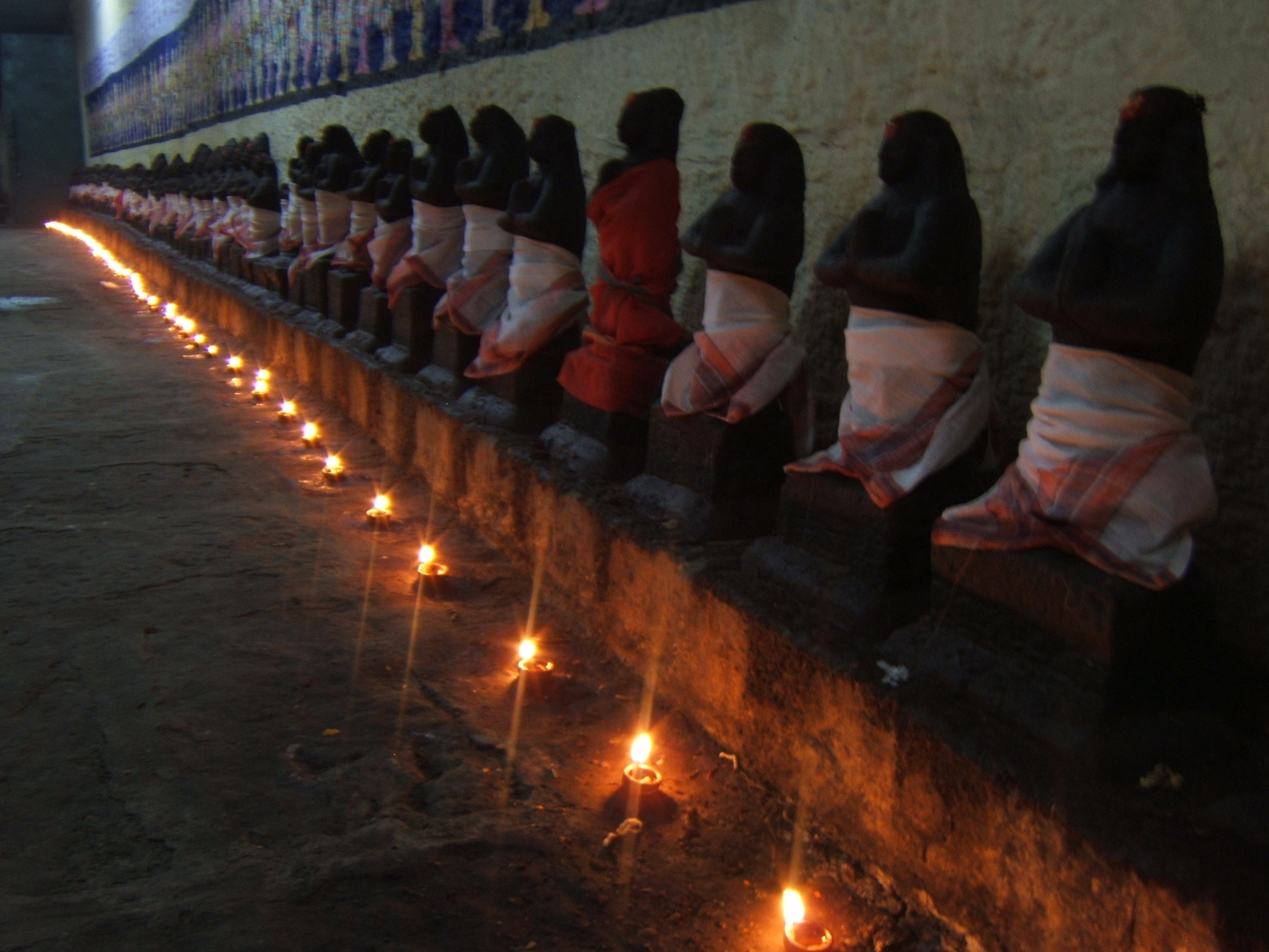
The images of the Nayanars are found in many Shiva temples in Tamil Nadu.

Sundarar refers to Isaignaniyar in the Tiruthonda Thogai, a hymn to Nayanar saints, which is the first compilation of the list. It is disputed if Sundarar enlists his parents as Nayanars in the hymn or he just names them in the last verse, which is a "signature-verse" (the last verse normally contained information about the poet of the work). However, in the second listing of the Nayanars, Nambi Andar Nambi formally includes Isaignaniyar in the list. He praises Sundarar's mother as a queen.

Isaignaniyar is worshipped in the Tamil month of Chithirai, when the moon crossed into the Chitrai nakshatra (lunar mansion). She is depicted standing with folded hands (see Anjali mudra). She receives collective worship as part of the 63 Nayanars. Their icons and brief accounts of his deeds are found in many Shiva temples in Tamil Nadu. Their images are taken out in procession in festivals.

Isaignaniyar is one of three female Nayanar saints, the others being the poet Karaikkal Ammaiyar and the Pandya queen Mangayarkkarasiyar. The inclusion of only three women in the Nayanars is interpreted as the influence of a patriarchal society. While the account of Karaikkal Ammaiyar is detailed, the life of Isaignaniyar and Mangayarkkarasiyar is explained in brief in the Periya Puranam. Sundarar's mother Isaignaniyar and another notable Nayanar Sambandar’s "foster-mother" Mangayarkkarasiyar were included in the list due to their maternal links.
