= Impalement of the Jains in Madurai =

7th-century event

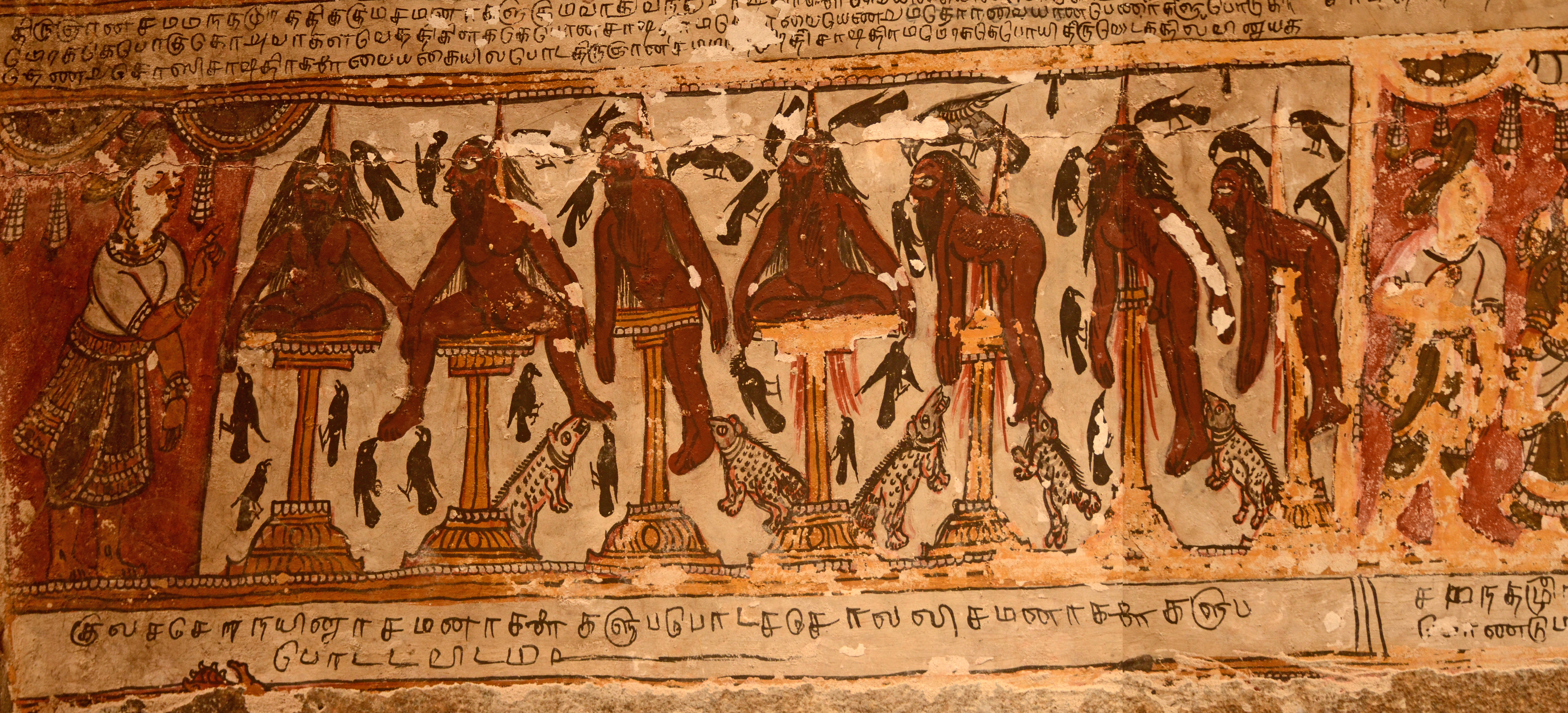
Impalement Mural at Avudaiyar Temple

The impalement of the Jains is a South Indian legend, first mentioned in an 11th-century hagiographic Tamil language text of Nambiyandar Nambi. According to the legend, Sambandar, who lived in the 7th century CE, defeated the Tamil Jain monks in a series of debates and contests on philosophy, thereby converted a Jain Pandyan king to Shaivism. The episode ended with the (voluntary) impalement of 8,000 Tamil Jains or Samanars as they were called.

Tamil literature and Tevaram songs like III.345 portray Jain monks as conspiring and persecuting Sambandar. However, there is no reference to any impalement of Jainas in Sambandar’s own poems or Tamil writings for about 400 years after him.

According to the early version of the legend, the Jains voluntarily impaled themselves in order to fulfill their vow after losing the debate. According to a much later version of the legend found in Takkayakapparani – a war poem, the newly converted king ordered the Jains to be impaled at Sambandar's instigation. The Pandyan king, variously called "Koon Pandiyan" or "Sundara Pandyan" in the legend is identified with the 7th century ruler Arikesari Maravarman.

== The legend ==
Sambandar was a child prodigy and poet-saint of Shaivism who lived in early 7th-century. According to early Tamil legends and literature, he began composing hymns as soon as he started speaking as a baby and who mastered the Vedas by age three. His gifts were attributed to being breastfed by the goddess Parvati. As a child poet-saint, he attracted throngs of audiences, travelled through Tamil lands to Shiva temples accompanied by musician Tirunilakantayalppanar, composing melodious hymns in complex meters and rhythms. His career lasted about 12 years and he died at age 16.

According to Tamil texts and Tevaram hymns such as III.345, Jain monks are depicted as one scheming against Sambandar and persecuting him. Yet, Sambandar's own hymns and Tamil texts for the next four centuries make no mention of the impalement of any Jain. From around the end of 11th-century, different hagiographical accounts appear with alleged Jain attempts to kill and torture the Shaiva child prodigy Sambandar followed by the alleged impalement of the Jains.

In one version, at the request of queen Mangayarkkarasiyar, Sambandar went to Madurai to counter the Jain monks in her husband's court. There the Jain monks allegedly attempt to burn the house he was staying in, but he remains unharmed. Then he is challenged to a debate by the Jain monks with the condition that the losing side convert to the winning side, or commit suicide by impaling themselves to death. Sambandar defeats the Jain monks in debate, the Pandya king and some Jains convert to Saivism. Other Jain monks die of impalement to honor the terms they made.

According to another version of the legend, the Pandyan ruler, who was a Jain, once suffered from high fever. Sambandar offered to help the king. The Jains monks opposed this, arguing that a Brahmin from the Chola country should not be trusted. They alleged Sambandar to be a part of conspiracy against the Jains, the king, the queen and a minister. The Jains sought to demonstrate Sambandar's incompetence by challenging him to a debate, and declared that they would become his slaves if defeated. Sambandar rejected the condition about slavery, and according to the second version of this legend, proposed that the Jains be impaled if defeated. He defeated the Jains in the ensuing debate, and the Shaivite devotees impaled the defeated Jains. Some Jains converted to Shaivism to escape the impalement.

In the third version, the condition about the losers' impalement was put forward by Shiva (instead of Sambandar). The fourth version states that, after defeating them in a debate. Sambandar did not want any impalement and urged the Jains to become Shaivites. However, the Jains refused the offer and voluntarily impaled themselves.

Periya Puranam

The most extensive version of the legend occurs in Sekkilar's text Periya Puranam, composed in the first half of the 12th-century. According to this version, the Jains themselves proposed that they be impaled if defeated by Sambandar. The legend goes like this: the Pandyan king had come under the influence of Jain monks living around the hills of Madurai. This perturbed the queen Mangaiarkkarasi (a former Chola princess) and the minister Kulachirai, who remained staunch Shaivites. The two invited Sambandar to Madurai to counter the Jain monks. The Jains set fire to Sambandar's dwelling, but Sambandar transferred the fire to the king's body in form of a fever. The Jains unsuccessfully tried to cure the king's fever with peacock feathers and mantras. Sambandar then cured the king by applying sacred ash to his body and chanting the Om Namah Shivaya mantra. The Jains then challenged Sambandar to a series of contests, vowing to kill themselves if defeated. In the fire contest, two manuscripts, containing Jain and Shaivite hymns respectively, were thrown into fire. The Jain manuscript burned, while the Shaivite manuscript remained unscathed. In the water contest, the Jain manuscript was carried away by the river, while the Shaivite manuscript came back to the shore undamaged. Finally, Sambandar miraculously cured the king's hunched back, transforming him into a handsome man. The king converted to Shaivism, and the Jains chose to die by impalement on stakes.

Takkayakapparani

Ottakoothar's Takkayakapparani – a war poem – portrays Sambandar as an incarnation of the war god Murugan (Skanda) in verses 6.169–220. Composed after the Nampi version, sometime in the second half of the 12th-century, Sambandhar is depicted in Takkayakapparani as one born on the earth to exterminate the Jains. In this version, Sambandar defeated the Jains in a war-like contest. At the instigation of the child-saint, the Ottakoothar version states that the Pandyan king ordered the Jains to be impaled on stakes. Takkayakapparani describes this as a "sweet tale" narrated by the goddess Sarasvati to Murugan's mother Parvati.

The Thiruvilayadal Puranam similarly states that the king Kunpandyan ordered the killing of 8,000 Jains after his conversion to Shaivism.

== Commemorations ==
The victory of Sambandar over the Jain monks came to be celebrated in some Shaivite temples, including the annual festival at the Meenakshi temple. The impalement of Jains is depicted on the wall frescoes of the Golden Lily Tank of the Meenakshi temple. The stone carvings at the Thiruvedagam Shaivite temple also depict the events from the legend.

== Historicity ==
Scholars question whether this story is a fiction created in the 11th-century, or reflects an actual massacre. Although Sambandar prominently features in the various versions of the legend, his writings do not mention the story. Other contemporary writings in Tamil or other languages do not make mention of the legend. A number of 9th and 10th century Pandyan inscriptions mention the important events from the reigns of the preceding Pandyan kings since the 7th century. However, the alleged massacre of the Jains is not mentioned in any of these inscriptions.

The Jain records do not mention the legend. Even after the alleged massacre, the Jains continued to be concentrated in Madurai during the 8th and the 9th centuries. The Jain authors in Madurai composed several works during this period, including Sendan Divakaram (a Tamil dictionary of Divakara), Neminatham, Vachchamalai and two Tamil grammars by Gunavira Pandita. The Jain authors have not accused Shaivites of any massacre.

Thus, there is no contemporary historical record of an actual massacre having taken place. The legend is first mentioned in the writings of the 11th century Shaivite scholar Nambiyandar Nambi. Subsequently, several versions of the legend appeared in Shaivite texts, such as Sekkilar's Periya Puranam, Ottakoothar's Takkayakapparani and Thiruvilayadal Puranam.

Tamil inscriptions

Champakalakshmi – a scholar of Tamil studies and a historian, in a review of Jain and Hindu epigraphical evidence found over the 19th and 20th-century states that one must consider three evidences to establish the historicity of any alleged Jain-Hindu religious conflict and the alleged impalement of the Jains. These include the literary sources from the relevant period, whether any such events are mentioned in any 7th- to 14th-century inscriptions, and finally whether this can be inferred indirectly from the sudden lack of inscriptions and Jain activity in Tamil region.

Scholars have dismissed the late literary sources with allegations that Jain monks persecuted Sambandar and other Shaiva saints, as well as the impalement of Jain monks as myth and fiction. There are no inscriptions from the period that makes any mention of either. The third evidence, states Champalakshmi, suggests the reverse. Jains continued to thrive in Tamil Nadu through about the 14th-century, get gifts and land grants from the royals and wealthy patrons and create new bas-reliefs, Jinalaya (temples) and Jaina art in rock. The number and frequency of Jain inscriptions actually increased over these centuries. This implies prosperity and freedom of movement, something that would be unlikely if the Jain and the Shaiva communities were violently persecuting and systematically destroying each other. Such epigraphic evidence of a thriving Jain culture midst Tamil people is neither isolated nor distant, but found exactly in the regions where the 12th-century literature alleges that Jains tried to kill Shaiva poet-saints and Shaiva devotees impaled the Jain monks.

According to Champakalakshmi, the same approach to epigraphical evidence suggests that there must have been some great changes in Tamil region and more broadly South India between the 5th- and 7th-century CE when there is sudden and unexplained absence of any new inscriptions. Prior to this period of silence was a period from which many Tamil Brahmi inscriptions in evolving scripts are found in rocky hills of Tamil Nadu, Kerala, Karnataka and Andhra Pradesh. Jain and Hindu inscriptions resume and then increase about and after the 7th-century, but in Tamil and Grantha scripts. The literary evidence nevertheless cannot be completely ignored, states Champakalakshmi. At the least, it implies that the two religious traditions were competing for patronage, that there was a concerted attempt to popularize Shaivism and Hindu temples through a mix of spiritual ideas and Purana-style folklore.

Frescoes in temples

The Pandyan king mentioned in the legend (variously called "Kun Pandya" or "Sundara Pandya") is identified as the 7th century ruler Arikesari Maravarman. Thus, the first mention of the legend dates nearly 500 years after the event supposedly took place. The Meenakshi temple frescoes depicting the event were created only in the 17th century, around a thousand years after the incident.

For all these reasons, a number of scholars doubt the historicity of the incident. Ashim Kumar Roy, in his book A History of the Jainas, concludes that the story was made up by the Saivites to prove their dominance. According to him, such stories of destruction of one sect by another sect were a common feature of the hagiographical Tamil literature, and were used as a way to prove the superiority of one sect over the other. There are stories about a Jain king of Kanchi persecuting the Buddhists in a similar way. Similarly, parallel mythical stories in 11th and 12th-century texts allege persecution of Shaiva Nayanar saints by Jains. On similar grounds, K. A. Nilakanta Sastri argues that the story is "little more than an unpleasant legend and cannot be treated as history".

Paul Dundas writes that the story represents the abandonment of Madurai by Jains for economic reasons or the gradual loss of their political influence. He mentions that alternatively, the massacre is "essentially mythical": the Jains in the Shaivite legend represent the demonic forces while the impalement stakes represent the yupa (the stake of wood used in the Vedic sacrifices). John E. Cort supports this view, stating that "the legend (at some point in the tradition the number of Jains who were impaled got fixed at eight thousand) might well be a representation of the triumph of Agamic Shaivism's triumph over Jain asceticism".

The number of Jain monuments in Madurai District under the protection of the Union Department of Archaeology

- Tiruparankunram.
- Alagarkoil.
- Kilaiyur-Kilavalavu
- Mettupatti
- Uthamapalayam
- Kalluttu.
- Kilakuyilkudi
- Karadipatti.
- Melakuyilkudi

== See also ==
- Tamil Jains
