= Sithalapathy Muktheeswarar Temple =

Religion
- Affiliation: Hinduism
- District: Tiruvarur
- Deity: Lord Shiva

Location
- Location: Sethalapathy in Tiruvarur district
- State: Tamil Nadu
- Country: India
- Interactive map of Sithalapathy Muktheeswarar Temple
- Coordinates: 10°56′38″N 79°38′09″E

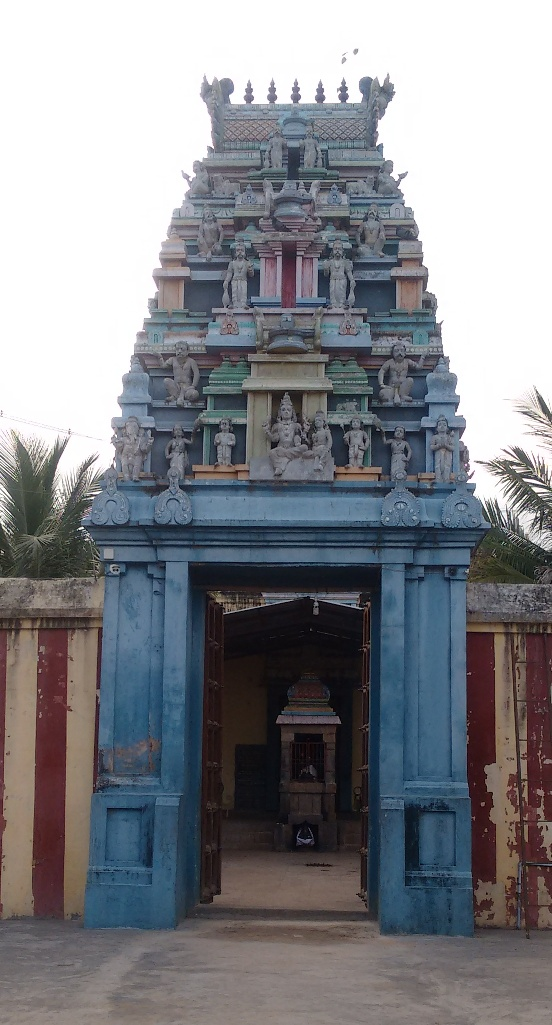
The entrance of the temple

Sithalapathy Muktheeswarar Temple (சிதலப்பதி முத்தீசுவரர் கோயில்])is a Hindu temple located at Sethalapathy in Tiruvarur district, Tamil Nadu, India. The presiding deity is Shiva. He is called as Muktheeswarar. His consort is known as Porkodi Nayagi.

== Significance ==
It is one of the shrines of the 275 Paadal Petra Sthalams - Shiva Sthalams glorified in the early medieval Tevaram poems by Tamil Saivite Nayanar Tirugnanasambandar.

== Literary Mention ==
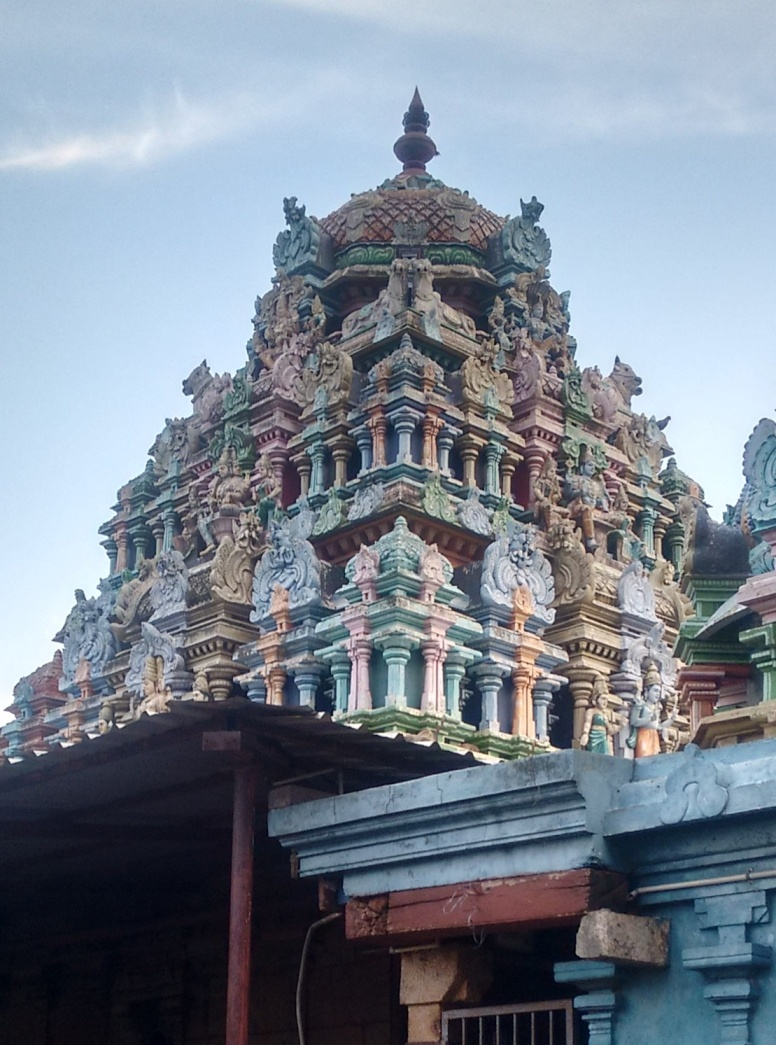
Vimana of the presiding deity

Tirugnanasambandar the feature of the deity as:

புரவியேழும் மணிபூண் டியங்குங்கொடித் தேரினான்

பரவிநின்று வழிபாடு செய்யும்பர மேட்டியூர்
விரவிஞாழல் விரிகோங்கு வேங்கைசுர புன்னைகள்

மரவமவ்வல் மலருந் திலதைம் மதிமுத்தமே.
