= Tiruvalaputhur Manickavannar Temple =

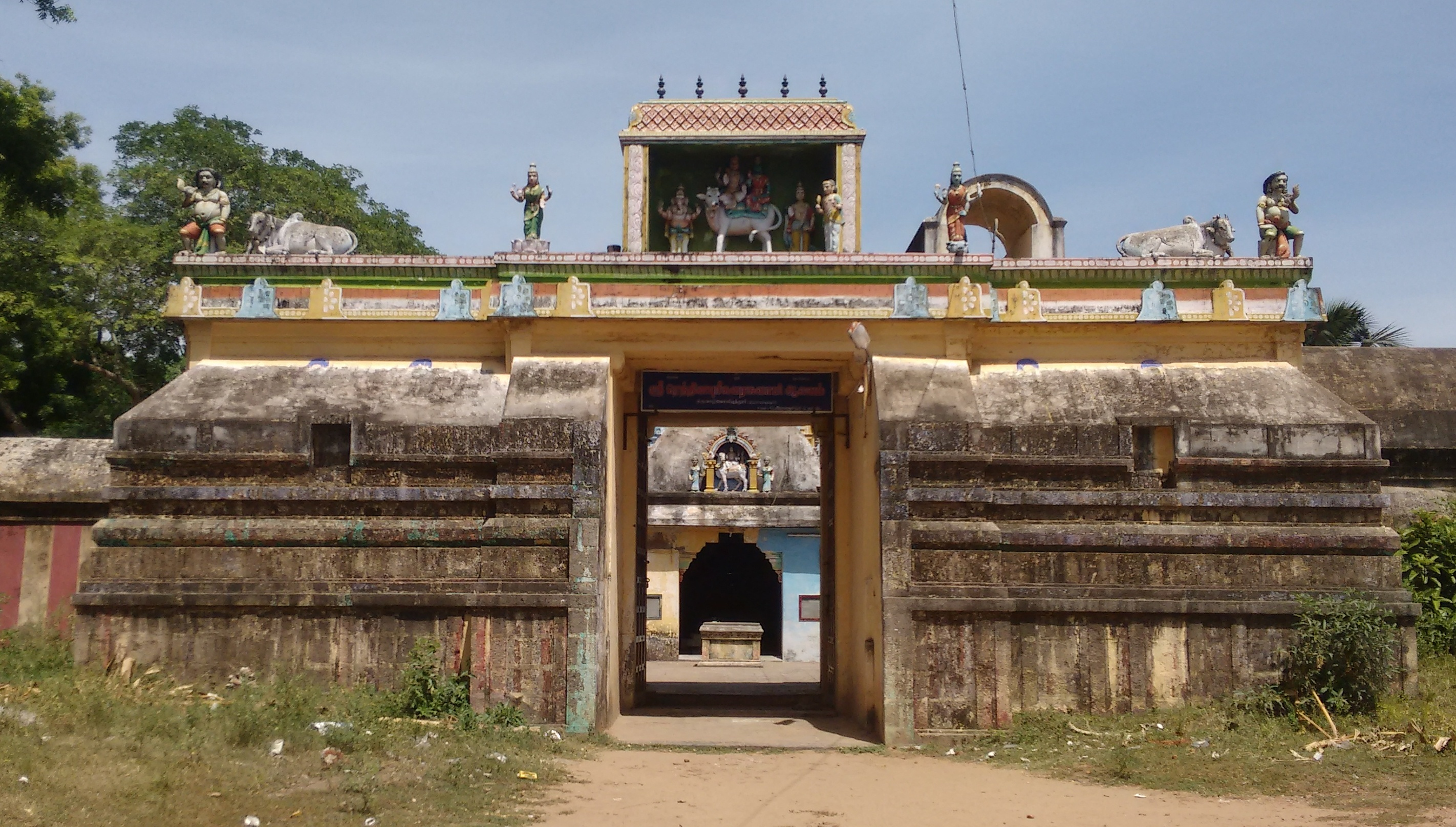
The entrance of the temple

Tiruvalaputhur Manickavannar Temple is a Hindu temple located at Tiruvalaputhur in Mayiladuthurai district of Tamil Nadu, India. The presiding deity is Shiva. He is called as Manicka Vannar and Rathna Pureeswarar. His consort is known as Brama Kunthalambica and Vandar Poonkuzhali.

== Significance ==
It is one of the shrines of the 275 Paadal Petra Sthalams - Shiva Sthalams glorified in the early medieval Tevaram poems by Tamil Saivite Nayanars Tirugnanasambandar and Sundarar.

== Literary mention ==
Tirugnanasambandar describes the feature of the deity as:

பொடியுடைமார்பினர் போர்விடையேறிப் பூதகணம் புடைசூழக்

கொடியுடையூர்திரிந் தையங் கொண்டு பலபலகூறி
வடிவுடைவாணெடுங் கண்ணுமைபாக மாயவன்வாழ்கொளி புத்தூர்க்

கடிகமழ் மாமலரிட்டுக் கறைமிடற்றானடி காண்போம்.
