= Tirunaarayur Soundaryeswarar Temple =

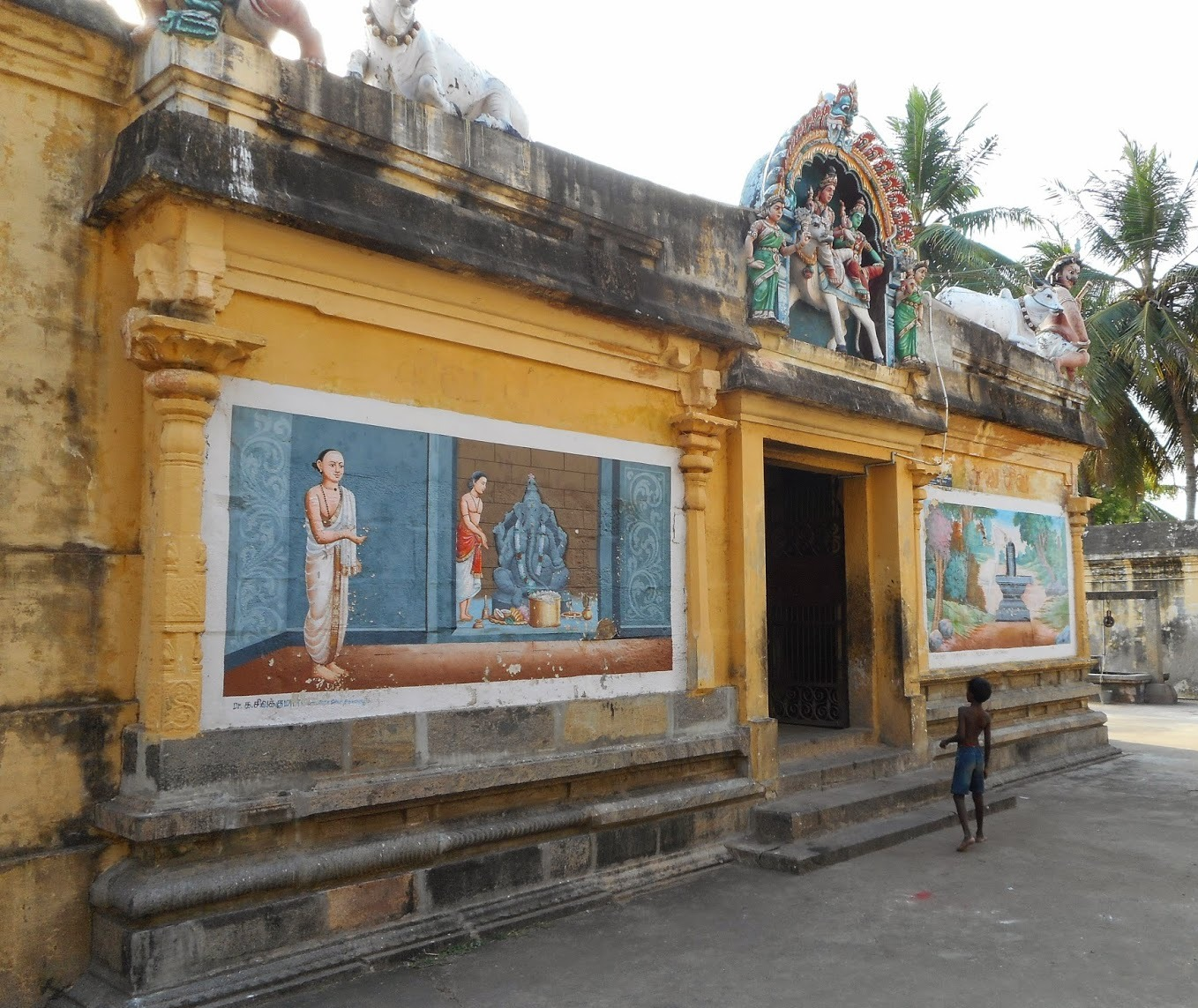
The entrance of the temple

Tirunaarayur Soundaryeswarar Temple is a Hindu temple located at Thirunaraiyur in Cuddalore district of Tamil Nadu, India. The presiding deity is Shiva. He is called as Soundaryeswarar. His consort is known as Tiripurasundari.

== Significance ==
It is one of the shrines of the 275 Paadal Petra Sthalams - Shiva Sthalams glorified in the early medieval Tevaram poems by Tamil Saivite Nayanar Tirugnanasambandar.

This temple is also known for lord Ganesha as polla pillaiyar, and is a swayambhu deity. There is also a legend that mentions that deity has revealed himself to an adolescent Nambiyandar Nambi, whom was sent by his father to offer prashad to the deity.

== Literary mention ==
Tirgnanasambandar describes the feature of the deity as:

வேறுயர் வாழ்வுதன்மை வினைதுக்க மிக்க பகைதீர்க்கு மேய வுடலில்

தேறிய சிந்தைவாய்மை தெளிவிக்க நின்ற கரவைக் கரந்து திகழும்
வேறுயர் பூவின்மேய பெருமானும் மற்றைத் திருமாலு நேட எரியாய்ச்

சீறிய செம்மையாகுஞ் சிவன்மேய செல்வத் திருநாரை யூர்கை தொழவே.
