= Tevaram =

Tamil Hindu text

Topics in Tamil literature
Sangam Literature
Five Great Epics
Silappatikaram	Manimekalai
Civaka Cintamani	Valayapathi
Kundalakesi
Five Minor Epics
Neelakesi	Culamani
Naga Kumara Kaviyam	Udayana Kumara Kaviyam
Yashodhara Kaviyam
Bhakti Literature
Naalayira Divya Prabandham	Kamba Ramayanam
Tevaram	Tirumurai
Tamil people
Sangam	Sangam landscape
Tamil history from Sangam literature	Ancient Tamil music
Religion in ancient Tamilakam

The Tevaram (Tamil: தேவாரம், Tēvāram), also spelled Thevaram, denotes the first seven volumes of the twelve-volume collection Tirumurai, a Shaiva narrative of epic and Puranic heroes, as well as a hagiographic account of early Shaiva saints set in devotional poetry. The Tevaram volumes contain the works of the three most prominent Shaiva Tamil saints of the 7th and 8th centuries: Sambandar, Appar, and Sundarar. The three saints were not only involved in portraying their personal devotion to Shiva, but also engaged a community of believers through their songs. Their work is an important source for understanding the Shaiva Bhakti movement in the early medieval South India.

In the 10th century, during the reign of Rajaraja I of the Chola dynasty, these saints' hymns were collected and arranged by Nambiyandar Nambi. Starting with the Tevaram along with the rest of Tirumurai and ending with the Periya Puranam, Tamil Shaivism acquired a canonical set of sacred texts on ritual, philosophy, and theology. This marked its coming of age alongside the expansion and consolidation of Chola imperial power in the 11th century CE. Tevaram contains 796 hymns made up of 8,284 stanzas. These hymns continue to be devotionally sung in contemporary times in many Shiva temples of Tamil Nadu and other Tamil speaking communities.

== Name ==
The word Tēvāram can be interpreted in two ways. First, as "Tēva" and "Āram" which means "the garland of the lord [Shiva]". Second, as "Tē" and "Vāram" which means "create love towards the lord". (Note: The colonial era literature and some contemporary publications spell Tevaram as Devaram.)

Tevaram has also been interpreted as "private ritual worship", with the term varam appearing in temple inscriptions with the sense of "lord's shrine".

== Date and evolution ==
The Tevaram is attributed to three Tamil Shaiva poet–saints, sometimes referred to as the "Tevaram trio" (Mūvar). They lived between the 6th and 8th century CE, state Peterson and Prentiss, while Champakalakshmi dates them in the 7th to 9th century. They are among the Nayanars (leaders), and considered the "principal saint-leaders" of Tamil Shaivism. Like the ancient Sanskrit texts of India as well as the Vaishnava bhakti tradition, the early Nayanar poetry was largely an oral tradition through the 10th century, with some evidence of these poems being written on palm leaf manuscripts. The actual compilation into Tevaram was completed in the 11th century, starting around 1000 CE. The Tevaram trio themselves credit an older tradition and "speak of saints who lived before them", which states Peterson suggests that parts of the Tevaram poetry may have more ancient roots than the 6th century.

According to Champakalakshmi, there were at least three stages in the evolution of Tevaram: first was the composition of the hymns by the Tevaram trio, then these were adopted in temple rituals and festivals by patikam singers, and thereafter came a conscious 11th-century structuring of these poems into a canonized text. The last stage was assisted by the pontiffs of the mathas (monasteries) who incorporated the hymns into the Shaiva Siddhanta canon in the 13th century.

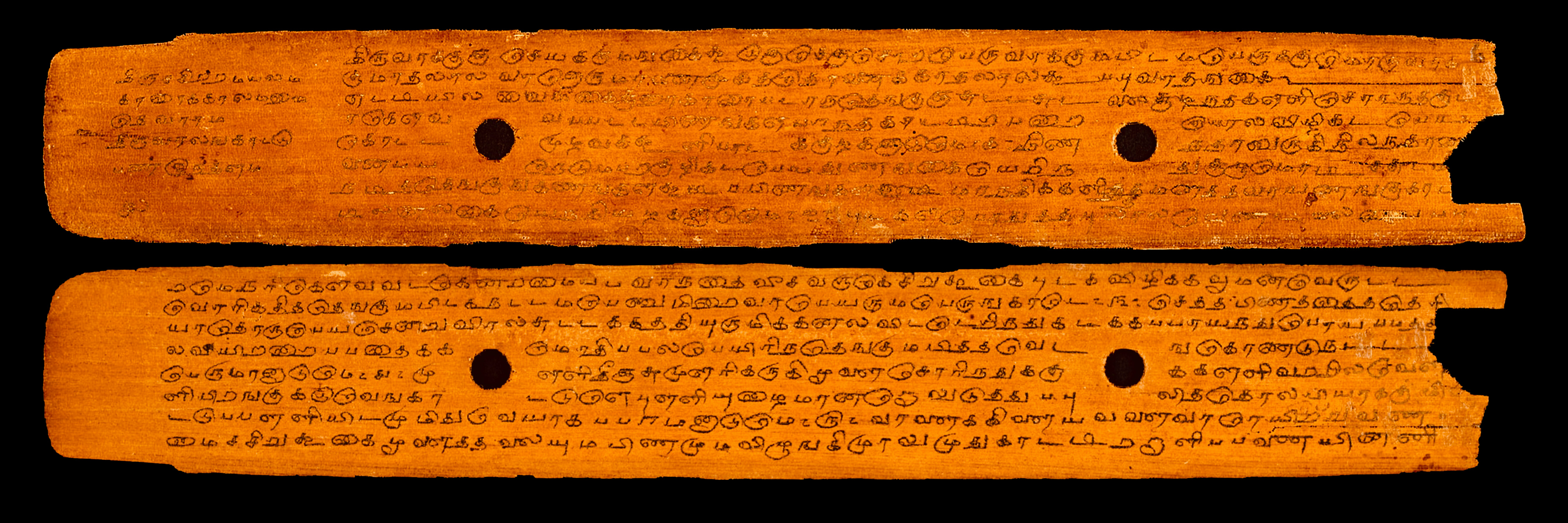
A palm-leaf folio of Tevaram manuscript copied in a Tamil Shiva temple about 1700 CE. The manuscript, like many Hindu texts found in South India, starts with a contents list. The title of the hymns set is in its colophon. The ragam (scale) and talam (beat) are included on the manuscript leaves to guide the singers and musicians. The above set is one of 230 Tevaram folios currently preserved in the British Library.

=== Significance ===
Tevaram text has been called as a Shaiva "Tamil-vētam" (a Tamil Veda) in Volume 4 of the Madras Tamil Lexicon. This equivalence with the ancient Hindu Vedas has been explained by the Tamil Shaiva scholars in that the Tevaram "resembles the Vedic hymns" by being poetry of the "highest order" that also systematically builds the philosophical foundations of Shaivism. It differs from the ancient Vedas in that it focuses on intense bhakti for Shiva.

The Tevaram helped structure a devotional tradition with its own authoritative canon, and thereby negated the primacy of Vedic orthodoxy and Smartha tradition, states Champakalakshmi. Yet they extend rather than reject the Vedic tradition. The hymns, states Peterson, directly praise the four Vedas and Sanskrit, adding that devotion to Shiva is same as these. For example, in Appar VI.301.1, the Tevaram states "See him who is Sanskrit of the North, and southern Tamil, and the four Vedas". Such themes appear repeatedly in this text. Thus, Tevaram is not antagonistic to the Vedic tradition, it compliments and redirects the devotee to bhakti through songs and music, for the same spiritual pursuit. (Note: For a few additional examples (Translator: V.M.Subramanya Ayyar), see: Tevaram I.24.10: "the god in kāḻi who pressed down angrily by gently fixing his toe to crush the arakkaṉ who lifted (the mountain), the pure one who smears the ash which is dust, took pity (on him) as he began to praise god by singing Sama Veda (cāma vētam);" Tevaram I.52.1: "one who dwells in Neṭuṅkaḷam, you who have the Vedas (Vetams) as your word! whose dress is a skin! who has on his long caṭai a prospering crescent! unless people praise you in the above mentioned manner; you do not mind the faults of people who have defects; weed out the affliction of those who have moral firmness and who are superior by their principles.;" Tevaram V.30.6: "(My mind!) worship with folded hands sincerely early in life, Shiva (Civaṉ) who chants the four Vedas (Vētams) which contain good things, who receives alms in the teethless white skull, who is in tillai (citamparam), and the god who is in parāittuṟai in the south; Tevaram VII.69.9: "God well-versed in Vedic love who destroyed the precious life of the Kālaṉ (God of death) who came without any regard, to bind by the noose Markaṇṭeyaṉ the bachelor who fell prostrate at the feet of Shiva (Civaṉ) with flowers from which fragrance was spreading, with the leg! the god in Tirumullaivāyil of great wealth! the spiritual preceptor who gave out the meanings of the Vedas (Vētams) which are eternal; root out the sufferings that I your slave have to undergo.)

In their structure and focus, the patikams (praise poem) of the Tevaram are "closely associated with early Sanskrit strotas" of the types found in Bhagavad Gita, the Bharavi, some compositions of Kalidasa and some chapters of the epic Mahabharata, all dated between about the 2nd century BCE and the 5th century CE, states Peterson. The melodic prosody, structure and genre that the Tevaram exemplifies has roots and illustrations in the Satarudriya of the Yajurveda, an ancient prototypical devotional hymn to Rudra-Shiva.

According to Sabaratnam, the Tevaram verses were more oriented towards the folk tradition. It used the Tamil language and thus set aside the primacy of Sanskrit liturgies in religious matters. Tevaram made the direct devotion to Shiva more easily accessible to the people.

== Saints ==
The first three volumes of Tevaram are by Sambandar, the next three by Appar, and the seventh by Sundarar. Appar and Sambandar lived around the 7th century, while Sundarar lived in the 8th century. (Note: There is some disagreement on the centuries, with Champakalakshmi dating Sundarar in 8th to 9th-century.) It is likely that the lives of Appar and Sambandar overlapped sometime between 570 and 670 CE, while Sundarar lived in late 7th or the early 8th century. All three are among the 63 Nayanars (lit. 'hounds of Siva') who are revered poet-saints of Shaivism. During the Pallava period these three travelled extensively around Tamil Nadu, pioneering the tradition of an emotional devotion to Shiva through ritual singing in temples and public places. This was an era where Hindus, Jains and Buddhists were rivals in seeking patronage and influence in royal and urban circles of South India.

The Tevaram includes 383 or 384 hymns composed by Sambandar over volumes I–III, 313 hymns by Appar over volumes IV–VI, and 100 hymns by Sundarar in volume VII. Information about Tevaram Trio comes mainly from the Periya Puranam, the eleventh-century Tamil book on the Nayanars that forms the last volume of the Tirumurai. The first two Saints are mentioned in the third poet Sundarar's Tiruttondartokai (lit. The List of the Holy Servants) and other poetry which is generally dated to the 8th century. Other Tamil texts such as the Tiruvilaiyatarpuranam provide more extended context for the life stories of the Tevaram trio and other poet-saints. All these texts including the Periya Puranam were finalized a few centuries later.

The texts about the Tevaram trio are hagiographies full of mythistory where devotion leads to miracles, objects float upstream in a river, cruel Jains of the Chola kingdom repeatedly scheme to hurt and kill peaceful Shaiva saints in the Pandya kingdom, the Shiva devotees survive and thrive through divine interventions, magic cures people's diseases, stone statues spring to life to help the kind and gentle Shaiva people suffering persecution, gigantic forms of living animals such as cruel elephants become small peaceful stone statues, and other such events happen in the context of loving and intense devotion to Shiva. (Note: The Periya Puranam recites numerous examples of Jain monks allegedly destroying Shiva temples, persecuting Shaiva people and torturing Shaiva poet-saints. Example quotes: "How long this joint tour took, one cannot say; but much must have been said by Appar to Sambandhar about the cruel supremacy of Jainism and of the various forms of tortures he suffered at the hands of the Jain monks"; "The aged Appar, still bearing the indelible scars of the scourgings and other forms of torture by the Jain monks, was scared for the safety of the Child and tried to dissuade him from his resolve to go to Madurai.") This myth-filled context has created much controversy and speculations on their reliability, even the centuries in which these saints lived.

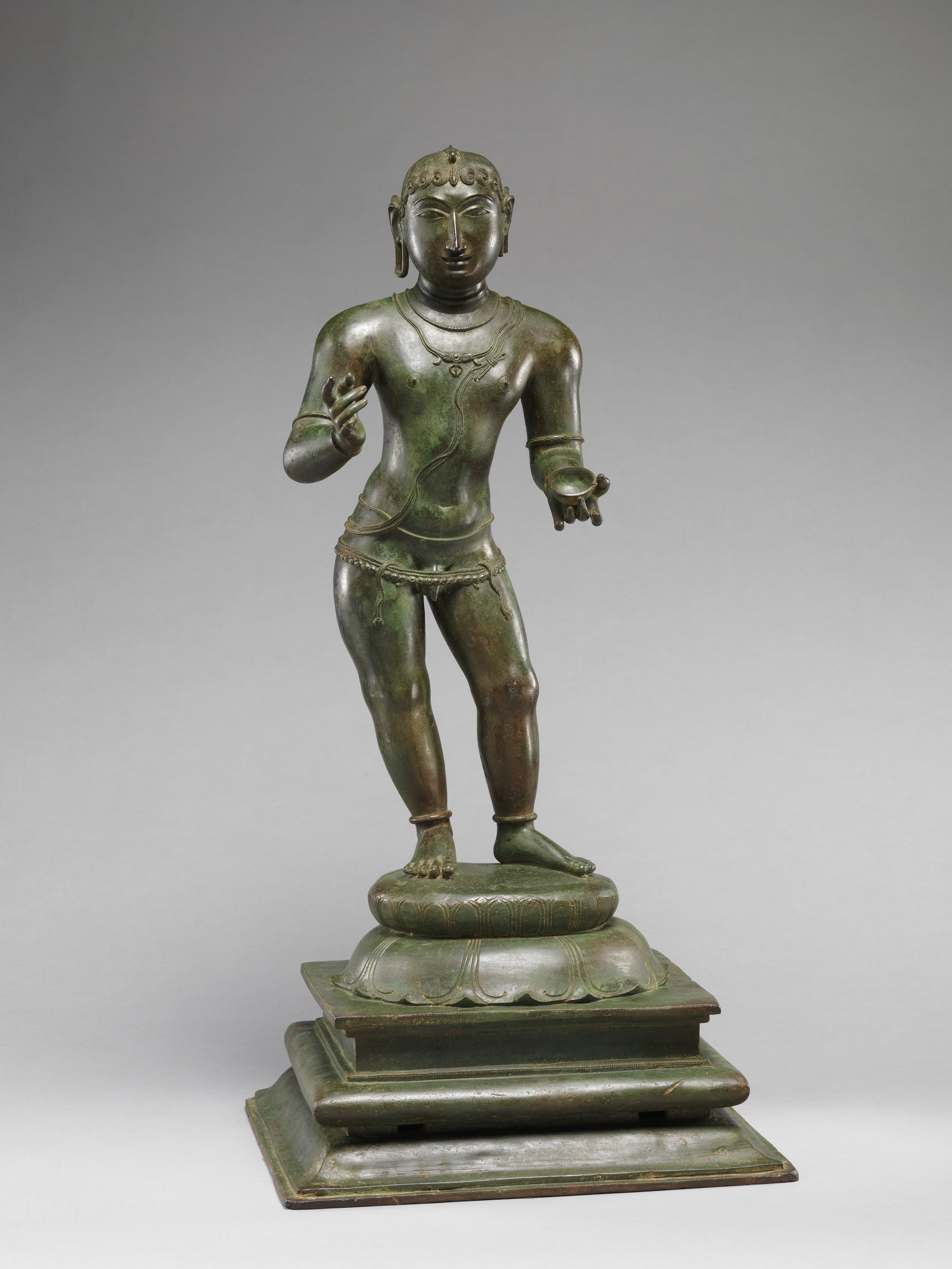
A copper alloy statue depicting Sambandar, late 11th century

=== Sambandar ===
Thirugnana Sambandar, sometimes spelled as Campantar or Ñāṉacampantar, was born into a family of Shaiva Brahmins in Sirkazhi near Mayiladuthurai in Mayiladuthurai District. Little is known with any certainty about Sambandar actual life. The last hymns of Tevaram volume III provide some information. The Periya Puranam and Sundarar's Tiruttondartokai are additional early records and provide a comprehensive hagiography on him. Other sources are the Nambiyandar Nambi's Tiru Tondar Tiruvandadi and a few inscriptions in Tamil Shiva temples about patikam singers that can be dated around the 9th century.

In the Periya Puranam, Sambandar is said to have been a child prodigy, one who began composing hymns as soon as he started speaking as a baby and who mastered the Vedas by age three. His gifts were attributed to being breastfed by the Shakti goddess Umadevi. As a child poet-saint, he attracted throngs of audiences, travelled through Tamil lands to Shiva temples accompanied by musician Tirunilakantayalppanar, composing melodious hymns in complex meters and rhythms. The hymn III.345 of Tevaram depicts Jain monks persecuting him and trying to burn a palm-leaf manuscript of his hymn, but the fire does not burn it.

On the request of queen Mangayarkkarasiyar, Sambandar went to Madurai to counter the Jain monks in her husband's court. There the Jain monks allegedly attempt to burn the house he was staying in, but he remains unharmed. Then he is challenged to a debate by the Jain monks with the condition that the losing side convert to the winning side, or commit suicide by impaling themselves to death. Sambandar defeats the monks in debate, the Pandya king and some Jains convert to Shaivism. Other Jain monks die in Madurai of impalement in the aftermath. Sambandar died around 655 CE at the age of 16, on the day of his wedding when Shiva met him and took his relatives and him to his abode.

The first three volumes of the Tirumurai contain 383 poems (some editions 384), composed of 4,181 stanzas, attributed to Sambandar, which are all that survive out of a reputed oeuvre of 16,000 hymns. His verses were set to tune on yal or lute by Sambandar's constant companion Tiru Nilakanta Yazhpanar (Nilakantaperumanar).

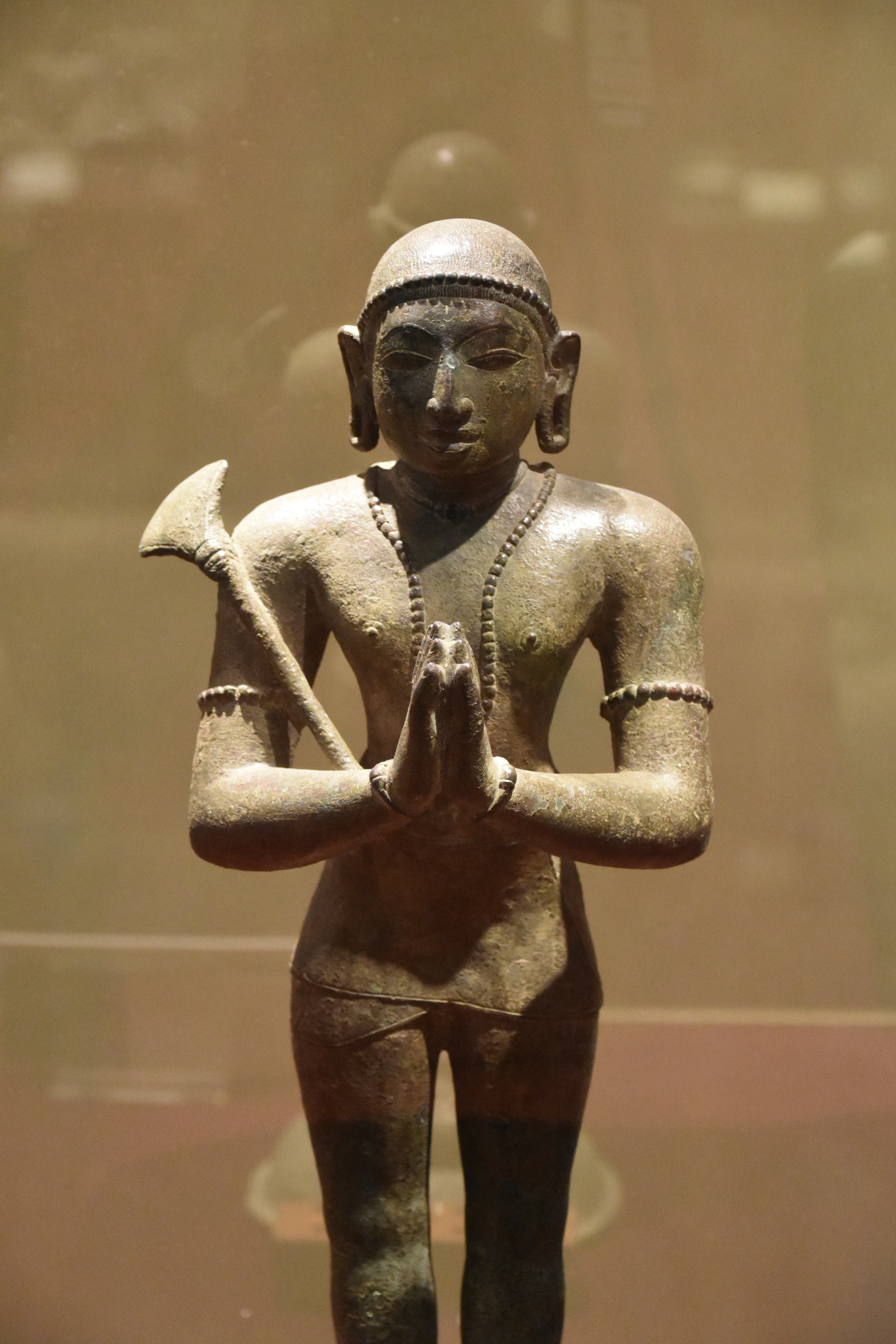
Appar depicted in bronze, 12th century

=== Appar ===
Appar, also known as Tirunavukkaracar, was born in the late 6th century or the early 7th century in a Vellala peasant family. From the Shaiva Shudra caste, he was an orphan raised by his sister. (Note: Vellala were among the traditional tillers, agriculture labor; classified as Shudra.) He spent his childhood in Tiruvamur village near Atikai by most accounts. His childhood name was Marunikkiyar (Marulneekiar). Zvelebil dates his birth to between 570–596 CE. Details of Appar's life are found in his own hymns and in Sekkizhar's Periya Puranam. His sister Thilagavathiar was betrothed to a military commander who died in war. She devoted herself to Shaivism.

Unlike his sister, Appar turned to Jainism. He left home, joined a Jain monastery, where he was renamed Dharmasena (Tarumacenar). He studied Jainism and became the head of the Jain monastery in Tiruppatirippuliyur. After a while, afflicted by a painful stomach illness, Dharmasena returned home. His sister gave him Tirunuru (sacred ash) and the five syllable mantra "namaccivaya" (Namah Shivaya). Then together they went together to a Shiva temple in Atikai, where he spontaneously composed his first hymn of Tevaram. As he sang the second verse, he was miraculously cured of his stomach illness. Thereafter, he came to be known as Navukkaracar (from Skt: Vagisa, "king of speech") or more popularly just Appar. He had thus left Jainism, and become a devout Shaiva.

Appar's hymn are intimately devotional to Shiva, but occasionally include verses where he repents the Jain period of his life. In Tevaram hymn IV.39 and others, he criticizes the Jain monastic practice of not brushing teeth, the lack of body hygiene, their barbaric ascetic practices, the doctrine of pallurai (anekantavada) as self-contradictory relativism, the hypocrisy of running away from the world and work yet begging for food in that same world, and others.

The Tamil hagiographies allege that Jain monks approached the Pallava king Mahendravarman to take revenge on Appar for his desertion. Appar is summoned to the court and allegedly tortured. Appar remains in good spirit despite the persecution. Thus, Appar persuaded Mahendravarman of the folly in Jainism, and converted the king to Shaivism.

Appar was a dedicated pilgrim, who travelled to distant Shiva shrines. Of particular note are Shiva temples sites that were important turning points to his life and these remain important to contemporary Tamil Shaivas. These include Tunkanaimatam, Chidambaram, Sirkazhi where he met the child poet-saint Sambandar who lovingly called him Appar (transl. father). Other Appar destinations mentioned in the Tevaram include Nallur, Tinkalur, Tiruvarur, Tiruvavatuturai where he described the Tiruvatirai festival, Maraikkatu, Vaymur, Tiruvaiyaru, and mount Kailash in the Himalayan north. This was also a period of resurrection of the smaller Shiva temples. Appar sanctified all these temples with his verses and was also involved in cleaning of the dilapidated temples in a ritual known as uzhavaarappani. Appar is believed to have died around the age of 81 in Tirupugalur. He extolled Shiva in 4,900 stanzas, out of which 3,130 have survived. These are compiled in the fourth, fifth, and sixth volumes of the Tirumurai.

=== Sundarar ===
Sundarar, also known as Nampi Arurar or Cuntaramurtti or Cuntarar, is the third of the Tevaram trio. His Tevaram hymns provide more biographical specifics than the hymns of Sambandar and Appar. Sundarar was born in Tirunavalur in a Shaiva Brahmin family to Sadaiya Nayanar and Isaignaniyar towards the end of the 7th century. He was adopted by the Pallava feudatory family of Naracinka Munaiyaraiyar, an adoption that gave him a luxurious childhood and the last name "Arurar" after Shiva in Tiruvarur. As he grew into an adult in Tiruvarur, he was called "Sundarar" meaning "the handsome lord".

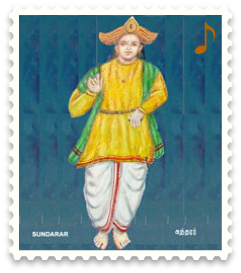
Sundarar

His life and his hymns in the Tevaram are broadly grouped in four stages. First, his cancelled arranged marriage through the intervention of Shiva in the form of a mad petitioner and his conversion into a Shaiva devotee. Second, his double marriage to temple dancers Paravai and Cankali with their stay together in Tiruvarur. Third, his blindness and then return of his sight. Finally, his reflections on wealth and material goods.

In the first part of his life, the arranged marriage of Sundarar is cancelled after a mad old man mysteriously appears and produces a palm leaf document. The document stated that Sundarar was bonded to serve him, his master. A court of elders then reviews the document and finds it authentic, demands Sundarar to serve the petitioner, who then mysteriously vanishes into Shiva shrine. Sundarar views this as a command to serve Shiva in the Tiruvarur temple. Later he meets dancer Paravai, they marry, and together they serve the Shaiva pilgrims and take care of the temple duties. He goes to visit Tiruvorriyur, meets and is enamoured with Cankali. With the help of Shiva, this leads to Sundarar's second marriage, but only after his wedding vows include never leaving Cankali and Tiruvorriyur. Sundarar misses his first wife Paravai, does not keep his word, and leaves for Tiruvarur. The broken vow causes him to go blind before he reaches Tiruvarur. His suffering thereafter are part of several Tevaram hymns. As a blind man, he visits many Shiva shrines and sings there. Slowly in stages, he becomes closer to Shiva and recovers his sight.

Sundarar with restored eyesight then lives with his two wives. In his later hymns, he presents his spiritual discussions with Shiva on how to achieve both spiritual succor and material wealth in life. He seeks the latter to provide for his family and to pay for the charitable temple kitchen that fed hundreds of Shaiva pilgrims. Shiva becomes his patron king, grants him grain, gold and a flashing sword. This is embedded symbolism to inspire regional kings and wealthy patrons to support the spiritual and charitable works at Shiva temples.

Sundarar is the author of 1,026 poems compiled as the Tirumurai's seventh volume.

== The hymns ==
Om symbol Tirumurai Om symbol in Tamil
The twelve volumes of Tamil Śaiva hymns of the sixty-three Nayanars
Parts	Name	Author
1,2,3	(Tevaram) Thirukkadaik Kaappu	Sambandar
4,5,6	Tevaram	Thirunavukkarasar
7	(Tevaram) Thiruppattu	Sundarar
8	Thiruvasakam & Thirukkovaiyar	Manickavasagar
9	Thiruvisaippa & Thirupallandu	Various
10	Thirumandhiram	Thirumular
11	Saiva Prabandham	Various
12	Periya Puranam	Sekkizhar
Paadal Petra Sthalam
Paadal Petra Sthalam
Rajaraja I
Nambiyandar Nambi

The Tevaram has 796 hymns. Each hymn contains pathikam (Tamil: பதிகம்), also spelled patikam (from Sanskrit padya, verses). Predominantly all hymns of Tevaram contain ten or eleven verses. Each verse is a four line melodic stanza with an embedded refrain. The hymns of Sambandar and Sundarar also embed a signature or coda in the last verse, where the poet-saint shares some personal information, or the benefits of listening to or singing that hymn, or the context of that hymn. The hymns of Appar too include a signature or coda in the last verse, but they characteristically are linked to the Ramayana through Ravana's mythical devotion before he lost his way and turned evil.

The hymns are set to music denoted by panns with a ragam and talam. The traditional manuscripts arrange the hymns according to musical modes, or panmurai. The Tevaram hymns are set to 23 of the 103 pan scale modes of Ancient Tamil music, and they are meant to be sung while accompanied with a stringed musical instrument such as the Tamil yal. Professional singing of the Tevaram hymns at large Shiva temples has been a Tamil tradition since at least the 11th century.

Several of these poems refer to historic references pointing to the saints own life, voice of devotee persona, using interior language of the mystic. Of the three, Sambandar's life is better interpreted by his verses. According to Zvelebil, the child-prodigy Sambandar's lyrics are characterized by egocentricism, by militancy and great ardour, by a warm feeling for the greatness and beauty of Tamil language with scholarly experimentation in meters showing familiarity with Sanskrit forms. Zvelebil quotes a current Tamil saying, "My Appar sang of me, Sambandar sang of himself, Sundarar sang of women". The lyrical beauty of the original Tamil verses is often untranslatable into English.

Sisir Kumar Das regards this poem by Sambandar as exemplifying the structural and thematic distinctiveness of bhakti poetry:

In the temple where he is throned, who bids us not lose heart
In the hour when our senses grow confused, the way grows dim,
Our wisdom fails, and mucus chokes our struggling breath,
In Tiruvaiyar, where the girls dance around, and the drumbeats sound,
The monkeys fear the rain, run up the trees, and scan the clouds.
– Sambandar

Appar's poems are emotional, very personal form of Shiva worship. The metaphors used in the poems have deep agrarian influence that is considered one of the striking chords for common people to get accustomed to the verse. The quote below is a popular song of Appar glorifying Shiva in simple diction:

மாசில் வீணையும் மாலை மதியமும்
வீசு தென்றலும் வீங்கிள வேனிலும்
மூசு வண்டறை பொய்கையும் போன்றதே
ஈசன் எந்தை இணையடி நீழலே

Translation:

like the sweet-sounding Veena and cool night's moon,
like the gently breeze and the young spring
like a bee-humming lake
are my lord's twin feet's shadow
– Appar

Like Sambandar, there is a call for self-independence, militancy or pressing for one's rights, without fearing anyone in Appar compositions:

To none are we subject! Death we do not fear!
We do not grieve in hell.
No tremblings know we, and no illnesses.
It's joy for us, joy day by day, for we are His.
Forever His, His; who does reign, our Sankara, in bliss.
– Appar (Translator: Zvelebil)

Sundarar's hymns had a touch of humour. In one of the verses, he playfully draws an analogy between Shiva and himself, both having two wives and the needs of nagging wives:

Thou art half woman. Thyself
Ganga is in thy long hair,
Full well canst thou comprehend
Burden of woman so fair
– Sundarar

Early Shaiva Siddhanta

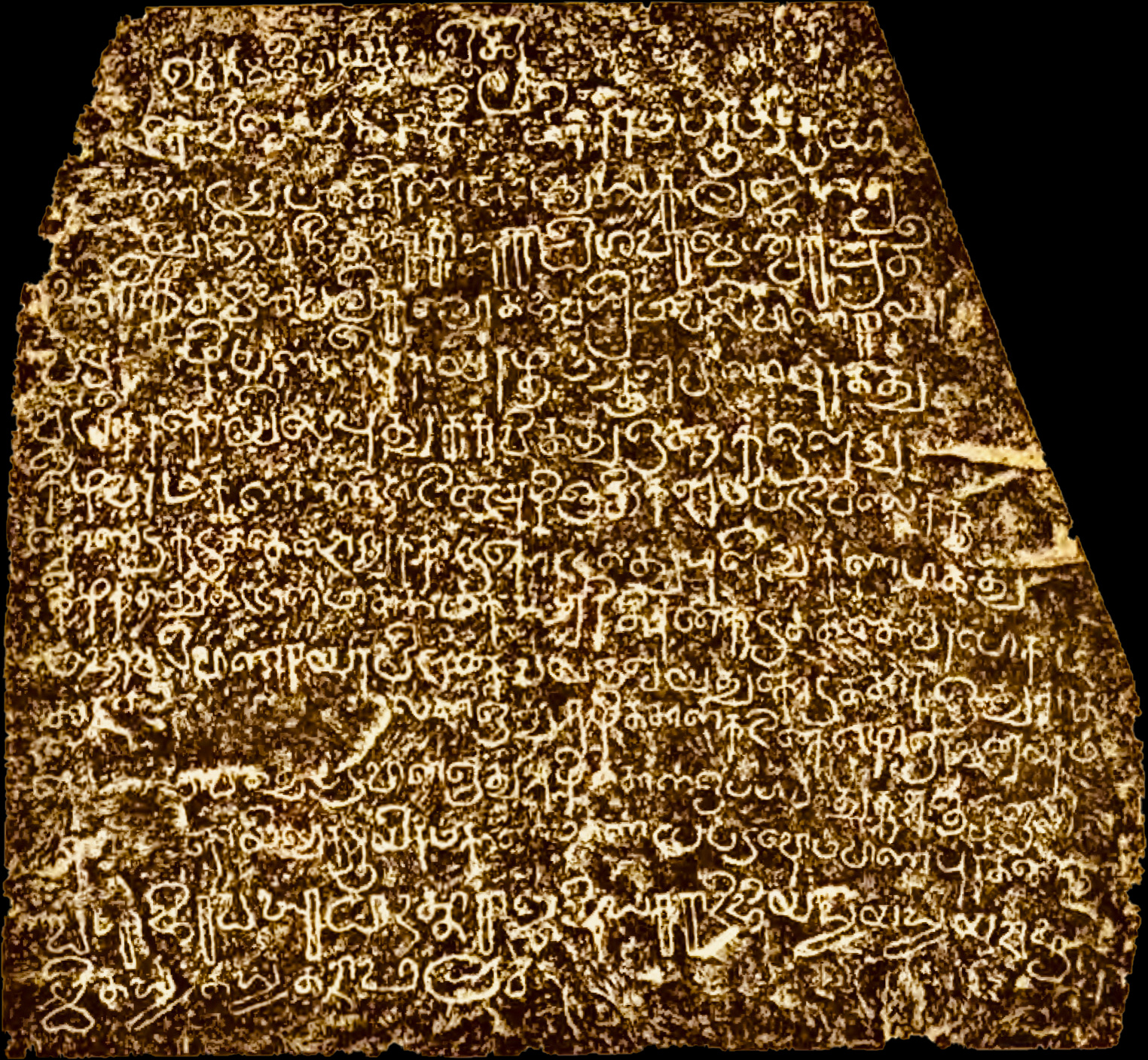
One of the earliest mentions of Tevaram singers is found in the 8th century Nandivarman II Tiruvallam inscription on the north wall of Vilwanatheswarar temple (line 32). Above is a portion of early Tiruvallam inscriptions (Tamil and Sanskrit languages, Tamil and Grantha scripts).

The hymns provide a window into the types of Shiva temples in the 7th century CE, artwork and the iconography prevalent then. They confirm that the iconography of Nataraja – the dancing form of Shiva, and the Shiva linga, were already well established by the time of Sambandar, complementing each other in large Shiva temples. These hymns also provide evidence of the Shaiva poet-saints cherishing the Vedic heritage.

His house is resplendent with five walls,
with gleaming gopuras in each direction to the number of the Vedas,
with five halls, which are the sheaths of the Brahman,
food and the others with the holy waters,
and with the shrines of the Blessed Mulasthana,
Devi, Visnu, Elephant-faced Vinayaka and Skanda,
Him who constantly performs His dance, there is Sheath of Bliss,
Whose foot is curved, I worship.
– Sambandar (Translator: Smith)

The Tevaram hymns celebrate charitable giving (danam), food to pilgrims (anna), devotional singing at temples. The inscriptions found in stone temples of Shiva over the centuries, confirm that this became a lasting historic practice by at least the 8th century CE. For example, states Dorai Rangaswamy, the Nandivarman II (Pallavamalla) inscription of the 8th century confirms Tevaram hymns singing at a Shiva temple. Another inscription attributed to Vijayanandi Vikramavarma from the 9th century makes provision for singers of Patiyams in the temple. Similarly, two 10th-century donor inscription of Uttama Cola, who preceded Rajaraja, mentions Shaiva hymn singers. (Note: Many more inscriptions over the centuries mention Tevaram singers in Shiva temples. For example, SII inscription 433 of 1903, 423 of 1908, 624 of 1909, 349 of 1918, 129 of 1924, 99 of 1989, 149 of 1937, and others.)

Pilgrimage sites

The Tevaram hymns incorporate names of Shiva temple pilgrimage sites. The poems also involved glorifying the feat of Shiva in the particular location. These hymns helped create a sacred geography of Tamil Shaivism, interconnecting this regional Shaiva community within and to the broader Shaivism across the Indian subcontinent. The poems do not represent social space as a contested space, rather they were spaces for sharing of religious ideas, movement and social service to pilgrims. According to Prentiss, the hymns show that the hymnists were free to wander and to offer their praise of Shiva. The emotional intensity of the hymns represent spontaneous expression of thought as an emotional responses to God.

The Paadal Petra Sthalams are 275 temples that are revered in the verses of Tevaram and are amongst the greatest Shiva temples of the continent, while the Vaippu Sthalam are places that are mentioned casually in the hymns. The focus of the hymns suggests darshan (seeing and being seen by God) within the puja (worship) offering. Both human structures and natural places find a mention in Tevaram: in addition to temples, the hymnists make classificatory lists of places like katu (forest), turai (port or refuge), kulam (water tank) and kalam (field).

== Compilation ==
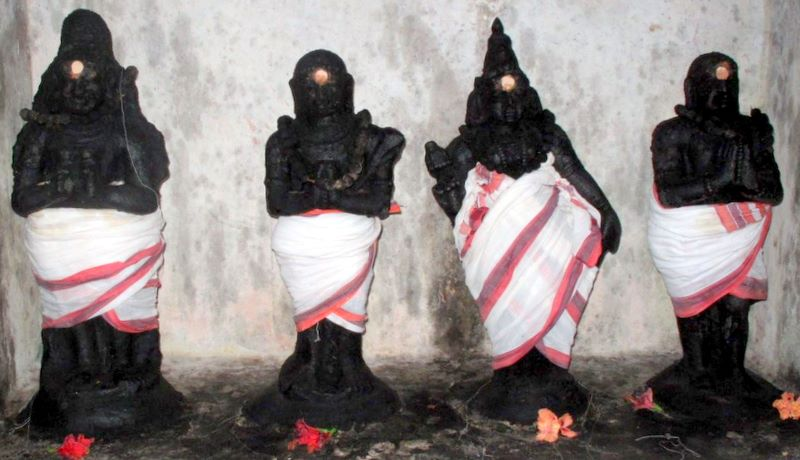
The 3 foremost Nayanars with Manikkavasakar - collectively called the Naalvar: (from left) Sambandar, Tirunavukkarasar, Sundarar, Manikkavacakar.

Raja Raja Chola I (985-1013 CE) embarked on a mission to recover the hymns after hearing short excerpts of Tevaram in his court. He sought the help of Nambi Andar Nambi, who was a priest in a temple. It is believed that by divine intervention Nambi found the presence of scripts, in the form of cadijam leaves half eaten by white ants in a chamber inside the second precinct of the Chidambaram Nataraja temple. The brahmanas (Dikshitars) in the temple opposed the mission, but Rajaraja intervened by consecrating the images of the saints through the streets of Chidambaram. Rajaraja thus became known as Tirumurai Kanda Cholan meaning "one who saved the Tirumurai". Thus far Shiva temples only had images of god forms, but after the advent of Rajaraja, the images of the Nayanar saints were also placed inside the temple.

Nambi arranged the hymns of three saints Sambandar, Appar and Sundarar as the first seven books, Manikkavacakar's Tirukovayar and Tiruvacakam as the eighth book, the 28 hymns of nine other saints as the ninth book, the Tirumandiram of Tirumular as the tenth book, and 40 hymns by 12 other saints, Tirutotanar Tiruvanthathi–the sacred anthathi of the labours of the 63 Nayanar saints–and Nambi's own hymns as the eleventh book. The first seven books were later called as Tevaram, and the whole Shaiva canon, which came to include Sekkizhar's Periya Puranam (1135 CE) as the twelfth volume, is wholly known as Tirumurai, "the holy book". Thus Shaiva literature which covers about 600 years of religious, philosophical and literary development.

Nambi was also involved in setting musical modes for Tevaram. He accomplished this by visiting the native village of Tiru Nilakanta Yazhpanar, where he met a woman of the Tamil Panar caste who learned the mode of divine revelation. She returned to Chidambaram with Nambi, where she sang and danced for Shiva.

In 1918, 11 more songs were found engraved in stone temple in Tiruvidavayil in a village close to Nannilam, and it was the first instance found where Tevaram verses were found in inscriptions.

== In culture ==
Tevaram was one of the sole reasons for converting Vedic ritual to Agamic puja followed in Shiva temples. Though these two systems are overlapping, the Agamic tradition ensures the perpetuation of the Vedic religion's emphasis on the efficacy of ritual as per Davis.

The earliest singers of Tevaram hymns were referred to as pidarars, and were among the Tirupadiyam Vinnapam Seyvar that Nandivarman III provided for in Tiruvallam Bilavaneswara temple records dating from the 8th century. A few earlier records also give details about the gifts rendered to the singers of Tevaram from Parantaka I. Rajaraja deputed 48 pidarars and made liberal provisions for their maintenance and successors. A record belonging to Rajendra I mentions Tevaranayakan, the supervisor of Tevaram and shows the institutionalisation of Tevaram with the establishment of a department. There are records from Kulothunga Chola III from Nallanyanar temple in South Arcot indicating singing of Tiruvempavai and Tiruvalam of Manikkavacakar during special occasion in the temple. From the 13th century, the texts were passed on to the odhuvars by the adheenams and there was no more control by the kings or the brahmanas. The odhuvars were from the vellala community and were trained in ritual singing in Tevaram schools.

Today, odhuvars, sthanikars, or kattalaiyars offer musical programmes in Shiva temples of Tamil Nadu by singing Tevaram after the daily rituals. These are usually carried out as a chorus programme soon after the divine offering. The singing of Tevaram is followed by musicals from the music pillars in such temples like Madurai Meenakshi Amman Temple, Nellaiappar Temple and Thanumalayan Temple.

Periya Puranam, the eleventh-century Tamil book on the Nayanars that forms the last volume of the Tirumurai, primarily had references only to Tevaram and subsequently expanded to 12 parts. One of the first anthologies of Sambandar, Appar, and Sundarar's hymns, the Tevara Arulmuraitirattu, is linked to Tamil Shaiva Siddhantha philosophy by grouping ninety-nine verses into 10 categories. The category headings are God, soul, bond, grace, guru, methodology, enlightenment, bliss, mantra and liberation–corresponding to Umapathi Shivachariyar's work Tiruvarutpayan. Tirumurai Kanda Puranam is another anthology for Tirumurai as a whole, but primarily focuses on Tevaram. It is the first of the works to refer the collection of volumes as Tirumurai.
