= Narasinga Muniyaraiyar Nayanar =

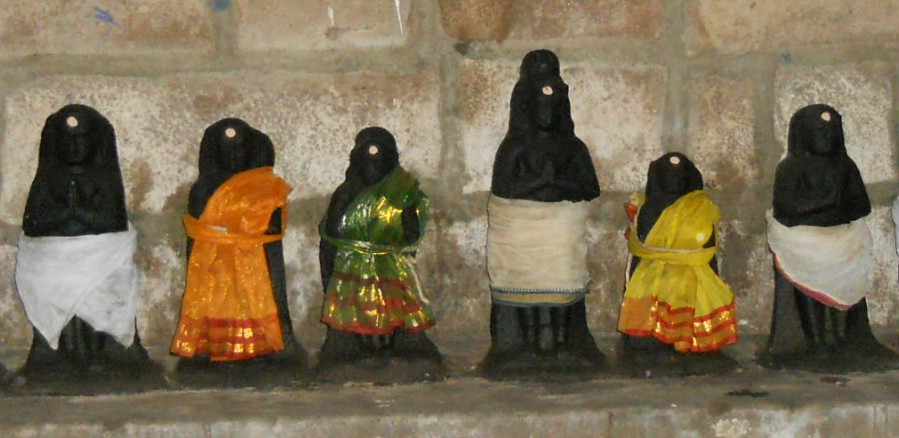
Family of Sundarar (l->r): Sadaya Nayanar (father), Isaignaniyar (mother), Paravai Nachiyar (wife), Sundarar, Sangili Nachiyar (wife), Narasinga Muniyaraiyar (foster-father).

Narasinga Muniyaraiyar Nayanar is the 40th Nayanar saint. He was a devotee of Lord Shiva and an advocate of Shaivism.Traditional hagiographies like Periya Puranam (13th century CE) and Thiruthondar Thogai (10th century CE) detail his legendary life and services to the Hindu god Shiva.Narasinga Muniyaraiyar Nayanar was the chieftain of the state Tiru Munaipadi.Muniyaraiyar The saint was a contemporary of Sundarar.

== Hagiography ==
Narasinga Muniyaraiyar Nayanar was the chieftain of the state Tiru Munaipadi. Muniyaraiyar The saint was a contemporary of Sundarar. Swami Sadananda points out that Sundarar lived few generations after Sambandar and Thirunavukkarasar. It is also learnt that the saint lived at Tirunavalur (Tirunamanullur), Narasinga Muniyaraiyar was the foster-father of Sundarar. The saint brought up Sundarar as a prince.

The chieftain was the great devotee of Shiva and people were happy during his reign. He would arrange special pujas at Shiva temples on each Thiruvathirai star day (Ardra (nakshatra)). On this eve he was receiving Saiva devotees. The devotees used to smear with holy ashes on their bodies. On the Puja eve the devotees were fed sumptuously with royal feast. At the end of the feast he was donating more than one hundred gold coins to each devotee.

There was a testing day for the chieftain. God has chosen the specific day to reveal the faith and devotion of Narasinga Muniyaraiyar. On one such Thiruvathirai puja day, a devotee attended puja with holy ashes smeared on his plain naked body. His presence gave rise to unusual perturbation among other devotees. Instead of developing detestation at the nudity, Muniyaraiyar rightly understood the amount of self-control and attitude of detachment developed by the devotee within himself. He gave the respectful welcome by prostrating before the saint and served the royal banquet with full of hospitality. The chieftain also extended 200 gold coins to the devotee. The reverence and respect shown by Narasinga Muniyaraiyar earned the benign grace of Shiva and the saint was liberated from the cycle of rebirth.

Tamil month Purattasi – Sadayam star Shatabhishak or Shatataraka is widely celebrated as Guru Puja Day of Narasinga Muniyaraiyar Nayanar.
