= Samanatham =

Neighbourhood in Madurai district, Tamil Nadu, India

Samanatham (Meenakshi nagar)
- village
- Location in Tamil Nadu, India Samanatham (Meenakshi nagar) (India)
- Coordinates: 9.866674°N 78.14719°E
- Country: India
- State: Tamil Nadu
- District: Madurai
- Block: Thiruparankundram

Population (2001)
  - Total: 2,218

Languages
  - Official: Tamil
- Time zone: UTC+5:30 (IST)

Samanatham is the name of a panchayat village in the Madurai district of Tamil Nadu, India. It comes under the Thiruparankundram block. The word Samanatham means "the system or the practice of the Shamanas (Jains)".

== See also ==
- Impalement of the Jains in Madurai, a Shaivite legend about the killing of around 8000 Jains by the Pandyan king Koon Pandiyan at Samanatham
