= Vilwanatheswarar temple =

Vilwanatheswarar Temple
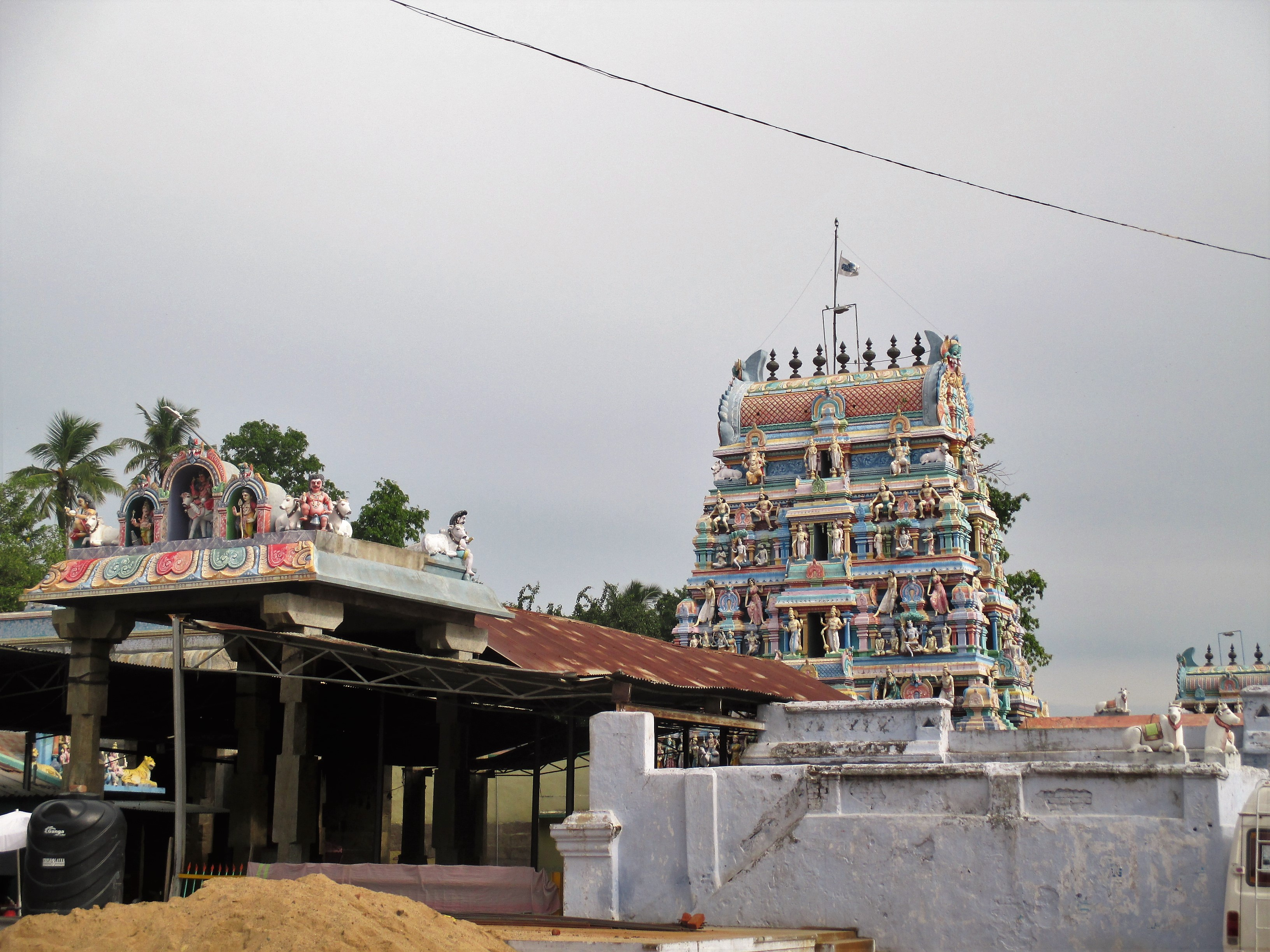

- Location in Tamil Nadu

Religion
- Affiliation: Hinduism
- District: Vellore
- Deity: Vilwanatheswarar(Shiva)

Location
- State: Tamil Nadu
- Country: India
- Coordinates: 12°59′02″N 79°16′0″E

Architecture
- Type: Dravidian architecture

Vilwanatheswarar Temple (also spelled Bilvanathesvara) is a Hindu temple dedicated to the deity Shiva, located in Thiruvalam, a village in Vellore district in the South Indian state of Tamil Nadu. Shiva is worshipped as Vilwanatheswarar, and is represented by the lingam. His consort Parvati is depicted as Vallambigai. The presiding deity is revered in the 7th century Tamil Saiva canonical work, the Tevaram, written by Tamil saint poets known as the Nayanars and classified as Paadal Petra Sthalam.

The temple complex covers around one acre and is entered through a five-tiered gopuram, the main gateway. The temple has a number of shrines, with those of Vilwanatheswarar and his consorts Vallambigai being the most prominent. All the shrines of the temple are enclosed in large concentric rectangular granite walls. The temple has many historic inscriptions from the 8th-century Nandivarman II era and later. The north wall of the temple is notable for one of the earliest inscriptions that mention Tevaram singers.

Many parts of the temple complex is attributed to the Cholas, while the present masonry structure was built during the Nayak during the 16th century. In modern times, the temple is maintained and administered by the Hindu Religious and Charitable Endowments Department of the Government of Tamil Nadu. The temple has four daily rituals at various times from 6:00 a.m. to 8:30 p.m., and four yearly festivals on its calendar. The Brahmotsavam festival is celebrated during the month of the Magam (February - March) is the most prominent festival.

== Legend ==
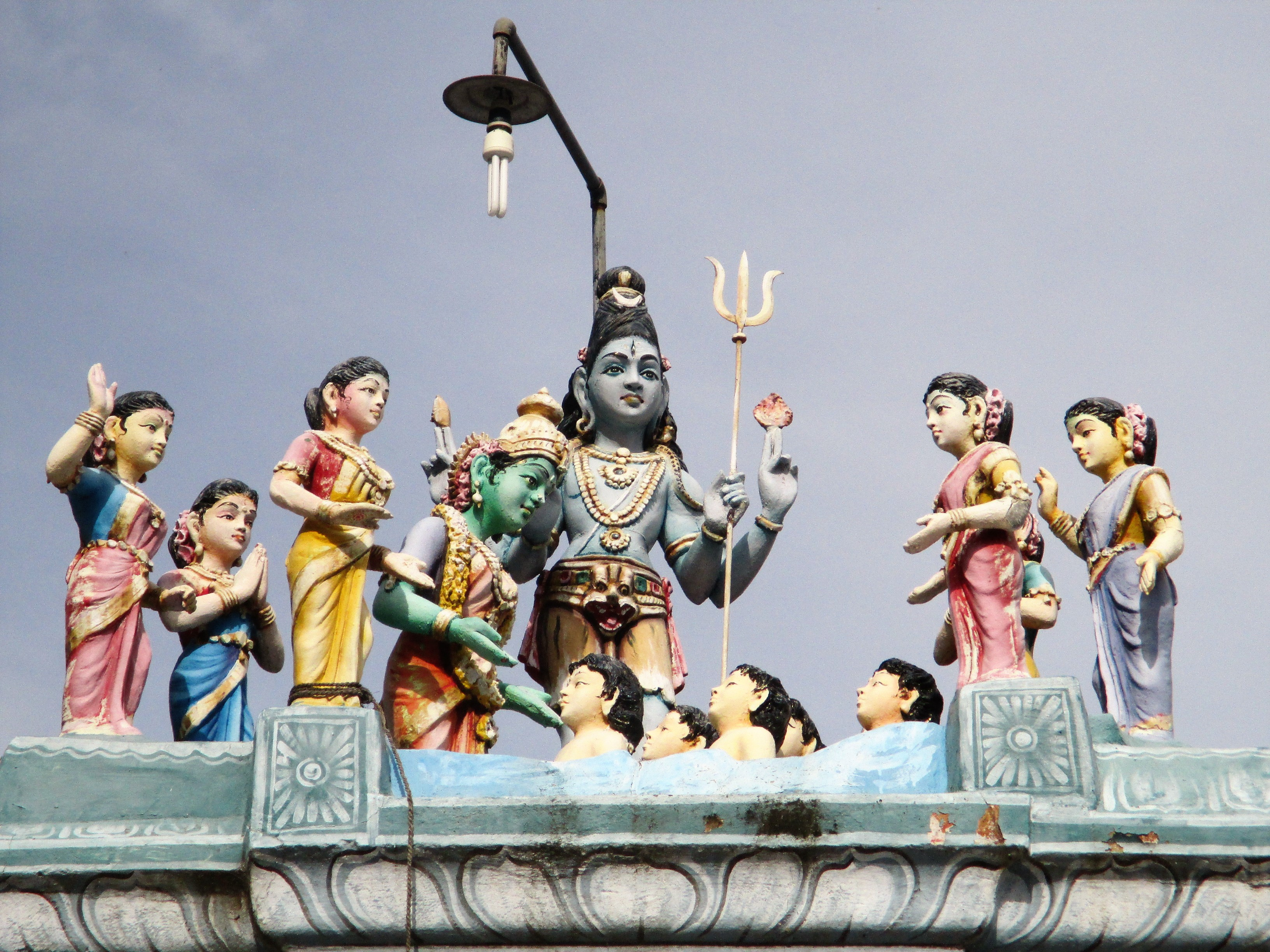
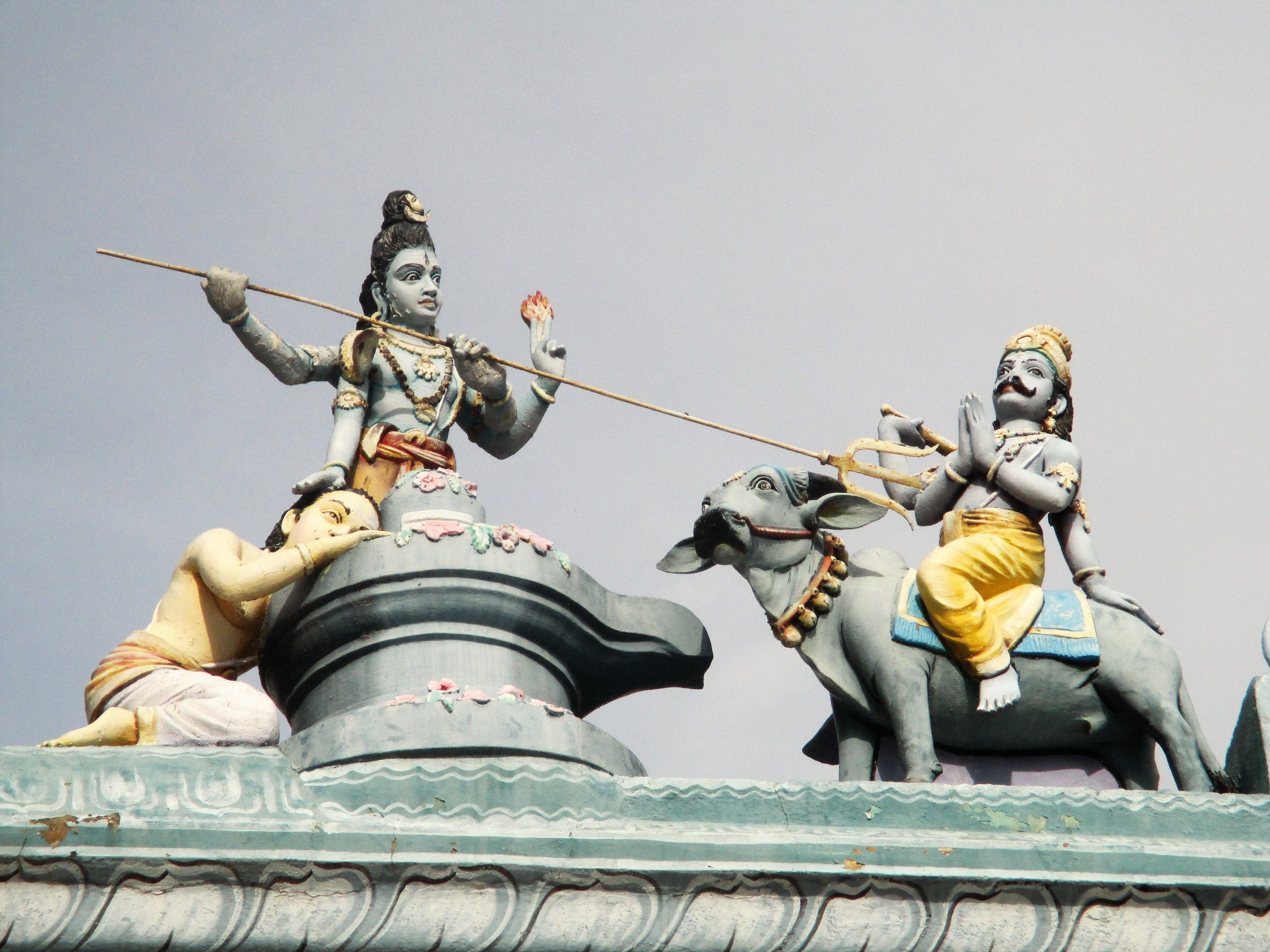
Stucco images of the temple legend

According to Hindu legend, Narada handed over a sacred mango to Shiva and wanted him to hand it over to a single person without cutting the fruit. Vinayaga and Muruga, the sons of Shiva, were fighting for the fruit. Shiva held a competition, stating that whoever circled the world three times would receive the fruit. Muruga immediately started on his peacock mount around the world. Vinayaga, who had a smaller rat mount, circled his parents Shiva and Parvathi three times and sought the fruit. He convinced his parents that for him, his parents were his world and he attained the experience of coming around the world by circumambulating them. Since he is believed to have come around (called valam in Tamil) his parents at this place, it came to be known as Thiruvalam, which with time became Thiruvallam. According to another legend, a priest in the temple was troubled by a giant named Kanja as he brought water from the nearby Kanjan mountain every day. He prayed for help, and Shiva sent the bull Nandi to guard the priest. As per another legend, Shiva is believed to called nee vaa meaning come here, on account of which the river came to be known as Neva river. It is also called Ponnai river.

This place is believed to have been a Vilva forest (Vilavanam). There seemed to be a termite hill where a cow used to milk water. The termite hill drained and eventually became a Lingam, around which the current temple is built. As per the inscriptions in the temple, the temple is referred to as Theekali Vallam. In the verses of Sambandar, the place is referred as Thiruvallam, while in the 15th century Arunagirinathar refers the temple as Thiruvalam and the presiding deity as Thiruvallam Udaiyar.

== Architecture ==
The temple has many inscriptions from the Chola period. The temple has a five-tiered gateway tower facing south and all the shrines of the temple are enclosed in concentric rectangular granite walls. The temple occupies an area of around 4 acres (1.6 ha). The central shrine houses the image of Vilwanatheswarar in the form of Lingam facing east. Unlike other temples, where the Nandi is located axial to and facing the sanctum, in this temple the Nandi faces the opposite direction. The sanctum is structured in the form of a moat. The central shrine is approached through the flagstaff and Mahamandapam, both which are located axial to the gateway. The shrine of Valambigai, the consort of Shiva facing West is located in the Mahamandapam leading to the sanctum. As in other Shiva temples in Tamil Nadu, the shrines of Vinayaka, Murugan, Navagraha, Chandikesa and Durga are located around the precinct of the main shrine. There is a hall of Nataraja near the sanctum. The image of Vinayagar is sculpted on a square base and a Padma peeta and sported holding a mango in his trunk. The Dvarapalas on both sides on the entrance of the sanctum are of architectural importance. One of them is unique and is sported in dance posture with a raised hand. There is a shrine of Pathaleswarar in the first precinct where the shrine of Lingam is located underground. In modern times, the temple is maintained and administered by the Hindu Religious and Charitable Endowments Department of the Government of Tamil Nadu.

== Religious importance and festivals ==
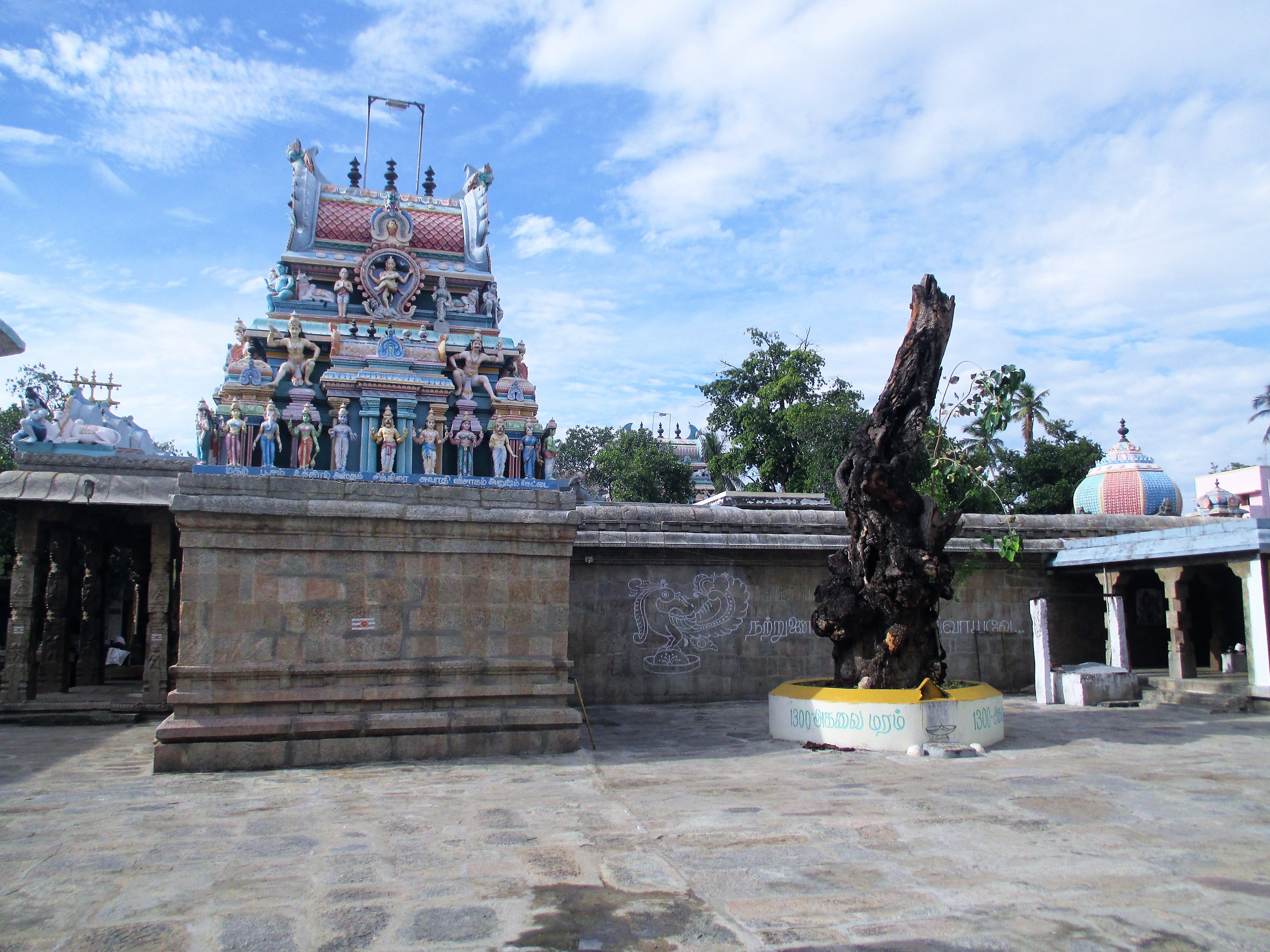
Image of shrine of the temple

It is one of the shrines of the 275 Paadal Petra Sthalams - Shiva Sthalams glorified in the early medieval Tevaram poems by Tamil Saivite Nayanars Sundarar. The temple houses the samadhi of Sanakar, the disciple of Dakshinamoorthy in front of the image of Shiva. The temple is also the place where Sivananda Mouna Guru Swamigal was doing penance. As the temple is revered in Tevaram, it is classified as Paadal Petra Sthalam, one of the 275 temples that find mention in the Saiva canon. The temple is counted as the 242nd in the list of 276 temples.
