= Tirunavalur =

Tirunavalur may refer to:

- Tirunavalur block, a revenue block in Kallakurichi district, Tamil Nadu, India
- Tirunavalur Assembly constituency, in Kallakurichi district, Tamil Nadu, India
