= Koon Pandiyan =

Ancient Tamil monarch

- Nindra Seer Nedumaran, Ninraseernedumaran, Kun Pandya
- Reign: 7th century CE
- Spouse: Mangayarkkarasiyar
- Dynasty: Pandya
- Religion: originally Jainism(later converted to Shaivism)

Koon Pandiyan ("The hunch-backed Pandyan") (Tamil: கூன் பாண்டியன்) was the nickname of a king who ruled Madurai around 7th century. Some historians identify him with the Pandyan king Arikesari Parankusa Maravarman.

He converted from Jainism to Shaivism, converted under the influence of Sambandar. According to a Shaivite legend, after his conversion, he ordered a impalement of 8000 Jains in Samanatham. However, according to the early version of the legend, the Jains voluntarily impaled themselves in order to fulfill their vow after losing the debate. This event is covered in Impalement of the Jains in Madurai. Sambandar is said to have cured his hunched back, after which he was known as Sundara Pandya ("Beautiful Pandyan").

== Quotes ==
"When he ruled thus, his enemies came from the north Waging a war; with his sea-like army, his flood Of swift steeds, and his rows and rows of wrathful And destructive elephants, he gave them battle At Tirunelveli and victoriously forged ahead.

In the field where the fierce battle was fought, The armies of the pre-eminent northern kings routed By the Paandya’s army endowed with musty elephants

Whose long tusks were tall like The palmyra trees, scattered away; the king Thereupon wore the victorious garland of fragrant Vaakai along with the Paandya’s own, of neem."

== Conversion to Shaivism ==
In the 7th century, Jainism was one of the major religions in South India. Koon Pandian had embraced Jainism from Shaivism, but his wife, Mangayarkkarasiyar, and his minister, Kulachirai Nayanar, were both Shaivites. When the king suffered from boils and incurable fever, the two invited the Shaivite saint, Sambandar, to Madurai. Sambandar is said to have cured his fever and his hunched back. After this, the king became a Shaivite, and several of his subjects converted to Shaivism during his rule. The Tamil poet Sekkizhar honoured Koon Pandiyan, Kulachirai and Mangaiarkkarasi by naming them among the 63 Nayanars in Periya Puranam.

According to a Shaivite legend, when the Jains in Samanatham refused to convert to Shaivism, the king ordered their killings with the consent of Sambandar. Around 8,000 Jains were said to have been killed by impalement in which the victims were forcefully put over sharp, tall, conical structures in sitting posture. However, this legend is not found in any Jain text and is believed to be a fabrication made up by the Shaivites to prove their dominance.

== Legacy ==
Koon Pandiyan is said to have died without a legitimate heir, and after his death, a number of claimants fought with each other to control the kingdom.
