= Sadaiya Nayanar =

Hindu Nayanar saint, father of the saint Sundarar

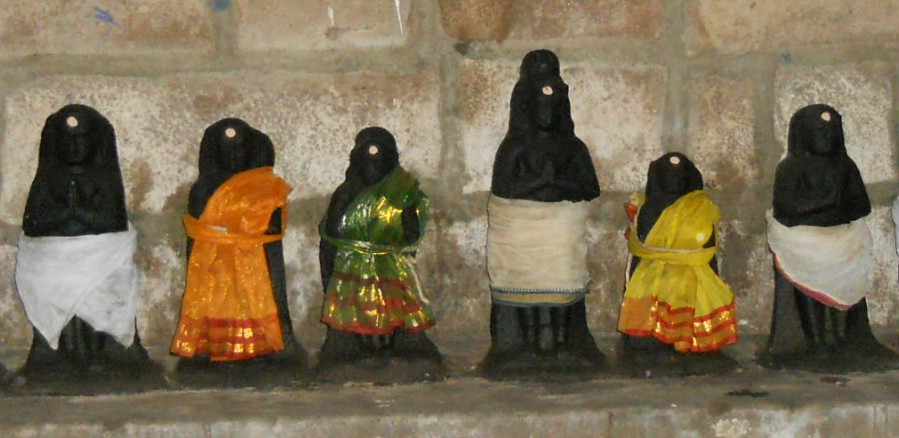
Family of Sundarar (from left): Sadaiya Nayanar (father), Isaignaniyar (mother), Paravai Nachiyar (wife), Sundarar, Sangili Nachiyar (wife), and Narasinga Muniyaraiyar (foster-father).

Sadaiya Nayanar or Sadaiyar (Note: Other names and spellings include: Sadaya Nayanar, Chadaiya Nayanar, Sataiya Nayanar, Sadaiyan, Cataiyan, Sadaiyanar, Cataiyanar) is a 7th century Nayanar saint in the Hindu sect of Shaivism, venerated for being father of the prominent saint Sundarar rather than for individual merit. He and his wife Isaignaniyar are generally counted as sixty-second and sixty-third on the list of the sixty-three Nayanar saints. Sundarar is the only Nayanar with both parents venerated.

== Life ==
Little is known about Sadaiya Nayanar. The Tamil Periya Puranam, a twelfth-century hagiography by Sekkizhar and the main source about the sixty-three Nayanars, only dedicates one hymn to him, naming his son Sundarar and wife Isaignaniyar. Besides being mentioned in his own one-verse chapter in Sekkizhar's hagiography, Sadaiya Nayanar also appears in the main chapter of the text, which narrates the legend of his son Sundarar, who is regarded as the hero of the Periya Puranam. Sadaiya Nayanar, his wife as well as his ancestors are described as devout devotees of the god Shiva, the patron god of Shaivism. Sadaiya Nayanar and his wife lived in Tirunavalur, in the kingdom of Thirumunaipadi, in the present-day Indian state of Tamil Nadu. They belonged to Adi Shaiva sub-sect of Shaivism and belonged to the Brahmin (priest) caste. The father of Sadaiya Nayanar is named as Arurar in the text. It is said that Sadaiya Nayanar had brought many virtues in his previous birth and was thus blessed by Shiva to have an illustrious son Sundarar. Sadaiya Nayanar names his son - who would be later known as Sundarar - Nambi Arurar (a name found in many of Sundarar's verses), after his own father. He and his wife are said to have lived an ideal Grihastha (householder's) life. Narasinga Muniyaraiyar, the chieftain of Thirumunaipadi and a Nayanar saint, once met the child Nambi Arurar and was impressed by him. The chieftain asked Sadaiya Nayanar for consent for the adoption of his son, which he readily gave. Sundarar grew up in luxury in the home of his foster-father. The Hindu spiritual guru Sivananda Saraswati (1887–1963) praises the non-attachment to samsara and the worldly things, which he demonstrates by giving away his child without hesitation.

As Nambi Arurar grew up and attained a marriageable age, Sadaiya Nayanar started searching for a suitable wife for his son. Sadaiya Nayanar sent a delegation of elders to Sadangkavi of Putthoor - a Shaiva Brahmin like Sadaiya Nayanar - to ask for his daughter's hand for Nambi Arurar. After deliberations with the elders, Sadangkavi agreed to the match and conveyed his acceptance of the marriage proposal via the elders to Sadaiya Nayanar. On the anointed way, the bridegroom and his wedding party reached Putthoor, however, Shiva appears as an aged Brahmin and breaks the wedding and takes Nambi Arurar to Thiruvennainallur, arguing Nambi Arurar is his bonded labour as per a contract signed by his grandfather Arurar.

== Remembrance ==
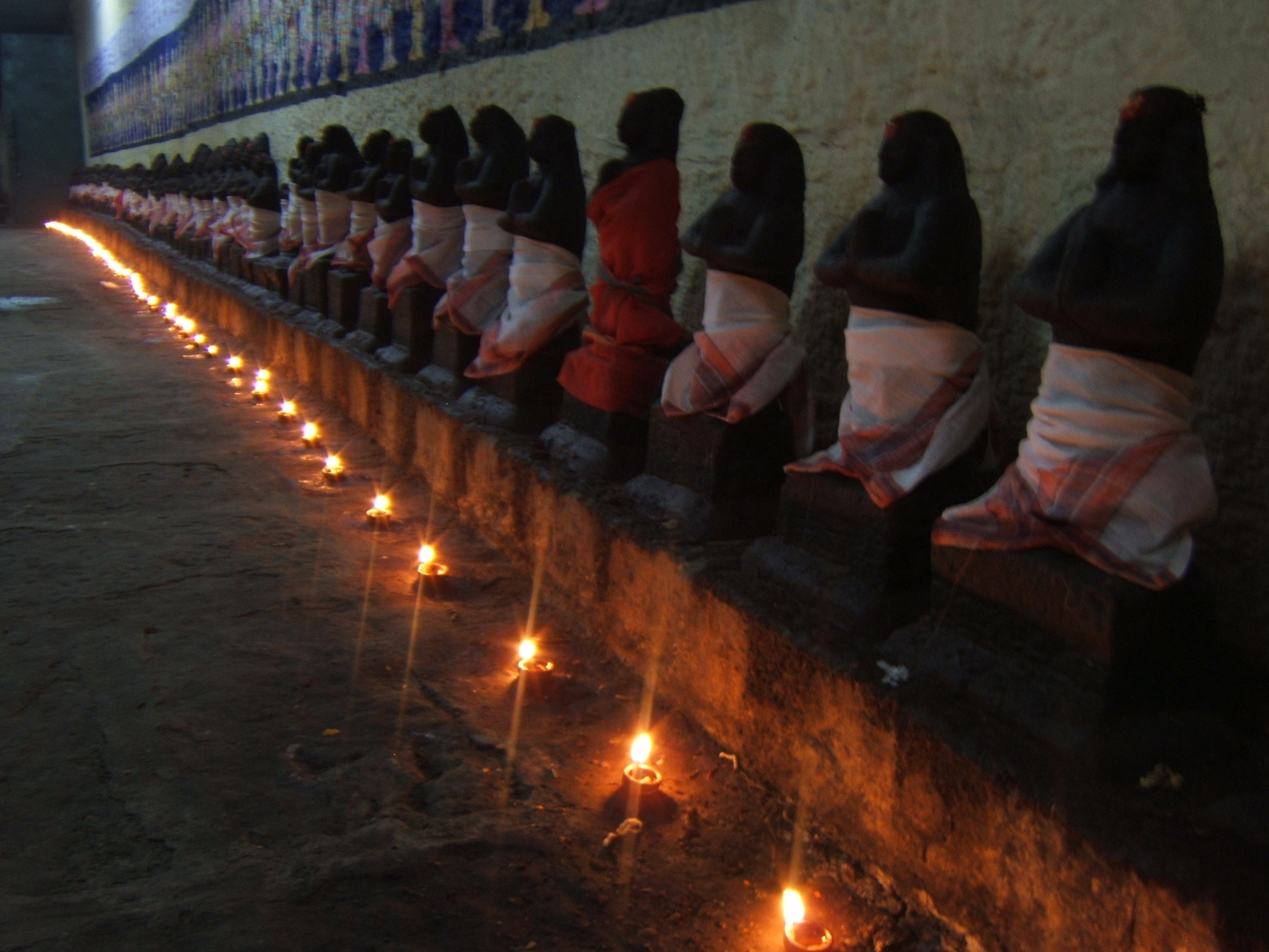
The images of the Nayanars are found in many Shiva temples in Tamil Nadu.

Sundarar refers to his father Sadaiyan in the Tiruthonda Thogai, a hymn to Nayanar saints, which is the first compilation of the list. In many of his verses, he introduces himself the son of Sadaiyan.

Sadaiya Nayanar is worshipped on Thiruvathira, the Purnima (full moon day) of the Tamil month of Margazhi. He is depicted standing with folded hands (see Anjali mudra) and a shaved head. He receives collective worship as part of the 63 Nayanars. Their icons and brief accounts of his deeds are found in many Shiva temples in Tamil Nadu. Their images are taken out in procession in festivals.
