= Kulachirai Nayanar =

Nayanar saint

Kulachirai Nayanar was a minister of the Pandyan king, Koon Pandyan, and one of the 63 Nayanars mentioned in the Periya Puranam.

== Birth and life ==
Kulachirai Nayanar was born into a noble family in Manamelkudi in the Pandyan Kingdom. He became the Prime Minister of the Pandyan King Koon Pandiyan. He was well known for being hospitable to Shaivite saints and poets.

== Devotion to Lord Shiva ==
He was an ardent devotee of Lord Shiva and remained a staunch Shaivite in his country which was becoming increasingly influenced by Jainism. The Pandyan King converted to Jainism and became a Jain fanatic, forbidding his Queen Mangayarkkarasiyar to even wear Thiruneeru on her forehead. Having converted the king, the Jain monks started to wield greater power in the kingdom. Hindus in the kingdom suffered persecution and indignation. The Queen feared that if left unchecked, the spread of Jainism would wipe out Shaivism entirely from Madurai. He was the only solace of Mangayarkkarasiyar who still remained a staunch Shaivite. The Prime Minister sympathized with the Queen and they were both deeply concerned about the spread of Jainism and the atrocities committed by the Jain monks in Madurai.

The Queen and the Prime Minister were struggling to find a way to get rid of Jainism and bring Shaivism to its prior prominence in the kingdom. But their efforts were in vain because of the King's fanaticism. During this time, the queen heard news that Appar and Sambandar had committed a miracle in the Vedaranyeswarar Temple by opening and closing the temple doors with their devotional verses. Having failed in all her attempts, the Queen made up her mind to seek the help of Appar and Sambandar. She dispatched the Prime Minister to invite Appar and Sambandar to Madurai.

Appar and Sambandar accepted the Queen's request and came to Madurai. They faced a lot of obstacles from the Jain monks on their way but successfully overcame them. King Koon Pandiyan had been ailing from incurable boils for a long time and also had a hunchback. He got the name Koon Pandiyan because of his hunchback. The Jain monks tried their best to cure the King with their medicines but to little avail. Sambandar cured the king of his boils by singing hymns and applying Thiruneeru on the king's body. The king was also cured of his hunchback and came to be known as Ninra Seer Nedumaara Nayanar (meaning 'one who stands tall and erect' in Tamil).

Sambandar had earned the King's devotion and the King immediately reconverted to Shaivism. With the King's reconversion, Jainism's influence diminished considerably and Shaivism regained its prior prominence in the kingdom. For their role in the spread of Shaivism, the Queen, the Prime Minister and the King were each individually included in the list of Nayanmars and their tales were rendered in the hagiographic poem Periyapuranam compiled by Sekkizhar as well as in the Tiruthondar Thogai written by the poet-saint Sundarar.

== See also ==
- Nayanmars
- Shivism
