= Tirunavalur block =

The Thirunavalur block is a revenue block in the Kallakurichi district of Tamil Nadu, India. It has a total of 44 panchayat villages.
