= Sambandar =

Shaiva poet-saint of Tamil Nadu

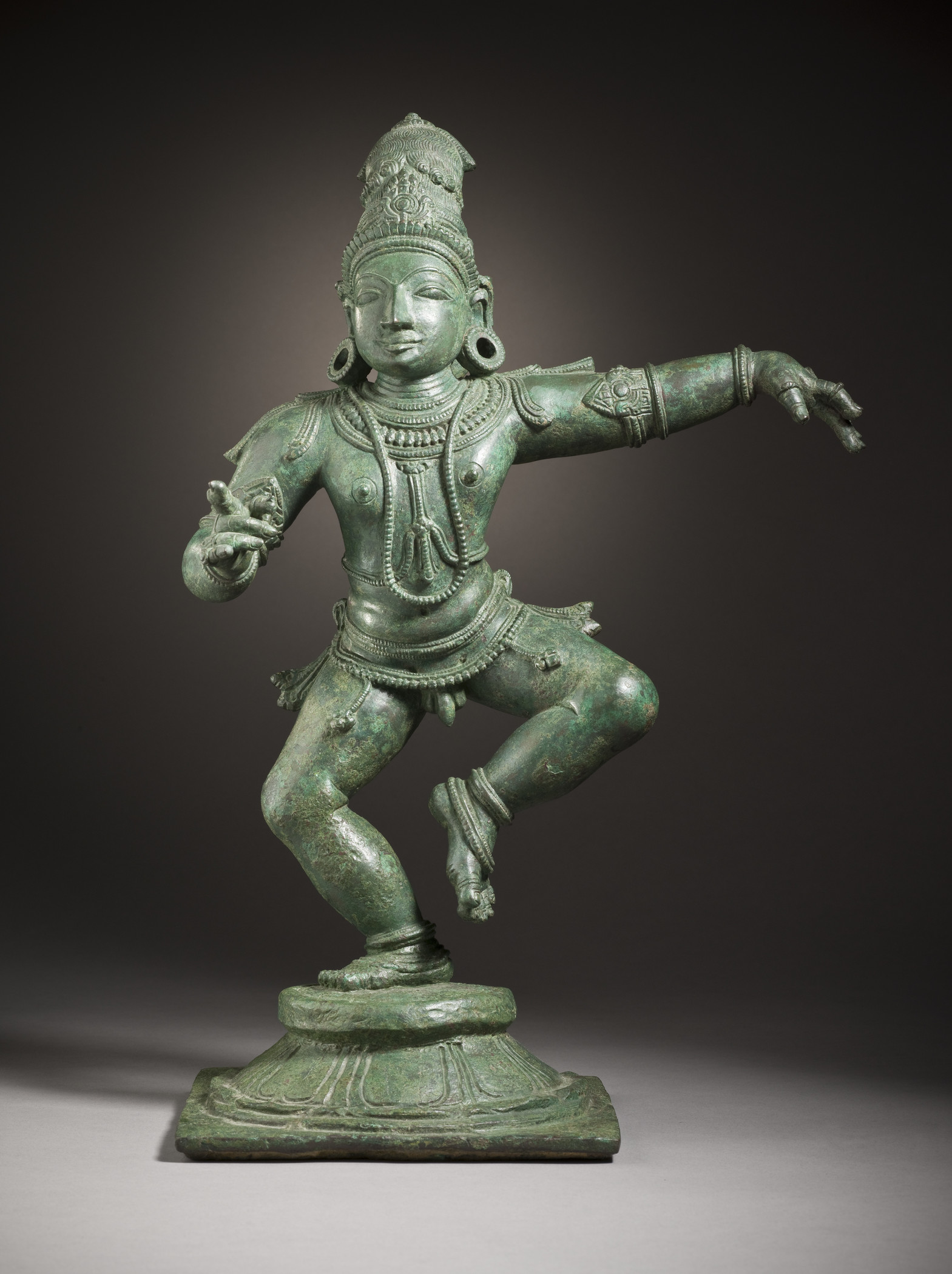
- A copper alloy sculpture of Sambandar with forefinger pointing slightly up (symbolically towards Parvati and Shiva)

Personal life
- Born: 6th–7th century Sirkazhiswaram, Chola Empire (present Sirkazhi, Mayiladuthurai district, Tamil Nadu, India)
- Notable work: Tevaram
- Honors: Nayanar saint, Muvar

Religious life
- Religion: Hinduism
- Philosophy: Shaivism, Bhakti

Sambandar (Tamil: சம்பந்தர், romanized: Campantar), also referred to as Tirujnana Sambandar (திருஞானசம்பந்தர், Tiruñāṉacampantar), was a Shaiva poet-saint of Tamil Nadu who lived sometime in the 7th century CE. According to the Tamil Shaiva tradition, he composed an oeuvre of 16,000 hymns in complex meters, of which 383 (384) hymns with 4,181 stanzas have survived. These narrate an intense loving devotion (bhakti) to the Hindu god Shiva. Sambandar died when he was sixteen years of age. The surviving compositions of the poet-saint are preserved in the first three volumes of the Tirumurai and provide a part of the philosophical foundation of Shaiva Siddhanta.

He is one of the most prominent of the sixty-three Nayanars, Tamil Shaiva bhakti saints who lived between the sixth and the tenth centuries CE. He was a contemporary of Appar, another Shaiva poet-saint.

== Life ==
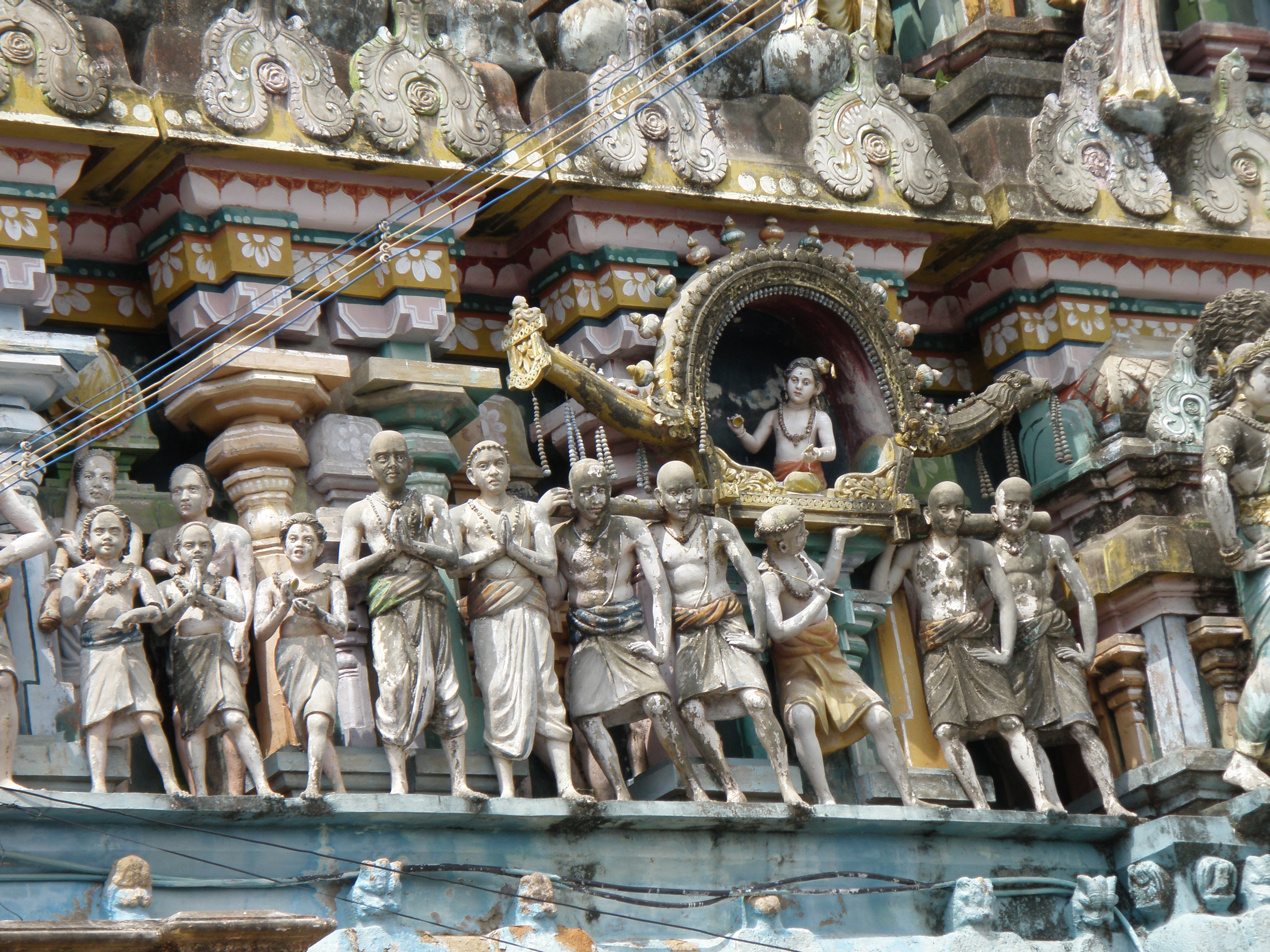
Amirthakadaieeshwarar temple relief depicting Appar bearing Sambandar's palanquin

Information about Sambandar comes mainly from the Periya Puranam, the eleventh-century Tamil book on the Nayanars that forms the last volume of the Tirumurai, along with the earlier Tiruttondartokai, poetry by Sundarar and Nambiyandar Nambi's Tiru Tondar Tiruvandadi. A Sanskrit hagiography called Brahmapureesa Charitam is now lost. The first three volumes of the Tirumurai contain three hundred and eighty-four poems of Sambandar, all that survive out of a reputed more than 10,000 hymns.

According to the Tamil texts, Sambandar was born to Sivapada Hrudiyar and his wife Bhagavathiar who lived in Sirkazhi, Tamil Nadu. They were Shaivite Brahmins. When Sambandar was three years old, his parents took him to the Shiva temple, where Shiva and his consort Parvati appeared before the child. His father saw drops of milk on the child's mouth and asked who had fed him, whereupon the boy pointed to the sky and responded with the song Todudaya Seviyan, the first verse of the Tevaram. At the age of three, he is said to have mastered the Vedas. Sambandar merged with the divine effulgence in the Tamil month of Vaikasi at the age of sixteen at his wedding along with all the attendees.

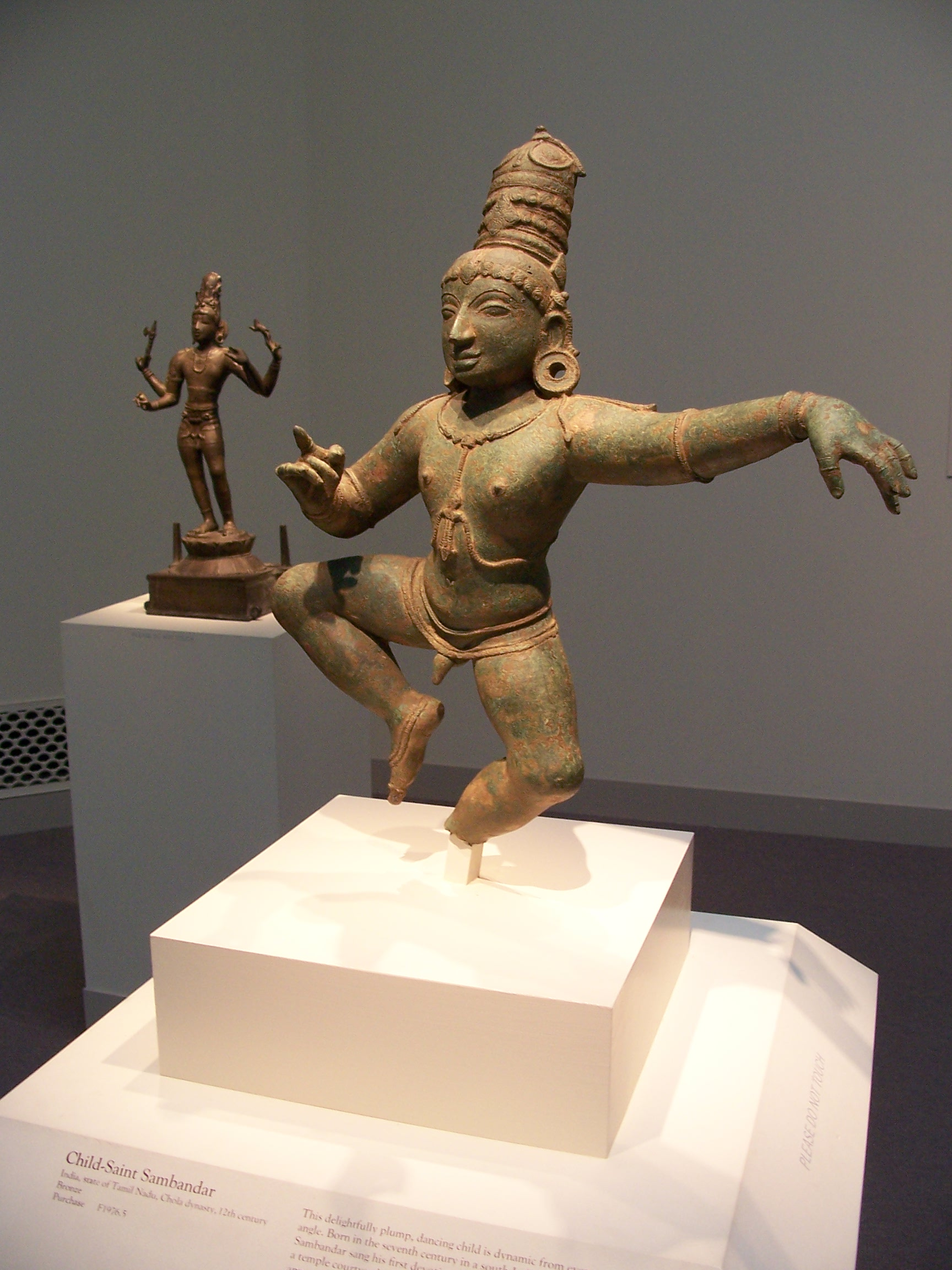
The Child Saint Sambandar, chola bronze, 12th century India, Freer Gallery of Art, Washington DC

=== Inscriptions ===
An inscription of Rajaraja Chola I at Tiruvarur mentions Sambandar along with Appar, Sundarar and the latter's wife Nangai Paravaiyar.

Many other inscriptions likely are related to the musical bhakti singing tradition founded by Sambandar and other Nayanars. The singers of these hymns were referred to as Tirupadiyam Vinnapam seyvar or Pidarar in Tamil inscriptions from about the 8th to 16th centuries, such as the inscriptions of Nandivarman III in the Tiruvallam Bilavaneswara temple records. Rajaraja deputed 48 pidarars and made liberal provisions for their maintenance and successors. A few earlier records give details about the gifts rendered to the singers of Tevaram from Parantaka I of the 8th century. A record belonging to Rajendra I mentions Tevaranayakan, the supervisor of Tevaram and shows the institutionalisation of Tevaram with the establishment of a department. There are records from Kulothunga Chola III from Nallanyanar temple in South Arcot indicating singing of Tiruvempavai and Tiruvalam of Manickavasagar during special occasion in the temple.

=== Iconography ===
Sambandar's image is found in almost all Shiva temples of Tamil Nadu. He is depicted as a dancing child or a young teen with his right forefinger pointing upwards, reflecting the legend where he credits Parvati-Shiva for what he has. A Chola bronze of Sambandar with a height of 52 cm (20 in) in standing posture dated to about the 12th century was found in Velankanni in Nagapattinam district. He is sported with catura posture with his feat on Padmasana and he is sported with jewels around his neck. Another image found in Tiruindalur in dancing posture with a height of 52 cm (20 in) dated 1150 has Sambandar sported with his right feet over a pedestal. Both the bronze images are stored in the Bronze gallery in Government Museum, Chennai.

== Compositions and legacy ==
Sambandar is the first poet-saint featured in the Tirumurai, the canonical works of Tamil Shaiva Siddhanta. His compositions grace Volume I, II and III of the twelve-volume compilation. He has been highly influential on Tamil Shaivism. His ideas and emotional devotion to Shiva are shared by other Nayanars and the Shaiva community they help organize. He is lucid in explaining the link between the Vedic tradition and the temple tradition. According to Cort, Sambandar clearly explains this through his hymn praising the power of the namah sivaya mantra:

It guides to the good path,
all those who melt with love,
and flow with tears as they chant it.
It is the essence of the four Vedas,
Chant our Lord's name,
say, 'Hail Siva!"
– Translated by John Cort

This is part of the refrain found in the Vedic teaching called the Śatarudrīya saṁhita, states Cort, the foundation that transmutes that Vedic tradition into the Agamic ritual tradition of Shaiva Siddhanta. Sambandar and other Nayanars help shift the focus from celebrating the Vedic canonical text into a "magical connection with Siva" whereby every devotee can have a personal, direct connection to Shiva and the essence of Shiva within him or her. It helps shift the spiritual experience from being channeled through Brahmin priests to being channeled through a direct loving connection with one's own Shiva. In effect, states Cort, "the essence of the Veda" displaces the Vedic text itself through the tradition pioneered by Sambandar, Appar and Sundarar.

=== Temple services ===
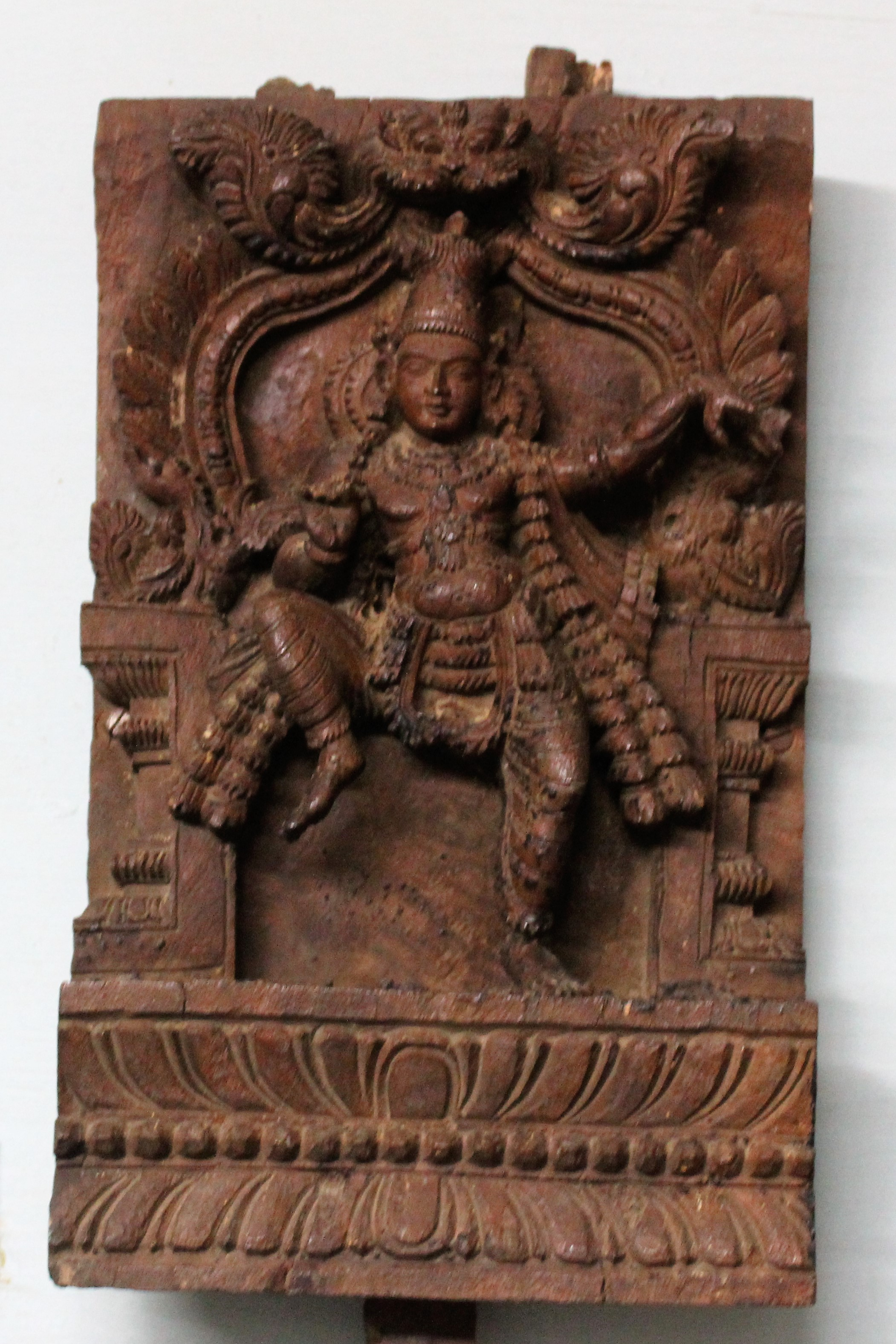
Sambandar (Wooden Image), ASI Museum, Vellore

The pilgrimage to temples, associated devotional singing with music, and other rituals started by Sambandar have thrived over the centuries. In contemporary Tamil Shiva temples, Odhuvars, Sthanikars, or Kattalaiyars offer musical programmes in Shiva temples of Tamil Nadu by singing Tevaram after the daily rituals. These are usually carried out as chorus programmes soon after the divine offering. The singing of Tevaram was followed by musicals from the music pillars in such temples like Madurai Meenakshi Amman Temple, Nellaiappar Temple and Suchindram.

Periya Puranam, the eleventh-century Tamil book on the Nayanars that forms the last volume of the Tirumurai primarily had references only to Tevaram and subsequently expanded to 12 parts and is one of the first anthologies of Tirumurai. One of the first anthologies of moovars hymns called the Tevara Arulmuraitirattu is linked to Tamil Shaiva Siddhanta philosophy by grouping ninety-nine verses into 10 categories. The category headings are God, soul, bond, grace, divine initiation, methodology, enlightenment, bliss, mantra and liberation - correspond to Umapthi's work, Tiruvarutpayan. Tirumurai kanda puranam is another anthology for Tirumurai as a whole, but primarily focuses on Tevaram. It is the first of the works to refer to the collection of volumes as Tirumurai.

=== Tamil Shaiva ethos ===
The hymns of Sambandar include criticism and allegations of persecution of the Shaiva community by Jain monks, along with a "bitter anti-Jain polemic". Sambandar critiques the duplicity he sees. The early studies of this Jain-Hindu interaction, as seen in Sambandar hymns and other early Shaiva literature, is one where Jainism is inferred as the heterodox popular religion followed by a revival and triumph of Shaiva Hinduism. The situation was likely more complicated and driven by historical developments and context. The Buddhists denied the "existence of soul", states Nilakanta Sastri, while the Jains recommended "asceticism and suffering" – a period in Tamil culture where such "pessimism" must have been the ethos.

Shaivism retooled its Vedic roots and transmuted the Vedic ritual into a personalized temple bhakti ritual. Thus, the Shaiva poet-saints such as Sambandar and Appar emerged with an optimistic, cheerful celebration of Shiva, soul and life with music and songs. This may have represented a change to the earlier ethos of Tamil society. This evolution is embedded in the mythohistory of Shaiva legends, which accuse Jain monks of scheming and torturing Sambandar, Appar and others, followed by a reversal. These legends, states Richard Davis, are better studied as symbolic conflict of ideas, a competition for patronage and transformation of Tamil social ethos through a Brahmin-peasant alliance. The Shaiva literature and songs characterize Jain monks and their ascetic lifestyle as false doctrines with no emotional or spiritual value in this or the next life. They offer a new vision to the Tamil society and culture where devotion to Shiva temple, community and loving engagement to life is the path to liberation.

== Translation of Sambandar hymns ==
Francis Kingsbury and Godfrey Phillips selected and translated 24 out of 383 of Sambandar's hymns into English in 1921. These were published with a small collection of Appar and Sundarar hymns in a book titled Hymns of the Tamil Śaivite Saints, released by the Oxford University Press. They stated that these were some of the hymns from Devaram (Tevaram) that they could hear being chanted in South Indian Shiva temples of their times.

Indira Peterson has published a more recent translation of many of Sambandar's hymns.

As an example of this devotional ethos, the first recorded verse by Tiruñāṉacampantar — traditionally believed to have been sung at age three after receiving divine milk from the goddess Parvati — describes Lord Shiva's awe-inspiring attributes and his dwelling at Piramapuram:

தோடுடைய செவியன் விடையேறியோர் தூவெண்
மதிசூடிக்
காடுடைய சுடலைப் பொடிபூசி யென்னுள்ளங்கவர்
கள்வ
னேடுடைய மலரான் முனநாள் பணிந்தேந்த்தவருள்
செய்த
பீடுடைய பிரமா புரமேவிய பெம்மானிவனன்றே.

Tōṭuṭaiya ceviyaṉ viṭaiyēṟiyōr tūveṇ
maticūṭik
kāṭuṭaiya cuṭalaip poṭipūci yeṉṉuḷḷaṅkavar
kaḷva
ṉēṭuṭaiya malarāṉ muṉanāḷ paṇintēnttavaruḷ
ceyta
pīṭuṭaiya piramā puramēviya pem'māṉivaṉaṉṟē.

He wore an earring in his ear, and rode a bull, adorning a white crescent moon;
Smeared with ash from the cremation ground, he is the thief who stole my heart.
He is the one worshipped in ancient times by the lotus-seated Brahma, who received his grace;

He is the exalted Lord who dwells in the glorious Piramapuram.

— Thirugnanasambandar, Tevāram I.1.1,
Translated by Francis Kingsbury and Godfrey Phillips
