= Paadal Petra Sthalam =

Group of Shaivite temples in India

Om symbol Tirumurai Om symbol in Tamil
The twelve volumes of Tamil Śaiva hymns of the sixty-three Nayanars
Parts	Name	Author
1,2,3	(Tevaram) Thirukkadaik Kaappu	Sambandar
4,5,6	Tevaram	Thirunavukkarasar
7	(Tevaram) Thiruppattu	Sundarar
8	Thiruvasakam & Thirukkovaiyar	Manickavasagar
9	Thiruvisaippa & Thirupallandu	Various
10	Thirumandhiram	Thirumular
11	Saiva Prabandham	Various
12	Periya Puranam	Sekkizhar
Paadal Petra Sthalam
Paadal Petra Sthalam
Rajaraja I
Nambiyandar Nambi

The Paadal Petra Sthalams (Tamil: பாடல் பெற்ற தலங்கள்), also known as Devara Sthalams, are 276 temples that are revered in the verses of Shaiva Nayanars in the 6th-9th century CE. The Divya Desams by comparison are the 108 Vishnu temples glorified in the poems of the contemporary Sri Vaishnava Alvars of Tamil Nadu, India.

== Tevaram ==
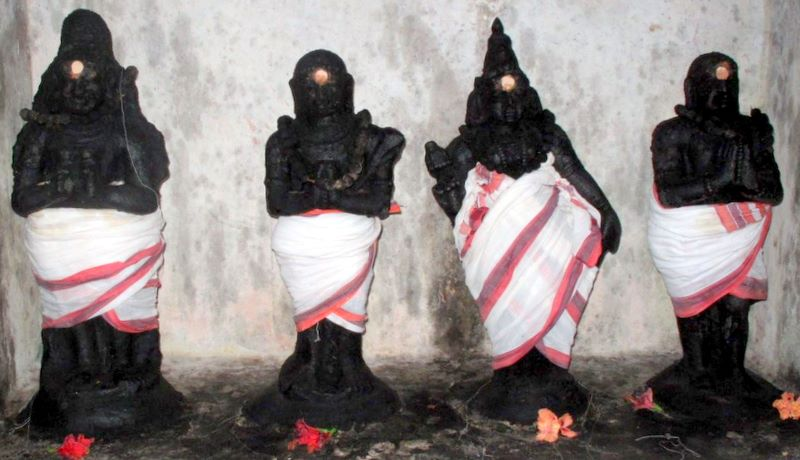
The three foremost Nayanars with Manikkavacakar - collectively called the Nalvar: (from left) Sambandar, Appar, Sundarar, and Manikkavacakar.

Tevaram literally means, "garland of divine songs" and refers to the collection of verses sung in praise of Shiva, the supreme god of the Shaivite sect of Hinduism, by three Tamil poets known as Shaiva Kuruvars - Sambandar, Appar, and Sundarar. The three are considered the primary three among the sixty-three Nayanars. The former two lived during the 7th century CE while the latter around the 8th century CE. All songs in Tevaram are believed to be in sets of ten songs, called patikam in Tamil. Some musical experts consider Tevaram as a divine musical form. There is a common view that Sanskritisation of names of the temples are carried out in later period that superseded the names mentioned in Tevaram - some of the common examples are Chidambaram as against Tillai in Tevaram and Kumbakonam as against Kudanthai.

The 275 temples that are mentioned in Tevaram are referred as the Paadal Petra Sthalam, meaning the temples that were sung in the verses. On the contrary, Vaippu Sthalam are temples that were mentioned casually in the songs of the text. In modern times, the verses of the Tevaram are sung daily and during the festive occasions in most Shiva temples in Tamil Nadu by musicians called Odhuvars.

== Thiruvasagam ==
Manikkavacakar is considered the 4th in the line of Shaiva Kuravars, whose verses are classified as Thiruvasagam. There is a saying that "Thiruvasagathuku urugar, oru vasagathukum orugar" meaning the person who does not budge for thiruvasagam won't budge for anything else.

== Description ==
There are around 276 temples that are revered by the verses of Shaiva Nayanmars and are amongst the greatest Shiva Temples of Tamil Nadu. 267 temples in Tamil Nadu, 2 temples in Andhra pradesh, 1 temple in kerala, 1 temple in karnataka, 2 temples in Uttarakhand, 2 temples in Sri Lanka, 1 temple in Nepal, and Tirukailayam in Mount Kailash. The list is as shown below.

Chola Nadu - North of Kaveri	Chola Nadu - South of Kaveri	Tondai Nadu	Pandya Nadu	Nadu Nadu
1. Kovil (Chidambaram); 2. Tiruvetkalam; 3. Tirunelvayil; 4. Tirukkazhippalai; 5. Tirunallurpperumanam; 6. Mahendrapalli; 7. Ten Tirumullaivayil; 8. Kalikkaamoor; 9. Tiruchaaikaadu; 10. Pallavaneeswaram; 11. Thiruvenkadu; 12. Keezhai Tirukkattuppalli; 13. Thirukkurugavur; 14. Sirkazhi; 15. Tirukkolakka; 16. Pullirukkuvelur; (Vaideeswaran Koyil); 17. Kannaar Kovil; 18. Tirukkadaimudi; 19. Tiruninriyur; 20. Tiruppunkur; 21. Tiruneedur; 22. Anniyur; 23. Tiruvelvikudi; 24. Edirkolpaadi; 25. Tirumanancheri; 26. Tirukkurukkai; 27. Karuppariyalur; 28. Kurakkukka; 29. Tiruvaalkoliputrur; 30. Tirumannippadikkarai; 31. Omampuliyur; 32. Tirukkaanaattumulloor; 33. Tirunaarayur; 34. Kadambur; 35. Pandanallur; 36. Kanjanoor; 37. Tirukkodikka; 38. Tirumangalakkudi; 39. Tiruppanantaal; 40. Tiruvaappaadi; 41. Tirucheignalur; 42. Tirundudevankudi; 43. Tiruviyalur; 44. Kottaiyur; 45. Innambar; 46. Thirupirambiyam; 47. Vijayamangai; 48. Tiruvaikavur; 49. Vadakurangaaduturai; 50. Tiruppazhanam; 51. Thiruvaiyaru; 52. Tiruneittanam; 53. Tirupperumpuliyur; 54. Thirumazhapadi; 55. Tiruppazhuvur (Aalanturai); 56. Tirukkaanoor; 57. Anbilalanturai; 58. Tirumaanturai; 59. Tiruppaatrurai; 60. Tiru Aanaikkaa; 61. Tiruppainneeli; 62. Tiruppaachilasramam; 63. Tiruveengoimalai	1. Vaatpokki; 2. Kadambar Kovil; 3. Thirupparaithurai; 4. Tirukkarkudi; (Uyyakkondan Malai); 5. Thirumukeeswaram; 6. Tiruchirappalli; 7. Tiruverumbur; 8. Nedunkalam; 9. Melaittirukkattuppalli; 10. Tiruvalampozhil; 11. Tiruppoonturutti; 12. Thirukkandiyur; 13. Tiruchotrutturai; 14. Tiruvedikudi; 15. Tenkudittittai; 16. Tirupullamangai; 17. Tiruchakrapalli; 18. Thirukkarugavur; 19. Tiruppaalaitturai(Papanasam); 20. Tirunallur; 21. Aavoor Pasupateeswaram; 22. Satthi Mutram; 23. Patteswaram; 24. Pazhayarai; 25. Tiruvalanchuzhi; 26. Adi Kumbeswarar Temple; 27. Tirukkudandai Keezhkottam; 28. Kudandaikkaaronam; 29. Tirunageswaram; 30. Tiruvidaimarudur; 31. Ten Kurangaaduturai; 32. Tiruneelakkudi; 33. Tiruvaikalmaadakkovil; 34. Tirunallam; 35. Tirukkozhambam; 36. Tiruvavaduturai; 37. Tirutturutti; 38. Tiruvazhundur; 39. Mayiladuthurai; 40. Viilanagar; 41. Tiruppariyalur; 42. Tiruchemponpalli; 43. Tirunanipalli; 44. Tiruvalampuram; 45. Tiruttalaichankadu; 46. Aakkoor; 47. Tirukkadavur; 48. Tirukkadavur Mayaanam; 49. Tiruvettakkudi; 50. Tiruttelicheri; 51. Dharumapuram; 52. Thirunallar; 53. Tirukkottaru; 54. Ambar; 55. Ambar Maakaalam; 56. Tirumeeyachur; 57. Tirumeeyachur Ilamkovil; 58. Thilataipati; 59. Tiruppaampuram; 60. Sirukudi; 61. Tiruveezhimizhalai; 62. Tiruvanniyur; 63. Karuvili Kottittai; 64. Penu Perunturai; 65. Naraiyur; 66. Arisirkaraiputtur; 67. Sivapuram; 68. Kalayanallur; 69. Tirukkarukkudi; 70. Tiruvanchiyam; 71. Nannilam; 72. Tirukkondeeswaram; 73. Tiruppanaiyur; 74. Virkudi; 75. Tiruppugalur; 76. Tiruppugalur Vardhamaneswaram; 77. Ramanadeeswaram; 78. Tiruppayatrankudi; 79. Tiruchenkattankudi; 80. Thirumarugal; 81. Tiruchaattamangai; 82. Nagaikkaronam; 83. Sikkal; 84. Keevalur; 85. Tiruttevur; 86. Palliyin Mukkoodal; 87. Achaleswaram; 88. Tiruvarur; 89. Arurparavaiumandali; 90. Vilamar; 91. Karaveeram; 92. Peruvelur; 93. Talaiyalankadu; 94. Tirukkudavaayil; 95. Tirucherai; 96. Tirunalurmayaanam; 97. Kaduvaaikaaraiputhur; 98. Tiruvirumpoolai; 99. Aradaipperumpazhi; 100.Avalivanallur; 101.Paridiniyamam; 102. Tiruvenniyur (Koyil venni); 103. Tiruppoovanur; 104. Paadaaleeswaram; 105. Tirukkalar; 106. Tiruchitremam; 107. Tiru Usaattaanam; 108. Tiruidumbavanam; 109. Kadikkulam; 110. Tandalaineeneri; 111. Kottur; 112. Vanduturai; 113. Tirukkollampudur; 114. Pereyil; 115. Tirukkollikkadu; 116. Tenkoor; 117. Tirunellikka; 118. Tirunatyattankudi; 119. Tirukkarayil; 120. Kanraappur; 121. Valivalam; 122. Kaichinam; 123. Tirukkolili; 124. Tiruvaimur; 125. Tirumaraikkadu; 126. Tiru Agathiyan Palli; 127. Kodikkarai; 128. Kiliyanur; 129. Tiruvidaivai	1. Kachi Ekambam; 2. Kachi Metrali; 3. Onakanthan Thali; 4. Kachi Anekatangavadam; 5. Kachi Nerikkaaraikkadu; 6. Kuranganilmuttam; 7. Tirumaagaral; 8. Tiruvothur; 9. Panankattur; 10. Tiruvallam; 11. Thirumarperu; 12. Tiruvooral, Takkolam; 13. Ilambayankottur; 14. Tiruvirkolam; 15. Thiruvalangadu; 16. Tiruppaasur; 17. Tiruvenpakkam; 18. Tirukkallil; 19. Sri Kalahasti; 20. Thiruvotriyur; 21. Tiruvalithayam; 22. Vada Tirumullaivayil; 23. Thiruverkadu; 24. Tirumayilai; 25. Thiruvanmiyur; 26. Tirukkachoor; 27. Tiruvidaichuram; 28. Tirukalukundram; 29. Tiru Acharapakkam; 30. Tiruvakkarai; 31. Arasili; 32. Irumbai Maakalam	1. Aalavaai (Madurai); 2. Aappudaiyaar Kovil; 3. Tirupparankunram; 4. Tiruvedakam; 5. Tirukkodunkunram; 6. Tirupputhur; 7. Thiruppunavayil; 8. Rameswaram; 9. Tiruvadanai; 10. Tirukkaanapper; 11. Tiruppoovanam; 12. Thiruchuzhial; 13. Thirukutralam; 14. Tirunelveli	1. Tirunelvayil Aratturai; 2. Pennaagadam; 3. Goodalaiyatrur; 4. Erukkattampuliyur; 5. Tiruttinai Nagar; 6. Tiruchopuram; 7. Tiruvatikai; 8. Thirunaavalur; 9. Tirumudukunram; 10. Tirunelvennei; 11. Tirukkovilur; 12. Arankandanallur; 13. Tiruvidaiyaru; 14. Thiruvennainallur; 15. Tirutturaiyur; 16. Vatukur; 17. Tirumaanikkuzhi; 18. Thirupathiripuliyur; 19. Tirumundeeswaram; 20. Puravaar Panankattur; 21. Tiruvamathur; 22. Tiruvannamalai
Kongu Nadu	Malai Nadu	Eezha Nadu	Erumai Nadu	Vada Nadu
1. Avinaasi; 2. Thirumuruganpoondi; 3. Thirunana; 4. Kodimadachenkunoor; 5. Venchamaakoodal; 6. Paandikkodumudi; 7. Karuvoor Aanilai	1. Thiruvanchikulam	1. Tirukkonamalai; 2. Tirukketheeswaram	1. Gokarnam	1.Indraneelaparvatam (Nepal); 2. Anekatangavadam (Gowrikund); 3. Tirukkedaram (Kedarnath); 4. Tirukkayilaayam (Mount Kailash)
Tulu Nadu
1. Srisailam

== Pancha Bhuta Sthalams ==
This refers to the temples that are the manifestations of the five elements of the universe according to Hinduism: land, water, air, sky, and fire.

Category	Temple	Location
Land	Ekambareswarar Temple	Kanchipuram
Fire	Arunachaleshwarar Temple	Thiruvannamalai
Water	Jambukeswarar Temple	Thiruvanaikaval, Trichy
Sky	Thillai Nataraja Temple	Chidambaram
Air	Sri Kalahastheeswara Temple	Kalahasthi, Andhra Pradesh

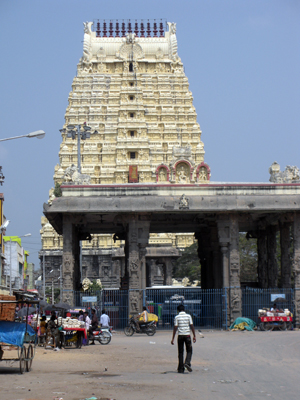
Ekambareswarar Temple, Kanchipuram (Land)

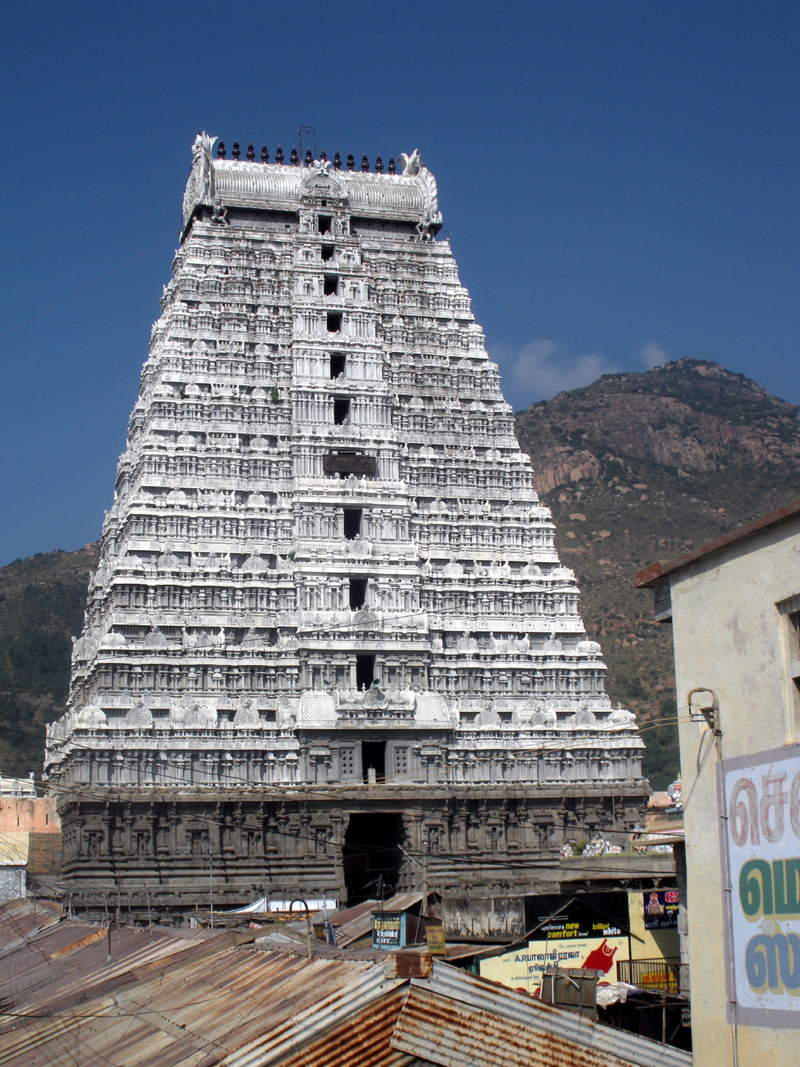
Arunachaleshwarar Temple, Thiruvannamalai(Fire)

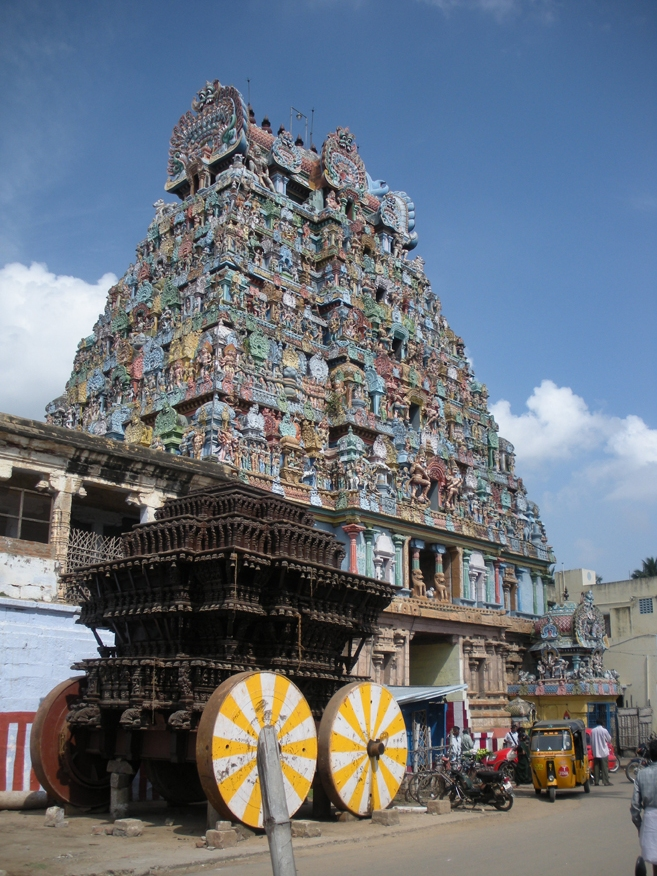
Thiruvanaikaval temple, Trichy (Water)

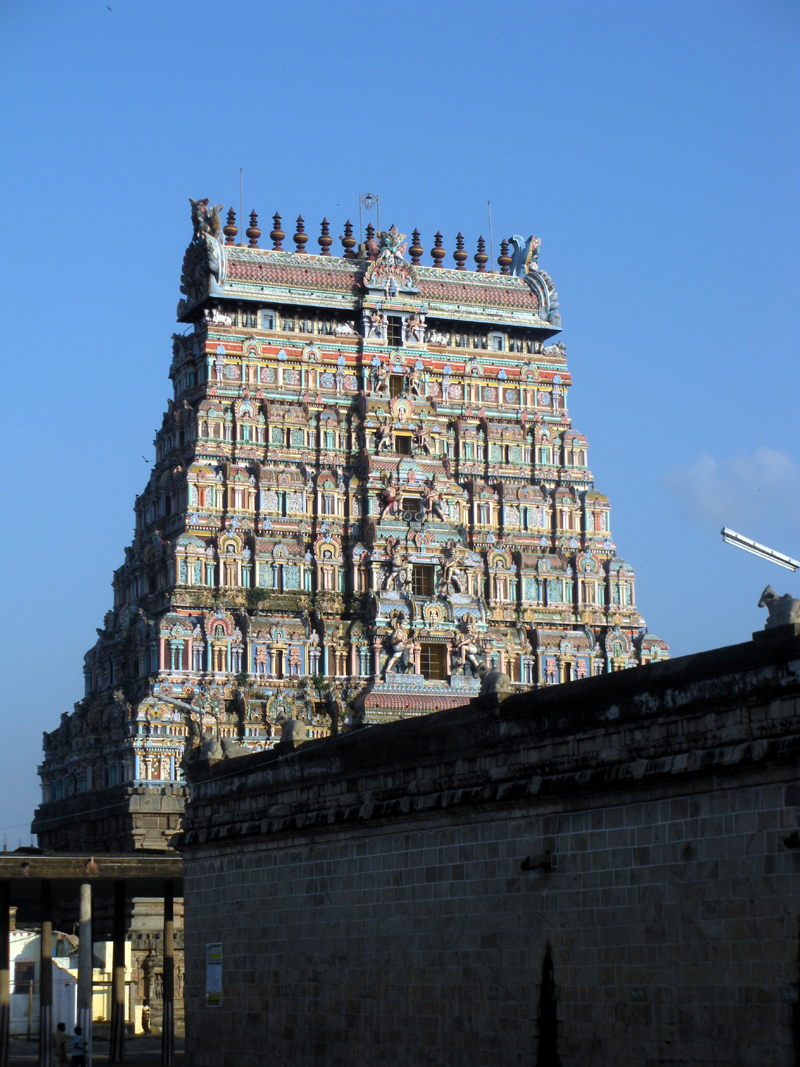
Chidambaram temple, Chidambaram (Sky)

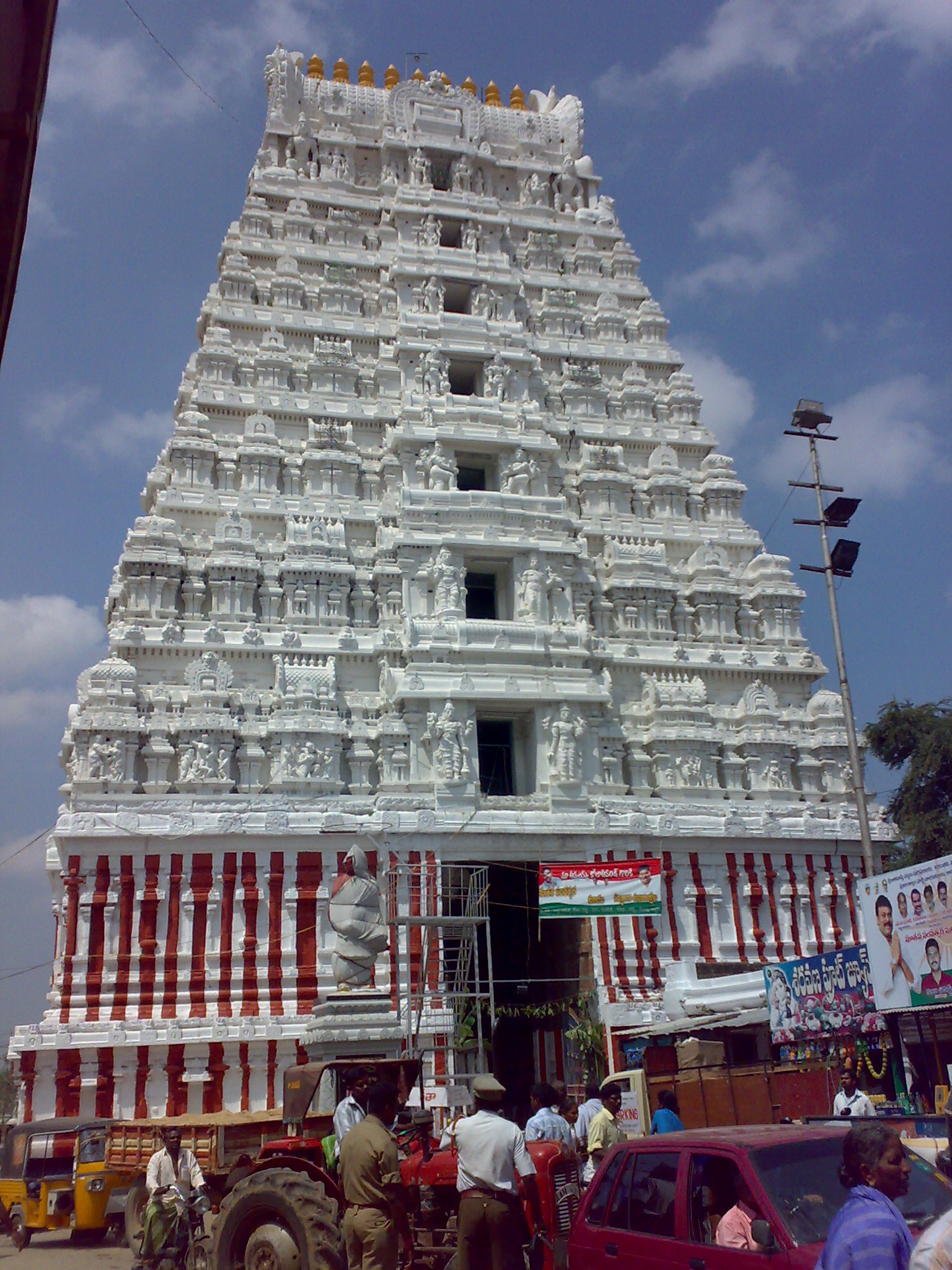
Kalahsti Temple (Air)

== Pancha Sabhai Sthalams ==
This is a category temples where Shiva is believed to have performed his cosmic dance called the tandava.

Category	Temple	Location	Element
Rathinachabai	Vada aaranyeswarar Temple	Thiruvalangadu	Emerald
Porchabai	Natarajar Temple	Chidambaram	Gold
Vellichabai	Meenakshi Amman Temple	Madurai	Silver
Thamirachabai	Nellaiappar Temple	Tirunelveli	Copper
Chithirachabai	Kutralanathar Temple	Thirukutralam	Art

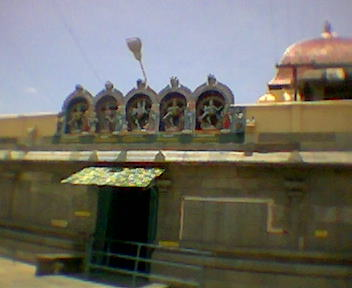
Thiruvalangadu temple, Chennai

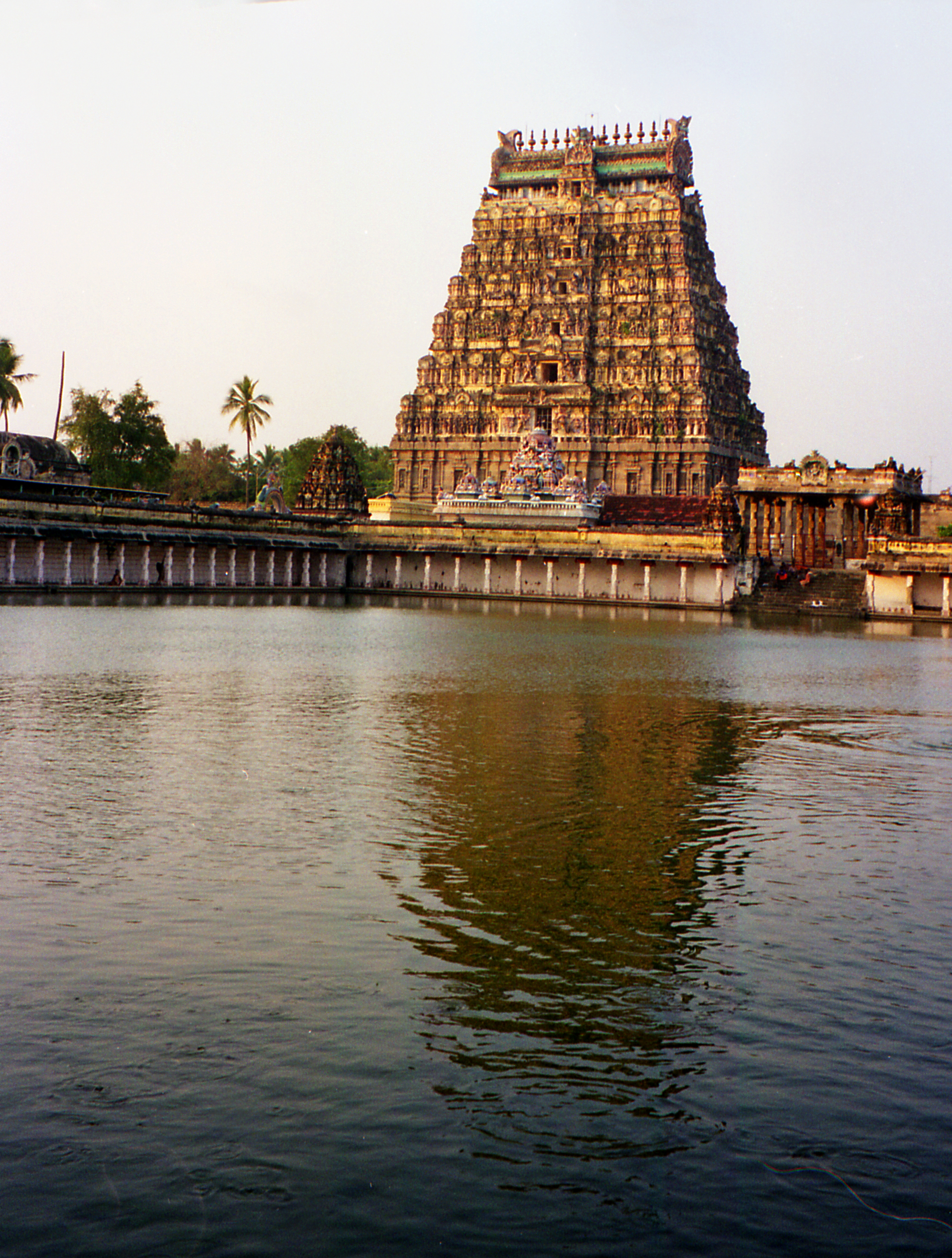
Chidambaram

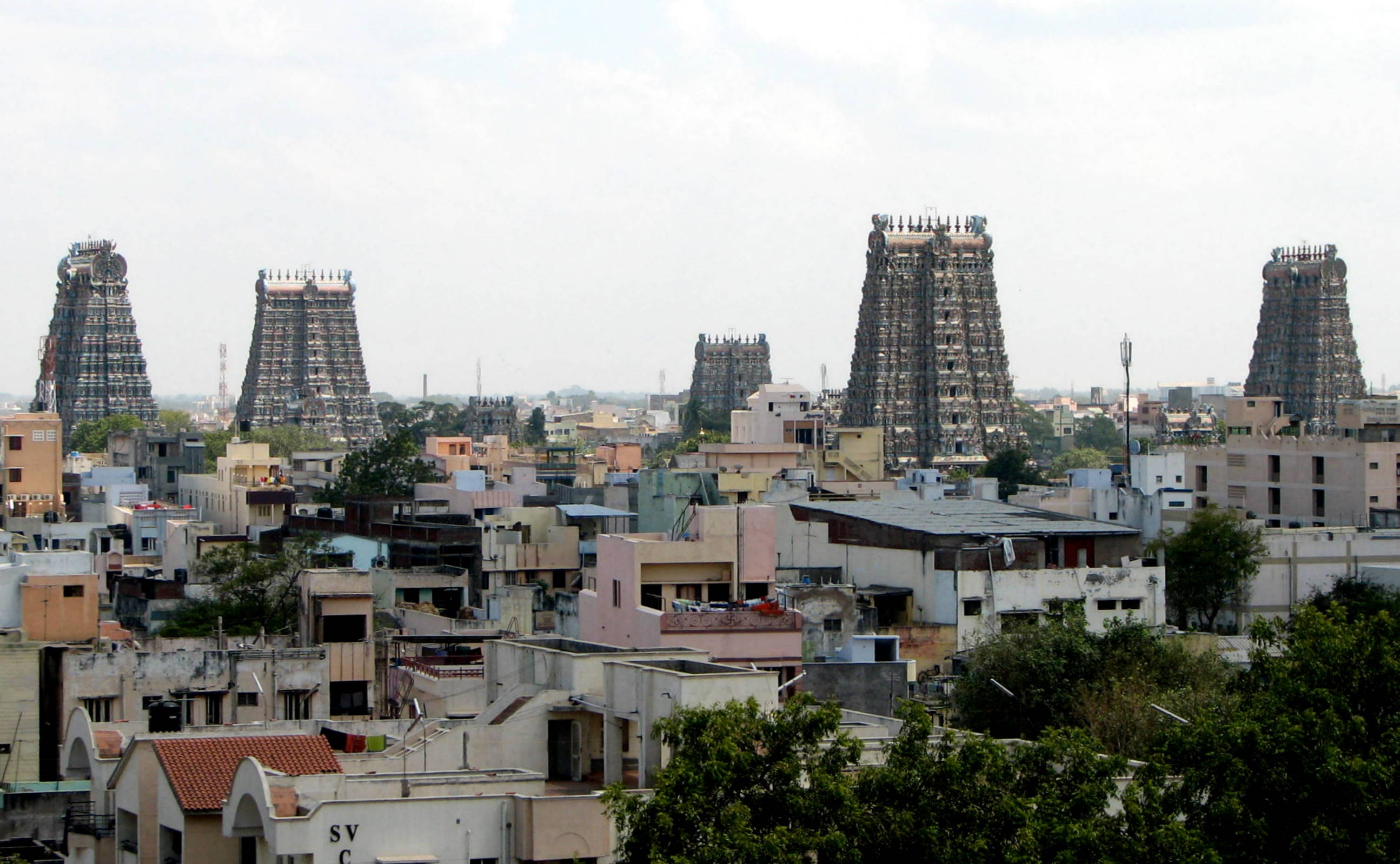
Madurai Temple

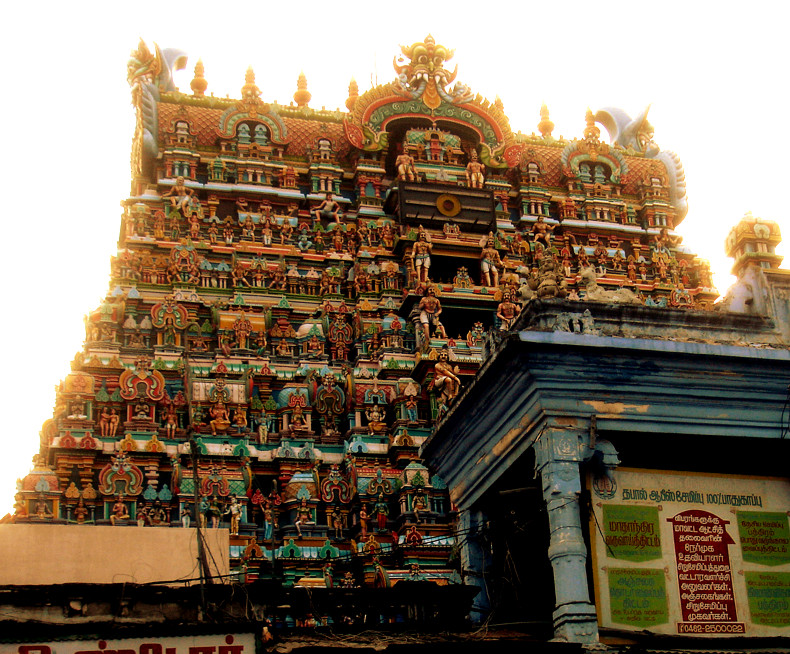
Tirunelveli temple

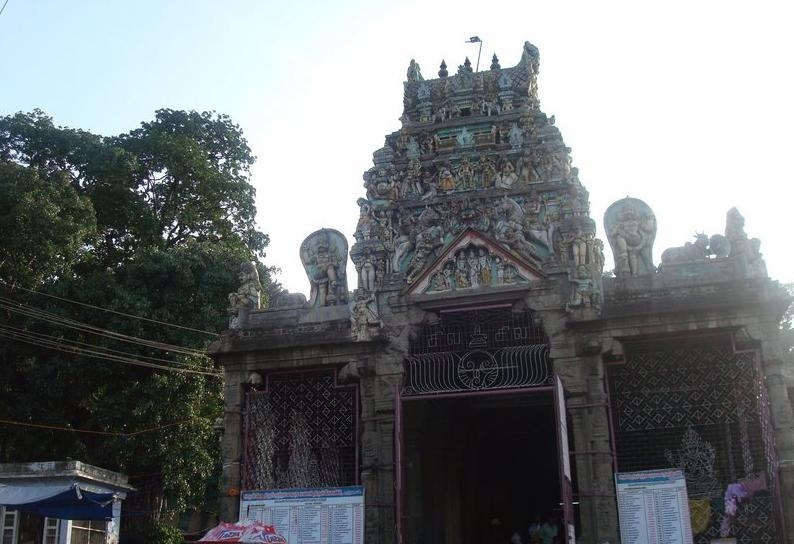
Thirukutralam

== Ashta Veerattam Sthalams ==
This category includes eight temples where Shiva is believed to have vanquished his foe. The eight temples are in 1. Thiruvadhikai 2. Thirukoyilur 3. Thirukkadayur 4. Vazhoovur 5. Thirukkurakaval ( kurukkai ) 6. Thiruppaliyalur 7. Thirukandiyur 8. Thiruvirkudi.

Temple	Foe	Location	District	Image
Tiruvadigai Veerattaaneswarar Temple	Tripurasura	Tiruvadigai, Panruti	Cuddalore district	
Korukkai Veeratteswarar Temple	Kamadeva	Tirukurukkai	Mayiladuthurai district	
Tirukkovilur Veerateshwarar Temple	Andhaka	Tirukoilur	Tiruvannamalai district	
Amirtagateswarar Temple	Yama	Thirukadaiyur	Mayiladuthurai district	
Vazhuvur Verateswarar Temple	Gajasura	Vazhuvoor, Mayiladuthurai	Mayiladuthurai district	
Keelaparasalur Veerateswarar Temple	Daksha	Tirupariyalur	Mayiladuthurai district	
Kandeeswarar Temple	Brahma	Thirukkandiyur	Thanjavur district	
Tiruvirkudi Veerataneswarar Temple	Jalandhara	Thiruvirkudi	Thiruvarur district	

== Sapta Vidangam ==
The Thyagarajar Temple at Tiruvarur is famous for the ajapa natanam (dance without chanting), that is executed by the deity itself. According to legend, a Chola king named Mucukunta obtained a boon from Indra (a celestial deity) and wished to receive an image of Thyagaraja Swamy (presiding deity, Shiva in the temple) reposing on the chest of reclining Vishnu. Indra tried to misguide the king and had six other images made, but the king chose the right image at Tiruvarur. The other six images were installed in ThiruNallaaru, Nagapattinam, Tirukarayil, Tirukolili, Thiruvaaimur and Tirumaraikadu. All the seven places are villages situated in the river Cauvery delta. All seven Thyagaraja images are said to dance when taken in procession (it is the bearers of the processional deity who actually dance). The temples with dance styles are regarded as Sapta Vidangam (seven dance moves) and the related temples are as under:

Temple	Vidangar Temple	Dance pose	Meaning	Image
Thyagarajar Temple, Tiruvarur	Vidhividangar	Ajaba Natanam	Dance without chanting, resembling the dance of Sri Thyagaraja resting on Vishnu's chest	
Dharbaranyeswarar Temple, Tirunallar	Nagaravidangar	Unmatha natanam	Dance of an intoxicated person	
Kayarohanaswamy Temple, Nagapattinam	Sundaravidangar	Vilathi natanam	Dancing like waves of sea	
Kannayariamudayar Temple, Thirukarayil	Adhividangar	Kukuda natanam	Dancing like a cock	
Brahmapureeswarar Temple, Thirukkuvalai	Avanividangar	Brunga natanam	Dancing like a bee that hovers over a flower	
Vaimoornaathar Temple, Tiruvaimur	Nallavidangar	Kamala natanam	Dance like lotus that moves in a breeze	
Vedaranyeswarar Temple, Vedaranyam	Bhuvanivividangar	Hamsapatha natanam	Dancing with the gait of a swan	

== Sapta Stanam ==
The sapthasthanam festival is conducted at Tiruvaiyaru during April every year. Hundreds of people witness the convergence of seven glass palanquins carrying principal deities of respective temples from seven places at Tiruvaiyaru. The palanquins are paraded near the car stand, the crowd witnessed the Poochorithal(flower festival) in which a doll offers flowers to the principal deities in the palanquins. After the Poochorithal, the palanquins leave for their respective places. The seven temples are

Temple	Place	District	Image
Aiyarappar temple	Thiruvaiyaru	Thanjavur	
Apathsahayar Temple	Tirupazhanam	Thanjavur	
Odhanavaneswarar Temple	Tiruchotruthurai	Thanjavur	
Vedapuriswarar Temple	Thiruvedhikudi	Thanjavur	
Kandeeswarar Temple	Thirukkandiyur	Thanjavur	
Puvananathar Temple	Thirupanturuthi	Thanjavur	
Neyyadiappar Temple	Tiruneithaanam	Thanjavur	

== Sapta Mangai Stalangal ==
The seven temples are:

Temple	Presiding deity/consort	Mangai	Location
Chakravageshwarar Temple	Chakravageshwarar/Devanayagi	Chakramangai	Chakkarapalli, Thanjavur
Arimutheeswarar Temple	Arimutheeswarar/Gnambikai	Harimangai	Ariyamangai, Thanjavur
Krithivageswarar temple	Krithivageswarar/Alangaravalli	Soolamangai	Soolamangalam, Thanjavur
Jambugeswarar Temple	Jambugeswarar/Akilandeswari	Nandimangai	Tirupullamangai, Thanjavur
Pasumangai Temple	Pasupatiswarar/Palvalainayagi	Pasumangai	Thirukkandiyur, Thanjavur
Chandramouleeswarar Temple	Chandramouleeswarar/Rajarajeswari	Thazhamangai	Thazhamangai, Thanjavur
Tirupullamangai Temple	Alandurainathar/Soundaranayagi	Pullamangai	Pullamangai, Thanjavur

== Aathara Stalam ==
Aathara Stalam indicates the places that serve as the personifications of tantric chakras associated with the human anatomy. Annamalaiyar temple is called the Manipooraga stalam associated with Manipooraga, regarded to be the human anatomical cause for spiritual ignorance, thirst, jealousy, treachery, shame, fear, disgust, delusion, foolishness, and sadness. Five temples are located in Tamil Nadu, one in Andhra Pradesh, and one at Varanasi.

Tantric Chakra	Description	Temple	Location	Symbol
Sahasrara	Above head	Madurai Meenakshi Temple	Madurai	
Ajna	Brain directly behind eyebrow	Kashi Vishwanath Temple	Varanasi	
Visuthi	Neck region near spine	Natarajar Temple	Chidambaram	
Anahata	Central channel behind spine	Sri Kalahastheeswara Swami Temple	Kalahasthi	
Manipooragam	Spine directly behind the navel	Arunachaleshwarar Temple	Thiruvannamalai	
Swathistanam	One's own abode	Thiruvanaikaval	Trichy	
Moolatharam	Basal end of the spinal	Thyagaraja Swamy Temple or Ekambareswarar Temple	Tiruvarur/Kanchipuram	

== Gallery ==
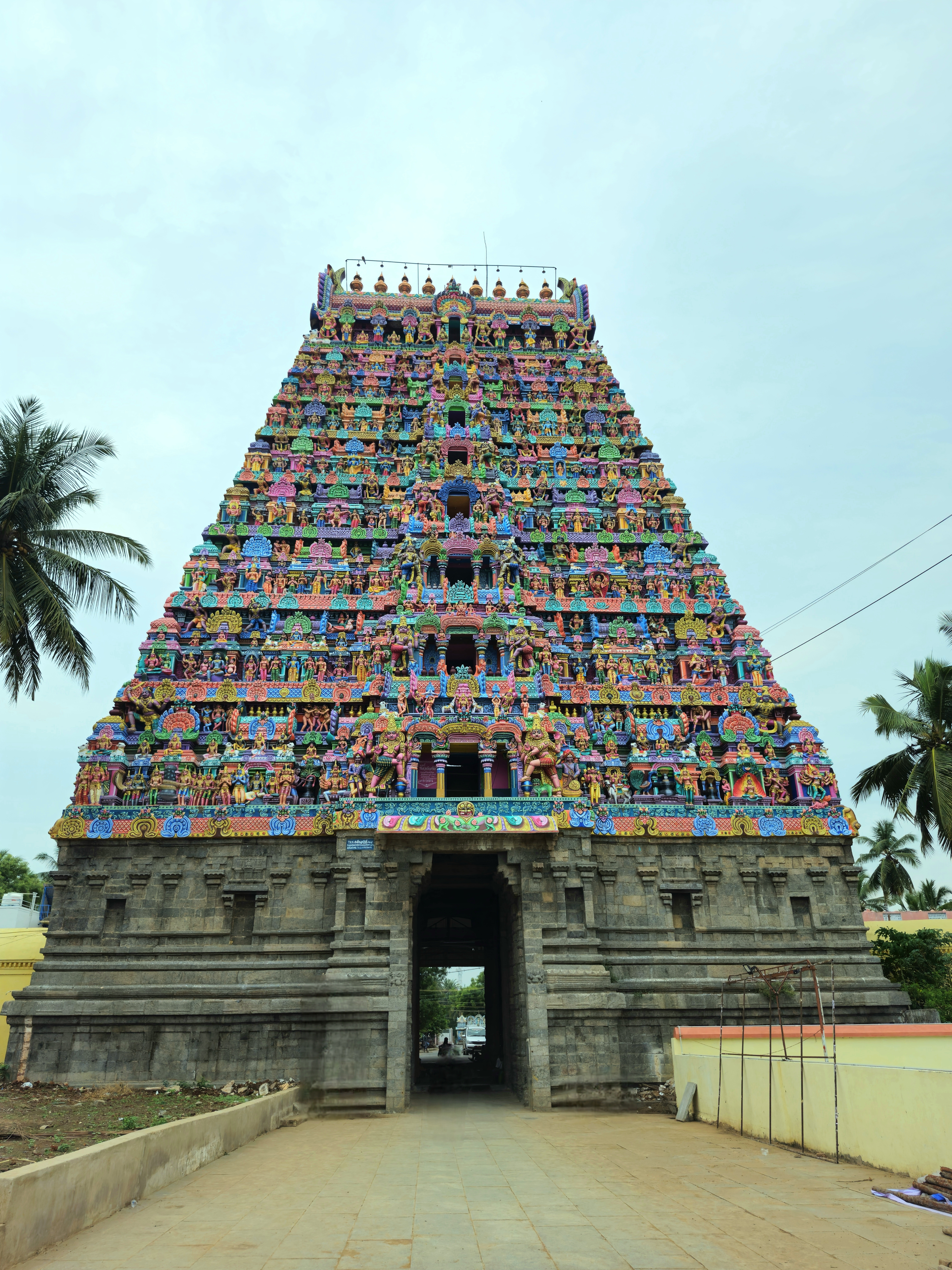
Mayuranathaswamy, Mayiladuthurai

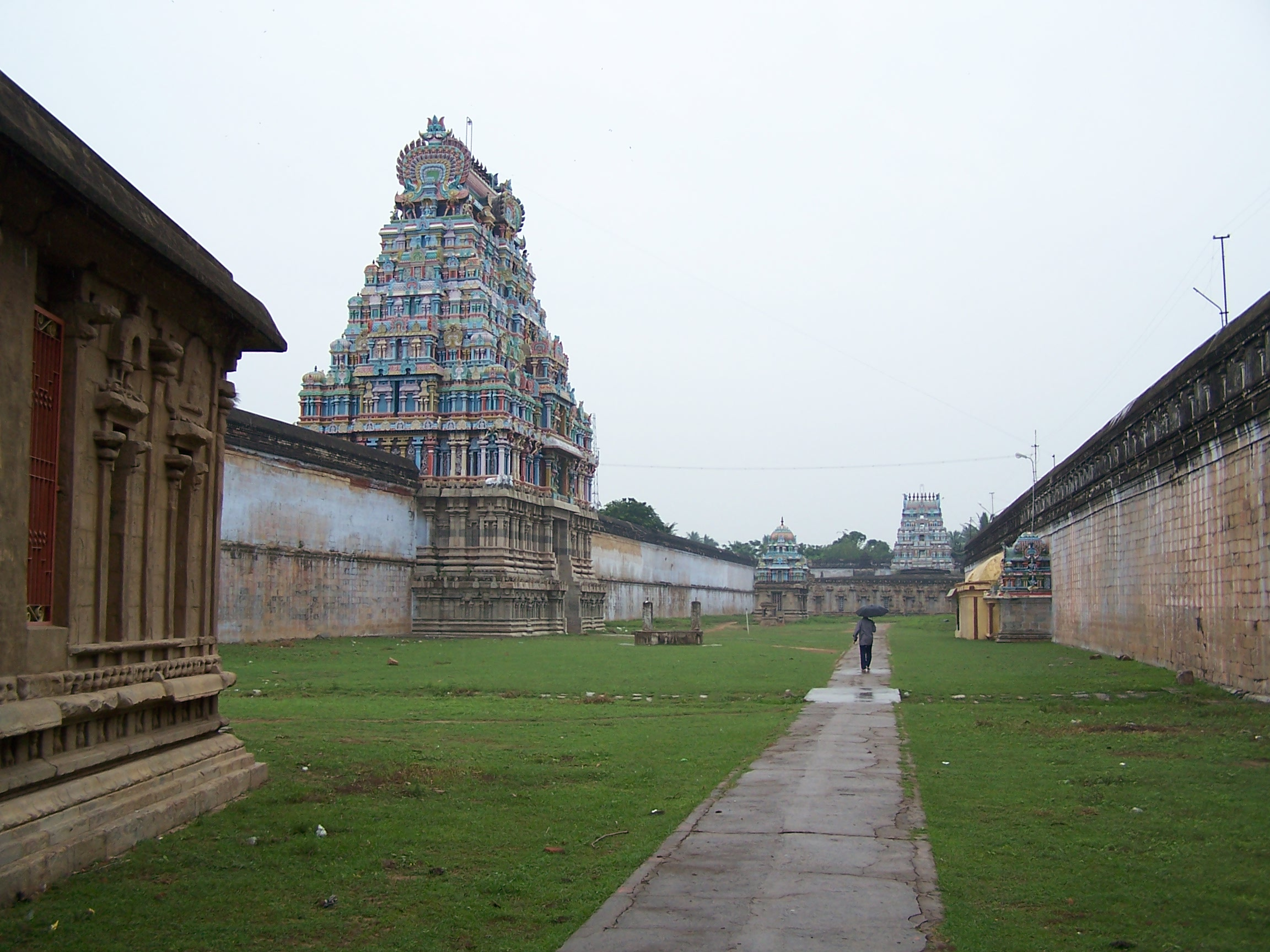
Thyagaraja Temple, Tiruvarur

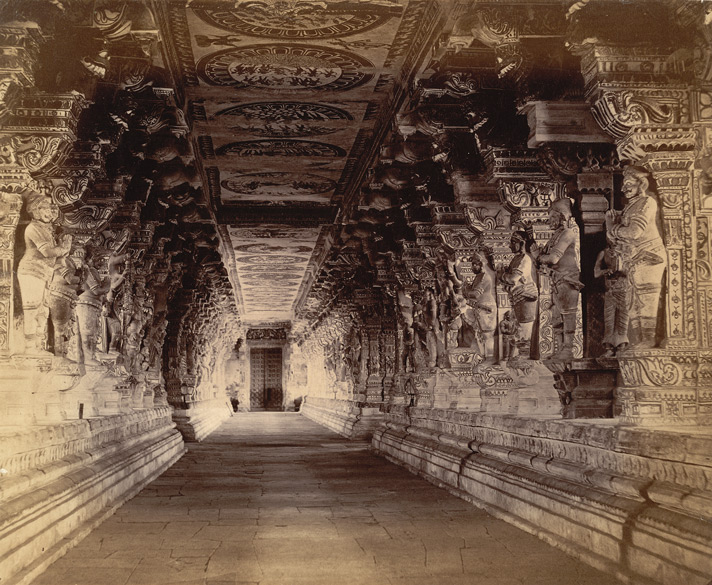
Rameshwaram temple

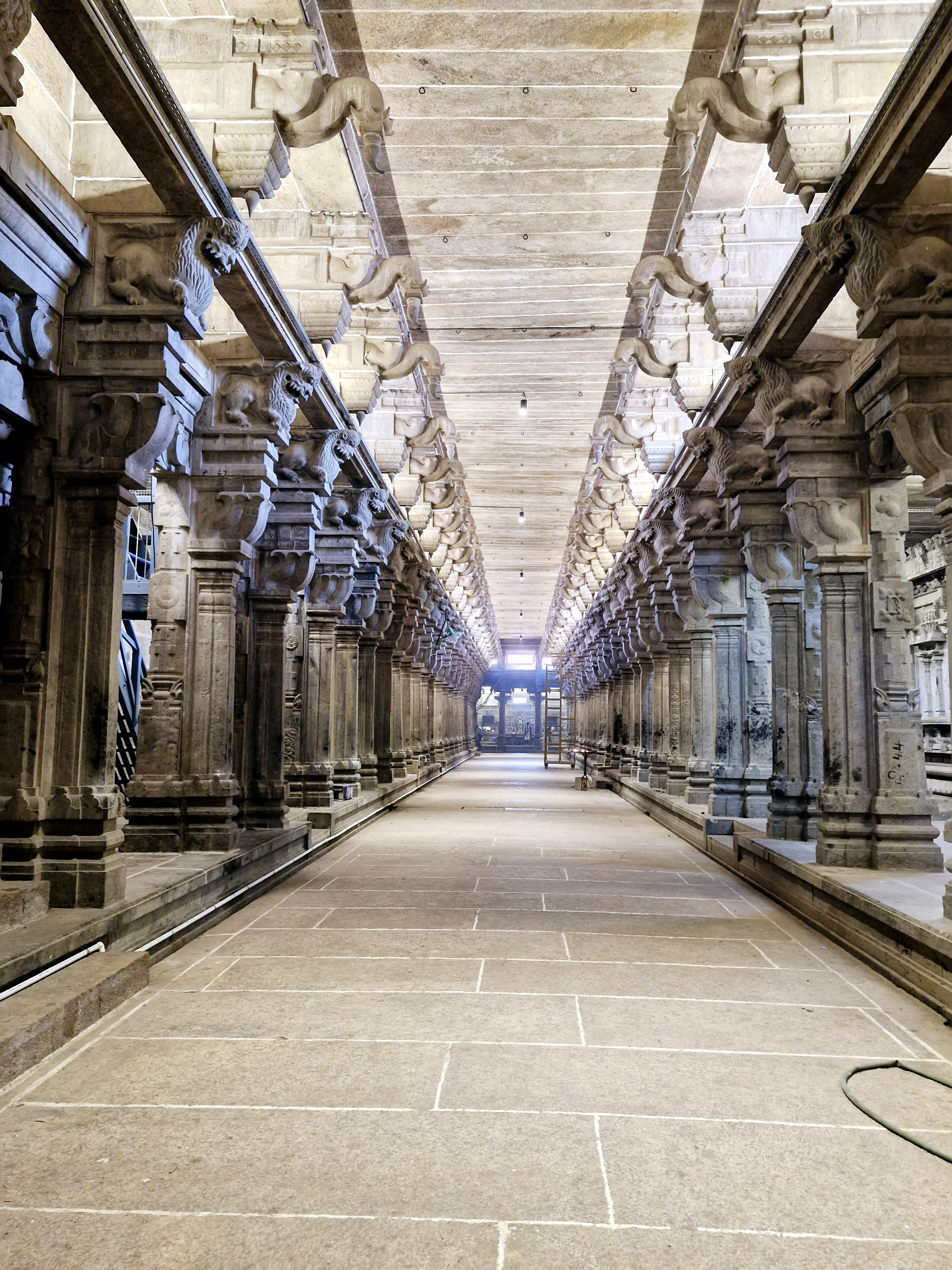
Mayuranathaswamy, Mayiladuthurai Prakaram

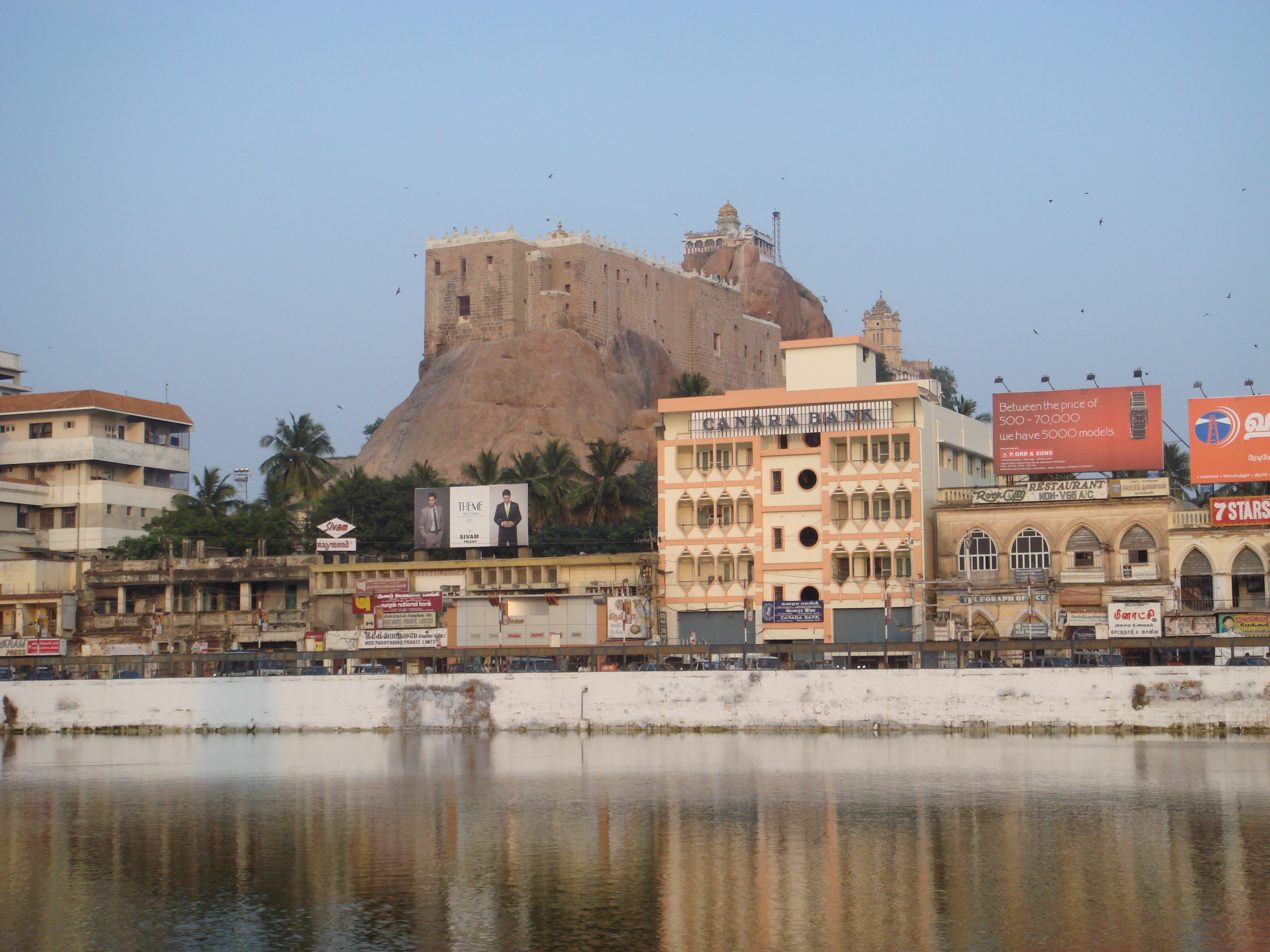
Rockfort temple, Trichy

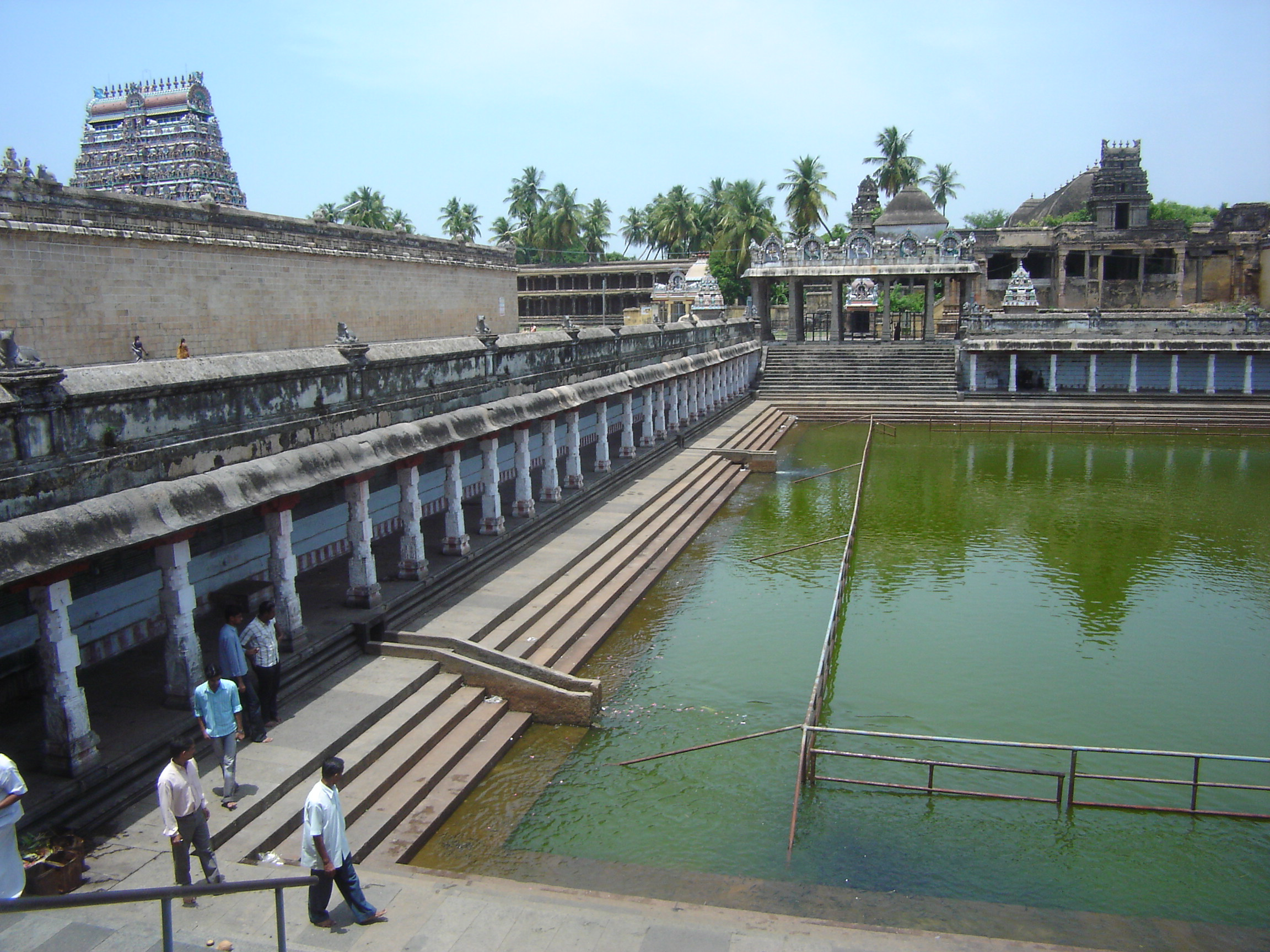
Chidambaram

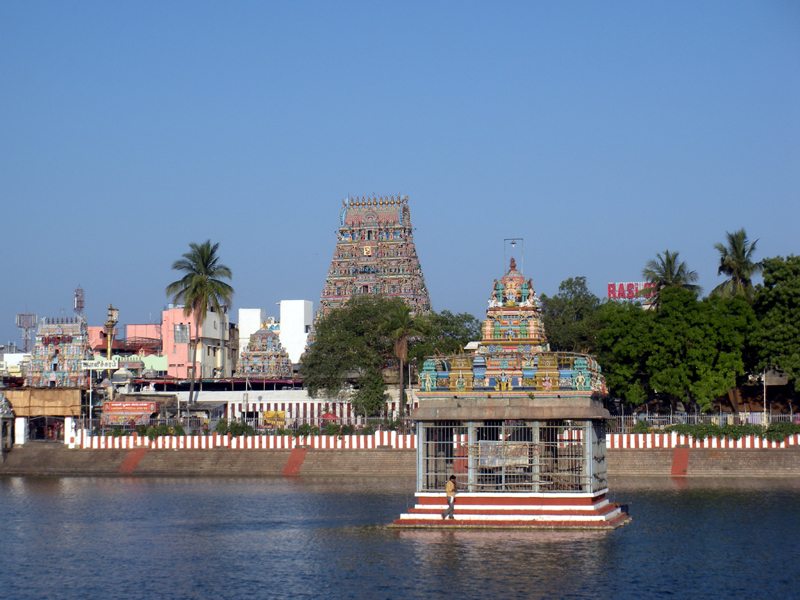
Kapaleeshwarar Temple, Mylapore, chennai

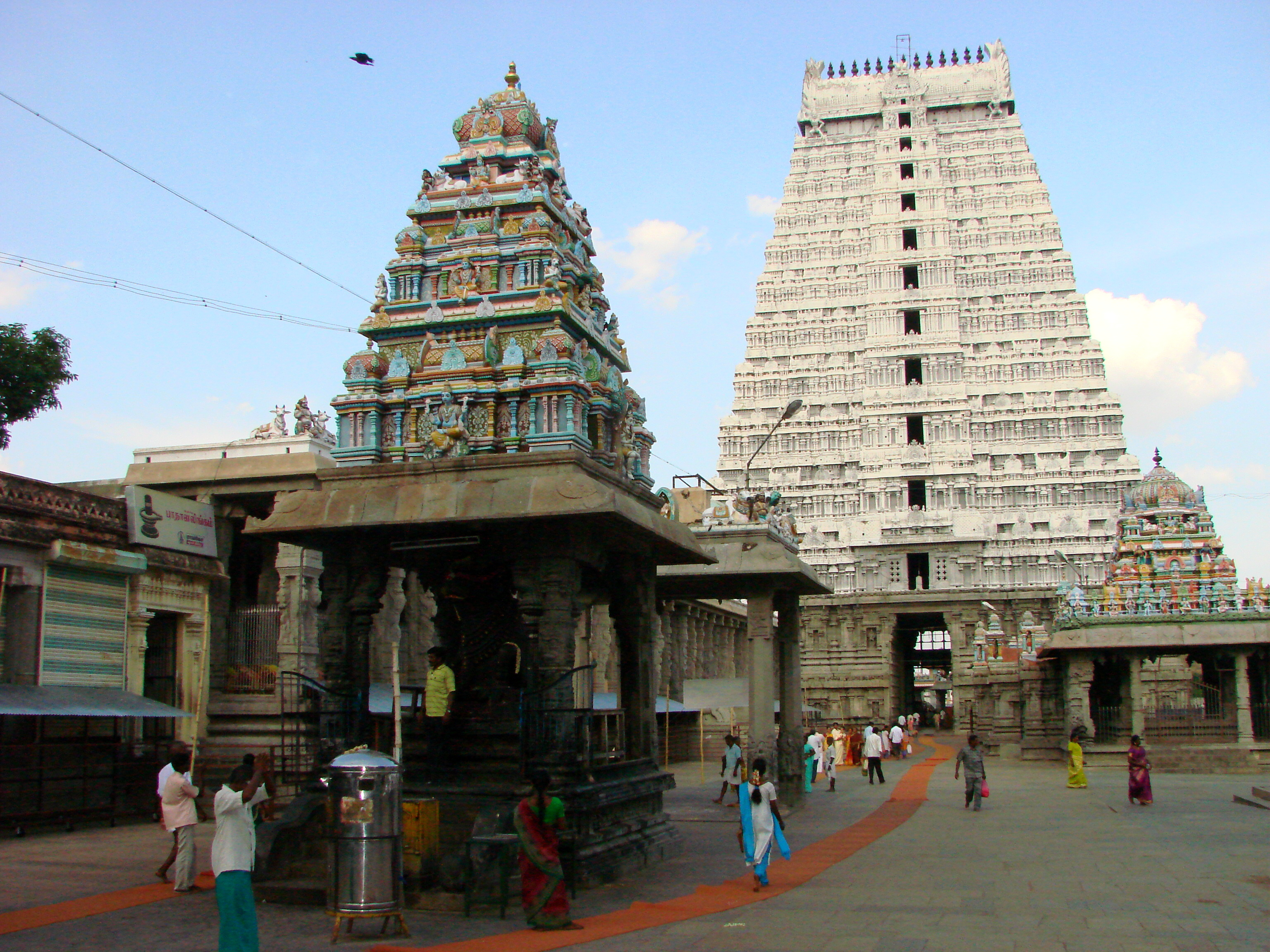
Tiruvannamalai temple

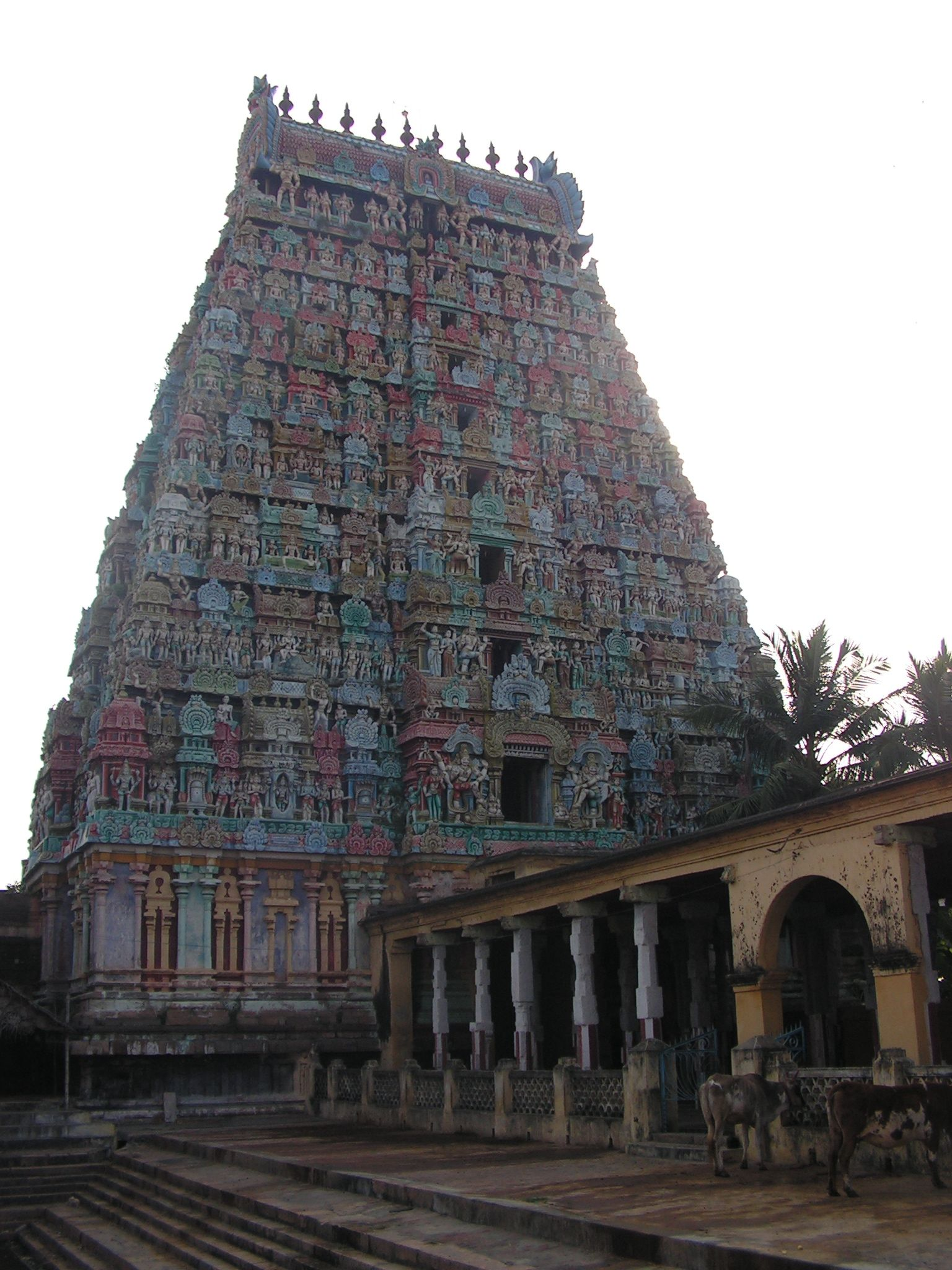
Adi Kumbeswarar Temple, Kumbakonam

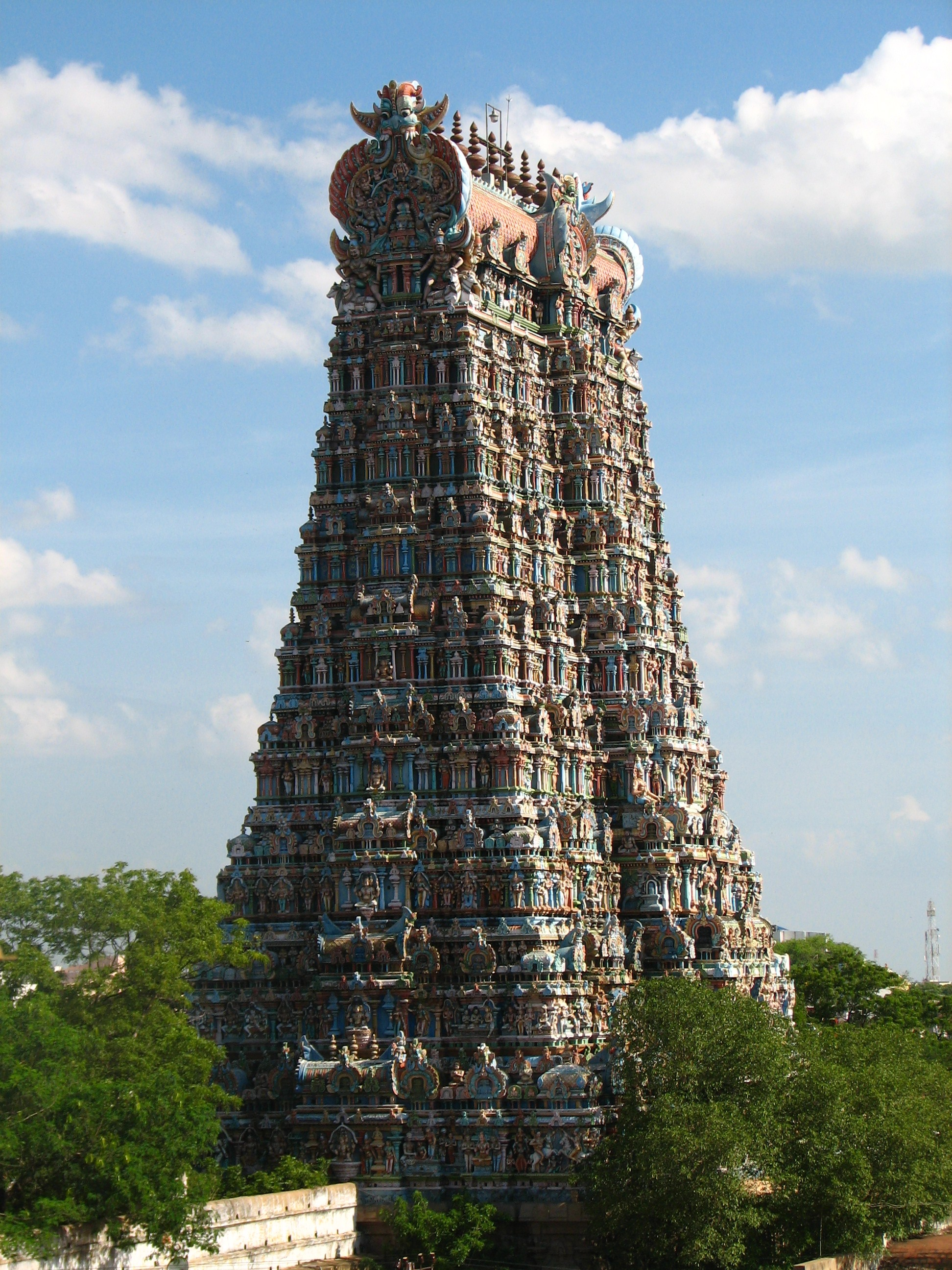
Madurai Meenakshi Amman Temple, Madurai

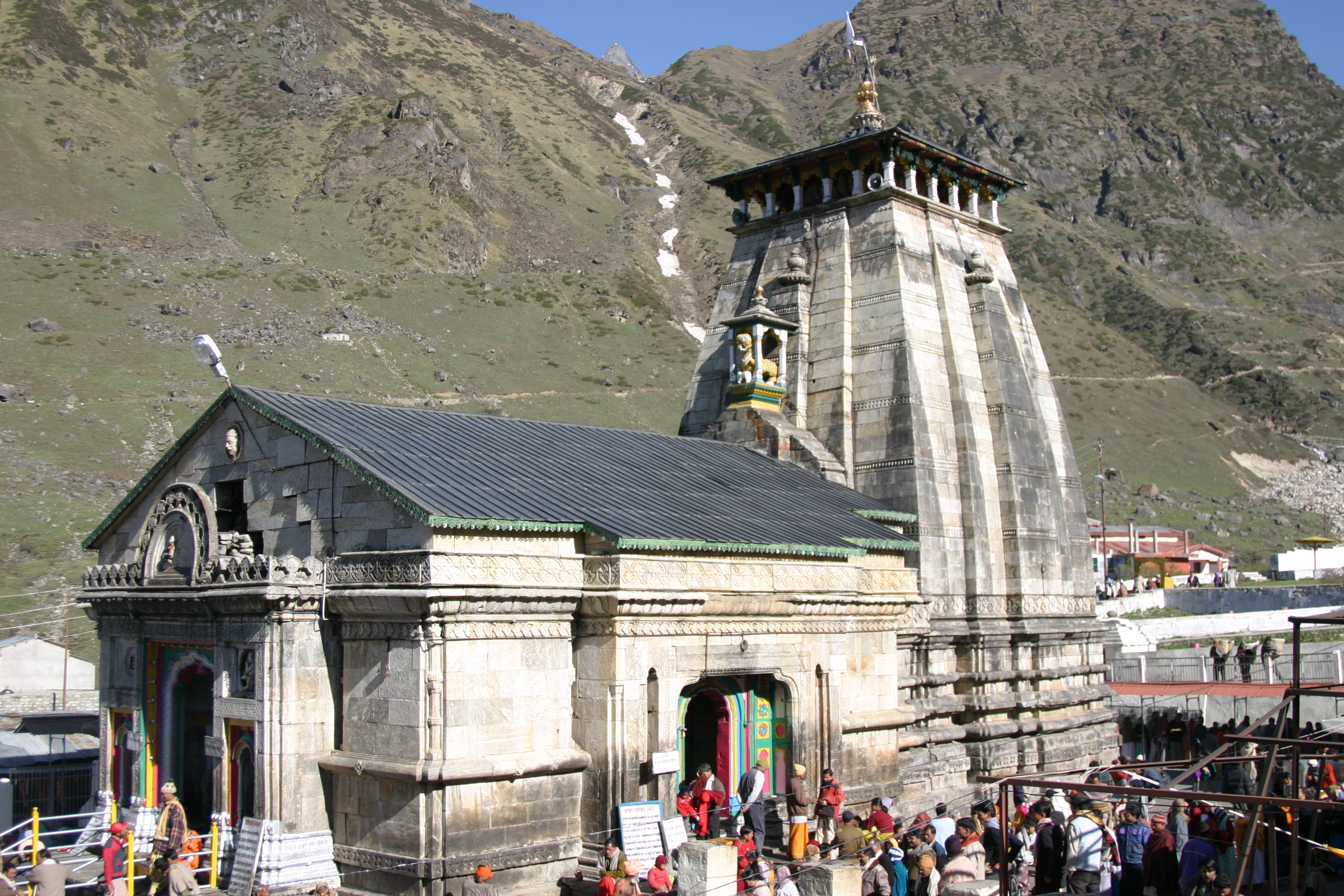
Kedarnath Temple

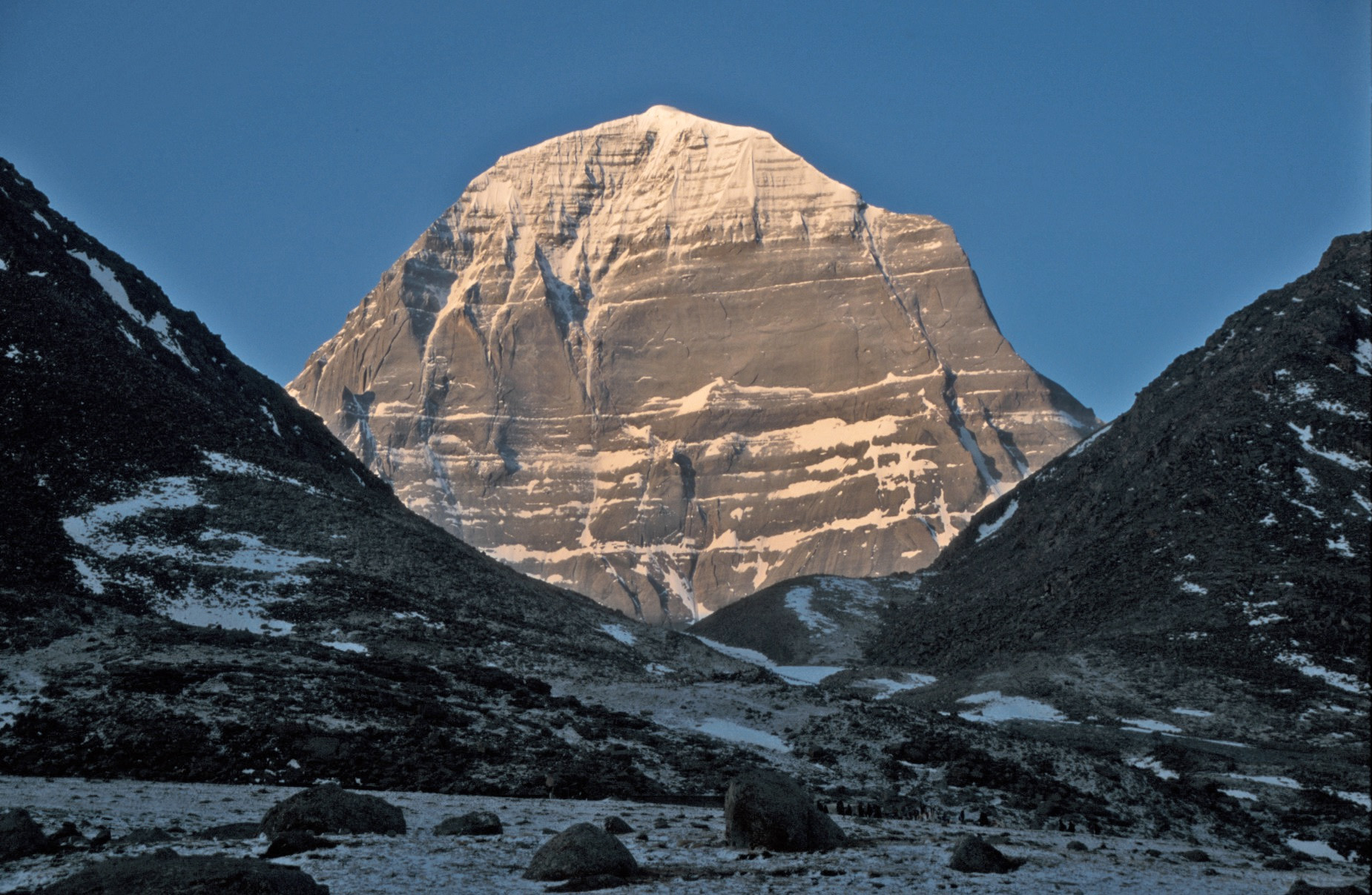
Kailash Hills, Kailash

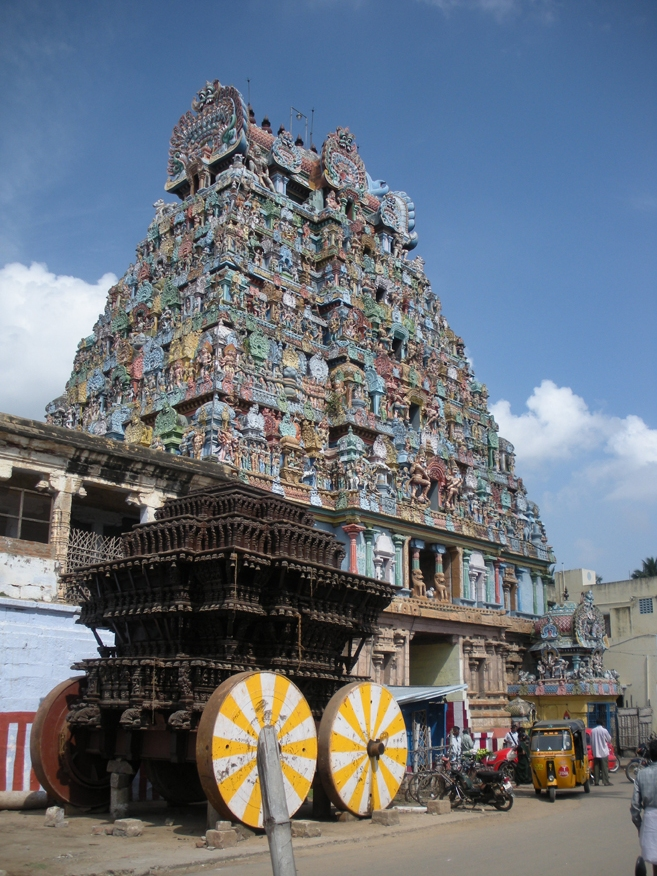
The Towering Rajagopuram with one of the Temple Cars

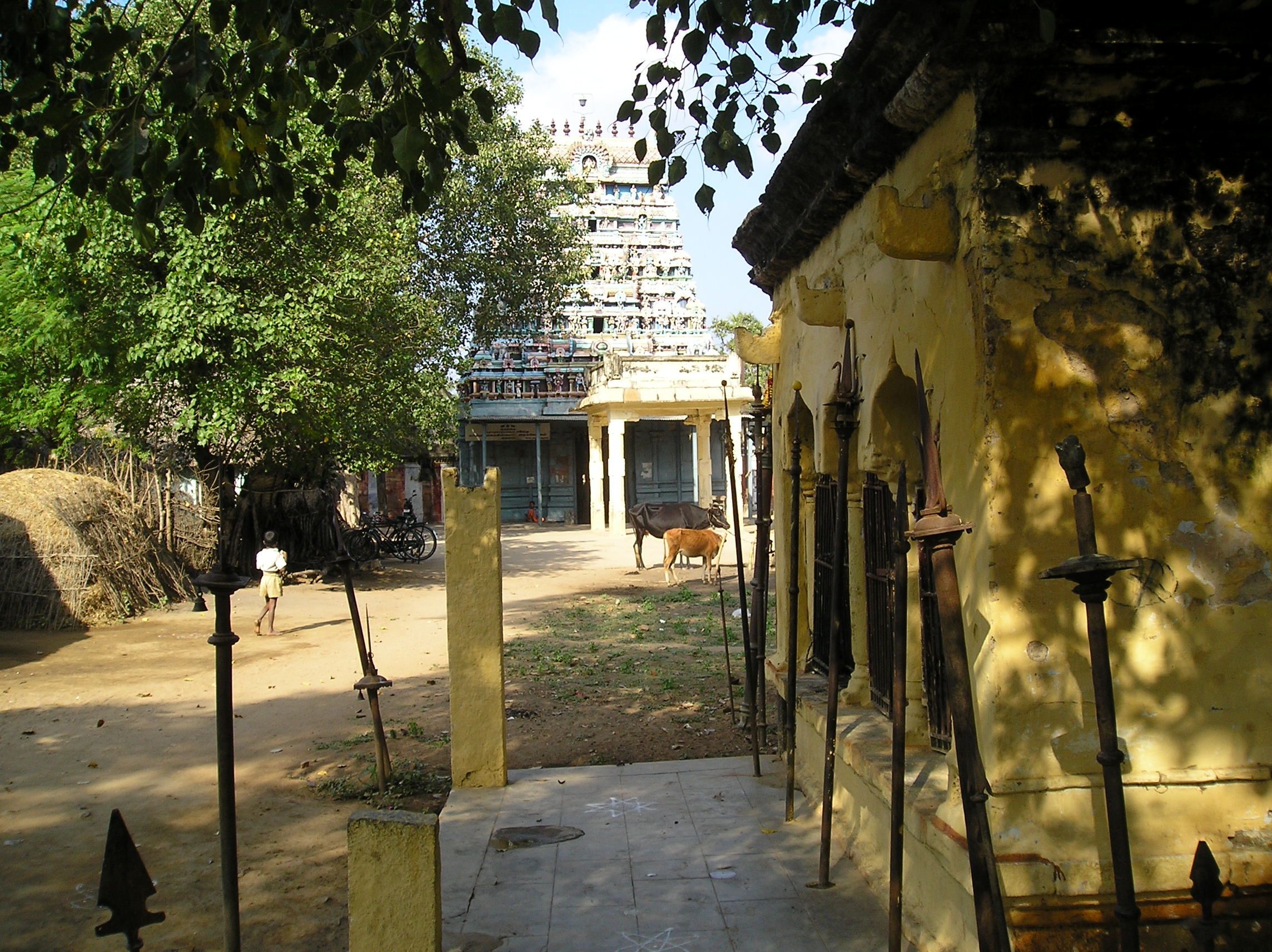
Thiruvasi Temple, Trichy

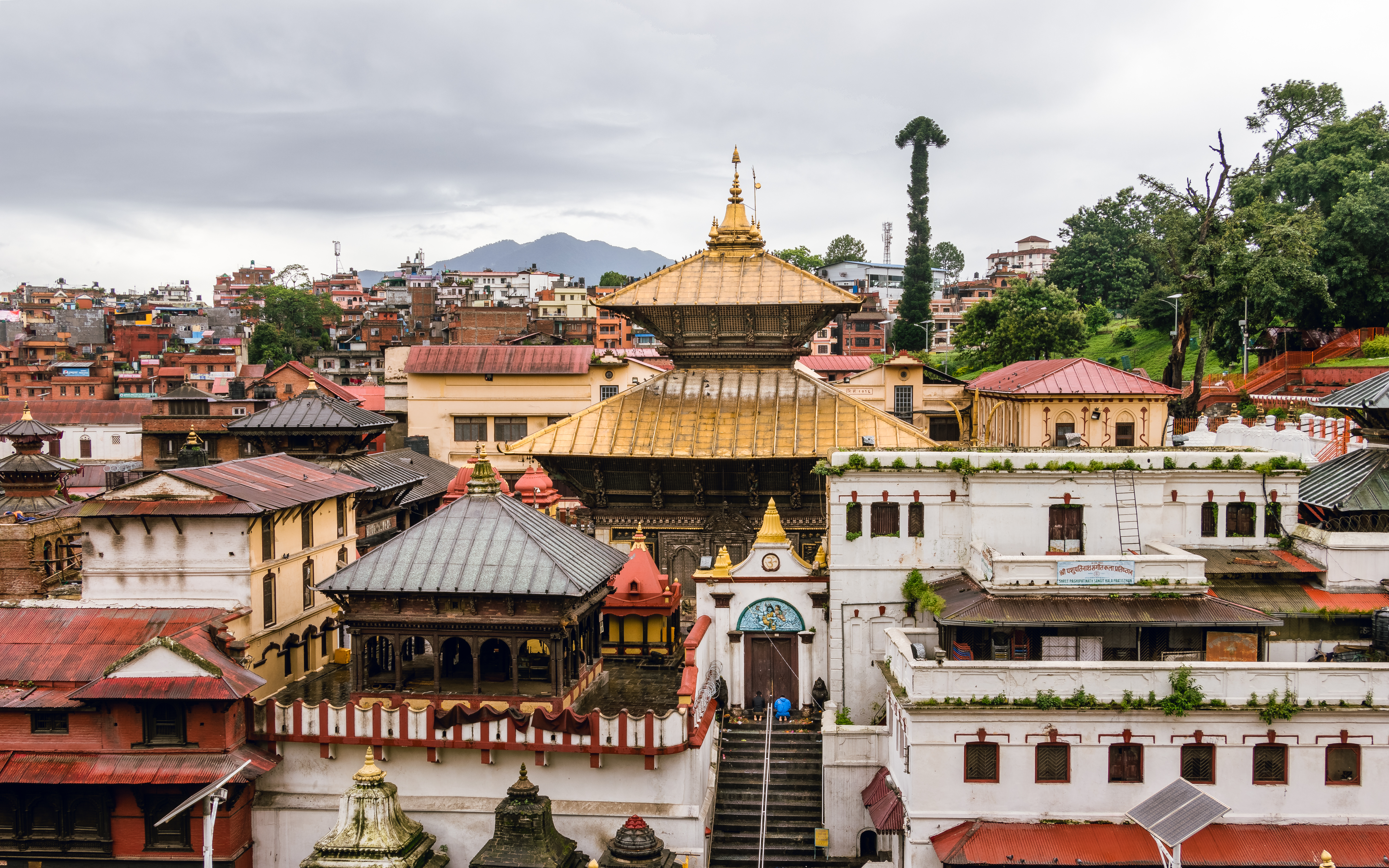
Pashupatinath Temple, Nepal

== See also ==
- Shiva Temples of Tamil Nadu
- Iconography of Shiva temples in Tamil Nadu

== External ==
- Map of padal petra stalam
- Padal petra stalam around Madurai
- Padal petra stalam around Kerala
- Padal petra stalam around Karnataka
- Padal petra stalam around Erode
- Padal petra stalam around Srilanka
