= Tirukattupalli Aranyeswarar Temple =

Hindu temple in Tamil Nadu, India

Tirukattupalli Aranyeswarar Temple (திருக்காட்டுப்பள்ளி ஆரண்யேஸ்வரர் கோயில்) is a Hindu temple located at Keezhai Tirukattupalli in Mayiladuthurai district of Tamil Nadu, India. The presiding deity is Shiva. He is called as Aranyeswarar. His consort is known as Akhilandeswari.

== Significance ==
It is one of the shrines of the 275 Paadal Petra Sthalams - Shiva Sthalams glorified in the early medieval Tevaram poems by Tamil Saivite Nayanar Tirugnanasambandar. The Devas are believed to have worshipped Shiva in this temple.

== Literary mention ==
Tirugnanasambandar describes the feature of the deity as:

பிறையுடை யான்பெரி யோர்கள்பெம்மான் பெய்கழ னாடொறும் பேணியேத்த

மறையுடை யான்மழு வாளுடையான் வார்தரு மால்கடல் நஞ்சமுண்ட
கறையுடை யான்கன லாடுகண்ணாற் காமனைக் காய்ந்தவன் காட்டுப்பள்ளிக்

குறையுடை யான்குறட் பூதச்செல்வன் குரைகழ லேகைகள் கூப்பினோமே.
