= Thirumakalam Mahakalanathar Temple =

Religion
- Affiliation: Hinduism
- District: Tiruvarur
- Deity: Lord (Shiva),

Location
- Location: Thirumakalam in Tiruvarur district
- State: Tamil Nadu
- Country: India

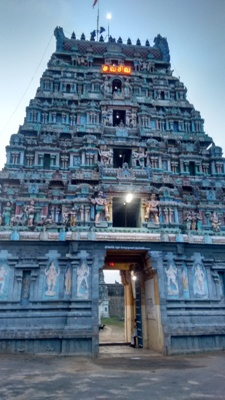
The entrance of the temple

Thirumakalam Mahakalanathar Temple(திருமாகாளம் மகாகாளநாதர் கோயில்) is a Hindu temple located at Thirumakalam in Tiruvarur district, Tamil Nadu, India. The presiding deity is Shiva. He is called as Mahakalanathar. His consort is known as Bayakshambikai.

== Significance ==
It is one of the shrines of the 275 Paadal Petra Sthalams - Shiva Sthalams glorified in the early medieval Tevaram poems by Tamil Saivite Nayanar Tirugnanasambandar.

== Literary Mention ==
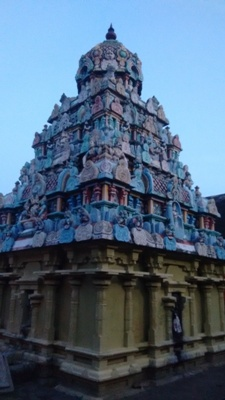
Vimana of the presiding deity

Tirugnanasambandar describes the features of the deity as:

கொலையார் மழுவோடு கோலச் சிலையேந்தி

மலையார் புனலம்பர் மாகா ளம்மேய
கிளரும் சடையணணல் கேடில் கழலேத்தத்

தளரும் முறுநோய்கள் சாருந் தவந்தானே.
