= Tirukkaanoor Semmeninathar Temple =

Hindu temple in Tamil Nadu, India

Tirukkaanoor Semmeninathar Temple (திருக்கானூர் செம்மேனிநாதர் கோயில்) is a Hindu temple located at Thirukanur in Thanjavur district of Tamil Nadu, India. The historical name of the place is Tirukanurpatti. The place is also called as Manalmedu. The presiding deity is Shiva. He is called as Semmeninathar. His consort is known as Sivayoganayaki.

== Significance ==
It is one of the shrines of the 275 Paadal Petra Sthalams - Shiva Sthalams glorified in the early medieval Tevaram poems by Tamil Saivite Nayanars Tirugnanasambandar and Tirunavukkarasar. The temple is counted as one of the temples built on the northern banks of River Kaveri.

== Literary Mention ==
Tirugnanasambandar describes the feature of the deity as:

விண்ணார்திங்கட் கண்ணிவெள்ளை மர்லை யதுசூடித்

தண்ணாரக்கோ டாமைபூண்டு தழைபுன் சடைதாழ
எண்ணாவந்தெ னில்புகுந்தங் கெவ்வ நோய்செய்தான்

கண்ணார்சோலைக் கானூர்மேய விண்ணோர் பெருமானே.

Tirunavukkarasar describes the feature of the deity as:

நீரும் பாரும் நெருப்பும் அருக்கனும்

காரும் மாருதங் கானூர் முளைத்தவன்
சேர்வு மொன்றறி யாது திசைதிசை

ஓர்வு மென்றில ரோடித் திரிவரே.
