= Tirttanakiri Sivakozhundeesvarar Temple =

Hindu temple in Tamil Nadu, India

Coordinates: 11.56918°N 79.67739°E

Tirttanakiri Sivakozhundeesvarar Temple (தீர்த்தனகிரி சிவக்கொழுந்தீசுவரர் கோயில்)is a Hindu temple located at Theerthanagiri in Cuddalore district, Tamil Nadu, India. The presiding deity is Shiva. He is called as Shivakozhundhu Easwarar. His consort is known as Oppila Nayaki.

== Significance ==
It is one of the shrines of the 275 Paadal Petra Sthalams - Shiva Sthalams glorified in the early medieval Tevaram poems by Tamil Saivite Nayanars Sundarar.
