= Karukudi Sargunalingeswarar Temple =

Hindu temple in Tamil Nadu, India

Coordinates: 10.924843°N 79.404113°E

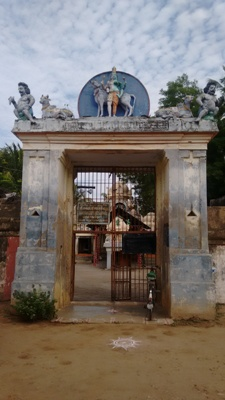
The entrance of the temple

Karukudi Sargunalingeswarar Temple (கருக்குடி சற்குணலிங்கேஸ்வரர் கோயில்)is a Hindu temple located at Karukudi in Thanjavur district, Tamil Nadu, India. The historical name of the place is Marudhanallur. The presiding deity is Shiva. He is called as Sargunalingeswarar. His consort is known as Advaita Nayaki.

== Significance ==
It is one of the shrines of the 275 Paadal Petra Sthalams - Shiva Sthalams glorified in the early medieval Tevaram poems by Tamil Saivite Nayanar Tirugnanasambandar.

== Literary Mention ==
Tirugnanasambandar describes the feature of the deity as:

சூடுவர் சடையினைக் கங்கை நங்கையை

கூடுவர் உலகிடை ஐயங் கொண்டொலி
பாடுவர் இசைபறை கொட்ட நட்டிருள்

ஆடுவர் கருக்குடி அண்ணல் வண்ணமே.
