= Tirutturaiyur Sishtagurunatheswarar Temple =

Hindu temple in Tamil Nadu, India

Tirutturaiyur Sishtagurunatheswarar Temple (திருத்துறையூர் சிஷ்டகுருநாதர்சுவாமி கோயில்)is a Hindu temple located at Thiruthuraiyur, Tamil Nadu 607205 in Cuddalore district, Tamil Nadu, India. The presiding deity is Shiva. He is called as Sishtagurunatheswarar. His consort is known as Thyagavalliammai.

== Significance ==
It is one of the shrines of the 275 Paadal Petra Sthalams – Shiva Sthalams glorified in the early medieval Tevaram poems by Tamil Saivite Nayanar Appar.
