= Kuranganilmuttam Valeeswarar Temple =

Hindu temple in India

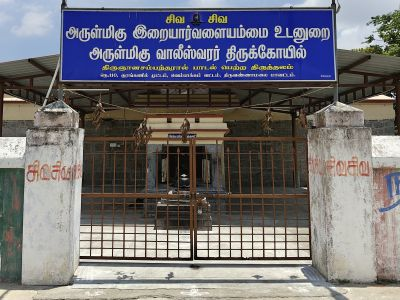
Main entrance

Kuranganilmuttam Valeeswarar Temple is a Hindu temple located at Kuranganilmuttam in Tiruvannamalai district, Tamil Nadu, India. The presiding deity is Shiva. He is called as Valeeswarar. His consort is known as Irayarvalai Ammai.

== Significance ==
It is one of the shrines of the 275 Paadal Petra Sthalams – Shiva Sthalams glorified in the early medieval Tevaram poems by Tamil Saivite Nayanar Sambandar. Here shiva was worshipped by Vali, Indra in the form of Anil (Squirrel) and Yama in the form of Muttam (Crow) so the place is called as "KuranganilMuttam". Since vali worshipped here, lord shiva is called as Vaaleeswarar. Parvati is called as Iraiyaarvalaiyammai.
