= Thirukolakka Sapthapureeswarar Temple =

Thirukolakka Sapthapureeswarar Temple (திருக்கோலக்கா சப்தபுரீசுவரர் கோயில்) is a Hindu temple located at Keezhai Thirukolakka in Mayiladuthurai district of Tamil Nadu, India. The historical name of the place is Sapthapuri. The presiding deity is Shiva. He is called as Sapthapureeswarar. His consort is known as Osai Kodutha Nayaki.

== Significance ==
It is one of the shrines of the 275 Paadal Petra Sthalams - Shiva Sthalams glorified in the early medieval Tevaram poems by Tamil Saivite Nayanars Tirugnanasambandar and Sundarar. Saint Sambandar is believed to have obtained a golden cymbal miraculously in this temple.

== Literary Mention ==
Tirugnanasambandar describes the feature of the deity as:

நிழலார் சோலை நீல வண்டினங்

குழலார் பண்செய் கோலக் காவுளான்
கழலான் மொய்த்த பாதங் கைகளால்

தொழலார் பக்கல் துயர மில்லையே.
