= Deivanayaka Easwarar Temple =

Coordinates: 13.003825°N 79.809278°E

Deivanayaka Easwarar Temple (தெய்வநாயக ஈஸ்வரர் கோயில்) or Arambeshwarar Temple is a Hindu temple located at Elumiyankottur near Perambakkam village in the Tiruvallur district of Tamil Nadu, India. The presiding deity is Shiva.

== Legend ==
It is one of the shrines of the 275 Paadal Petra Sthalams. According to legend, Shiva appeared to the Saivite saint Sambandar at this spot in the guise of an old man and commanded him to sing songs in praise of Shiva.

== Significance ==
The temple is dedicated to Shiva as "Deivanayaka Easwarar" or the god who commanded the forces of the Devas. The goddess is Kanakakujambikai. Cow puja is done regularly. The temple is praised by Sambandhar in the Thevaram.
