= Tiruvidaivasal Punniyakodiyappar Temple =

Hindu temple in Tamil Nadu, India

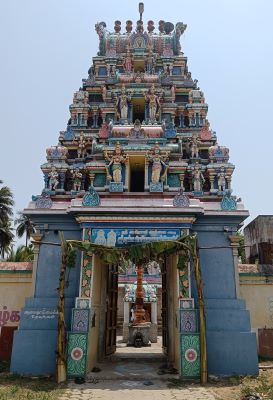

Religion
- Affiliation: Hinduism
- District: Tiruvarur
- Deity: Lord Shiva

Location
- Location: Kovilur in Tiruvarur district
- State: Tamil Nadu
- Country: India
- Interactive map of Tiruvidaivasal Punniyakodiyappar Temple

Tiruvidaivasal Punniyakodiyappar Temple is a Hindu temple located at Tiruvidaivasal in Tiruvarur district, Tamil Nadu, India. The temple is dedicated to Shiva, as the moolavar presiding deity, in his manifestation as Punniyakokdiyappar. His consort, Parvati, is known as Abiramani.

== Location ==
The sign for Tiruvidaivasal is located near Vennar bridge in Koradacheri-Koothanallur road. In that route one can reach the temple, at a distance of 2 km. This place is also known as Tiruvaidaivai or Tiruidaivai.

== Significance ==
The Tevaram pertaining to this temple was found in 1917 C.E. This temple was sung by Gnanasambandar and is a Paadal Petra Sthalam. Though the number of Teveram temples was referred to as 274 earlier, after the finding of this temple, the total number became 275. The temple tree is Kasturi Arali.
