= Karavera Nathar Temple =

Coordinates: 10.808785°N 79.580481°E

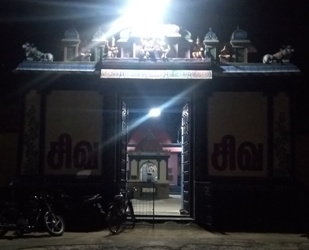
Entrance

Karavera Nathar Temple (கரவீரநாதர் கோயில்) is a Hindu temple located at Karaveram in the Tiruvarur district of Tamil Nadu, India. The presiding deity is Shiva.

== Significance ==
It is one of the shrines of the 275 Paadal Petra Sthalams. Sambandar, Sundarar and Thirunavukkarasar have sung hymns in praise of the temple. Unmarried women pray at the temple in order to get married.

== Gallery ==
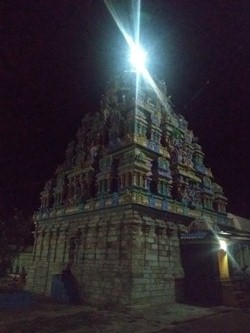
Vimana of the presiding deity

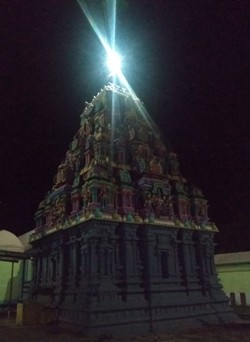
Vimana of the Goddess
