= Tirupayathangudi Tirupayatrunathar Temple =

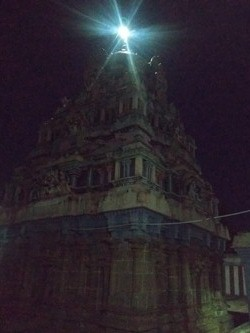
Vimana of the presiding deity

Tirupayathangudi Tirupayatrunathar Temple (Tamil: திருப்பயத்தங்குடி திருப்பயற்றுநாதர் கோயில்) is a Hindu temple located at Tirupayathangudi in Nagapattinam district, Tamil Nadu, India. The historical name of the place is Tirupayattrur.The temple is dedicated to Shiva, as the moolavar presiding deity, in his manifestation as Tirupayatrunathar. His consort, Parvati, is known as Kavianganni.

== Significance ==
It is one of the shrines of the 275 Paadal Petra Sthalams - Shiva Sthalams glorified in the early medieval Tevaram poems by Tamil Saivite Nayanar Tirunavukkarasar.

== Literary mention ==
Tirunavukkarasar describes the feature of the deity as:

மூவகை மூவர் போலு முற்றுமா நெற்றிக் கண்ணர்

நாவகை நாவர் போலு நான்மறை ஞான மெல்லாம்
ஆவகை யாவர் போலு மாதிரை நாளர் போலும்

தேவர்க டேவர் போலும் திருப்பயற் றூர னாரே.
