= Anniyur Agnipureeswarar Temple =

- Location in Tamil Nadu

Religion
- Affiliation: Hinduism
- District: Tiruvarur
- Deity: Lord Shiva

Location
- Location: Vanniyur
- State: Tamil Nadu
- Country: India
- Coordinates: 10°57′53″N 79°33′34″E

Architecture
- Type: Dravidian architecture

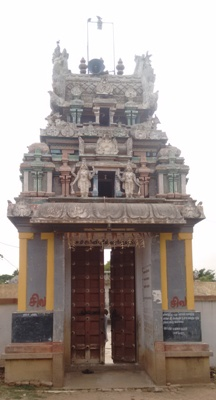
Rajagopura

Anniyur Agnipureeswarar Temple (அன்னியூர் அக்கினிபுரீஸ்வரர் கோயில்) is a Hindu temple located at Vanniyur in Tiruvarur district, Tamil Nadu, India. The presiding deity is Shiva. He is called as Agnipureeswarar. His consort is known as Gowri Parvathi.

== Significance ==
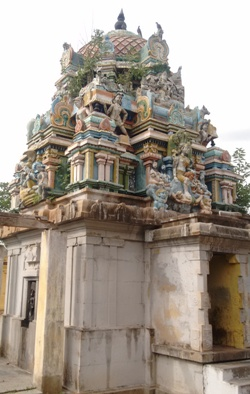
Vimana of the presiding deity

It is one of the shrines of the 275 Paadal Petra Sthalams - Shiva Sthalams glorified in the early medieval Tevaram poems by Tamil Saivite Nayanar Tirunavukkarasar.

== Literary mention ==
Tirunavukkarasar describes the feature of the deity as:

காலை போய்ப்பலி தேர்வர்கண் ணார்நெற்றி

மேலை வானவர் வந்து விரும்பிய
சோலை சூழ்புறங் காடரங் காகவே

ஆலின் கீழறத் தாரன்னி யூரரே.
