= Tiruneivanai Swarnakadeswarar Temple =

Hindu temple in Tamil Nadu, India

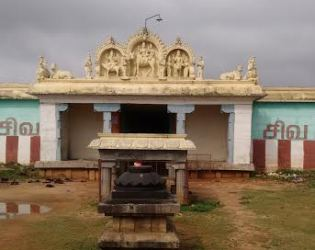
The entrance of the temple

Thirunelvennai Sri Swarnakadeswarar Temple (நெய்வணை சொர்ணகடேஸ்வரர் கோயில்)is a Hindu temple located at Neivanai in Villupuram district, Tamil Nadu, India. The presiding deity is Shiva. He is called as Swarnakadeswarar. His consort is known as Neelamalar Kanniammai.Gurukkal mobile number 7826-090451

== Significance ==
It is one of the shrines of the 275 Paadal Petra Sthalams – Shiva Sthalams glorified in the early medieval Tevaram poems by Tamil Saivite Nayanar Sambandar.
