= Karpaganatharkulam Karpaganathar Temple =

Shiva temple in Tamil Nadu, India

Coordinates: 10.42°N 79.59°E

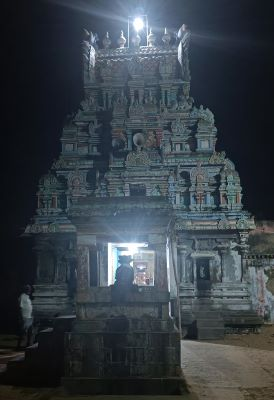
Entrance

Karpaganatharkulam Karpaganathar Temple (கற்பகநாதர்குளம் கற்பகநாதர் கோயில்) is a Hindu temple located at Karpaganatharkulam in Tiruvarur district, Tamil Nadu, India. The temple is dedicated to Shiva, as the moolavar presiding deity, in his manifestation as Karpaganathar. His consort, Parvati, is known as Balasundari. The historical name of the place is Tirukadikulam.

== Significance ==
It is one of the shrines of the 275 Paadal Petra Sthalams - Shiva Sthalams glorified in the early medieval Tevaram poems by Tamil Saivite Nayanar Tirugnanasambandar. The main idol is a shivalinga is hexagonal in shape.
