= Ponvaithanathar Temple =

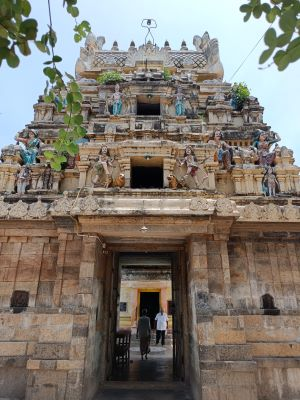

Religion
- Affiliation: Hinduism
- District: Tiruvarur
- Deity: Lord Shiva

Location
- Location: Aalathampadi between Thiruvarur and Thiruthuraipoondi
- State: Tamil Nadu
- Country: India

Ponvaithanathar Temple (பொன்வைத்தநாதர் கோயில்) is a Hindu temple located near Aalathampadi between Thiruvarur and Thiruthuraipoondi in the Tiruvarur district of Tamil Nadu, India.

== Significance ==
It is one of the shrines of the 275 Paadal Petra Sthalams. Praises of the temple have been sung by the Saivite saints Appar and Sundarar.
