= Tiruppanangadu Talapurisvarar Temple =

Temple dedicated to Lord Shiva in Tamil Nadu

Coordinates: 12.8009°N 79.6135°E

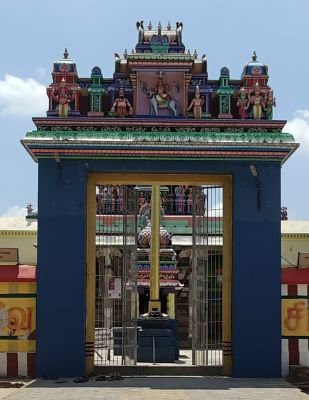

Tiruppanangadu Talapurisvarar Temple is a Shiva temple located at Tiruppanangadu in Tiruvannamalai district of Tamil Nadu, India. This is sung by Sundarar and is classified as Paadal Petra Sthalam

== Presiding deity ==
The temple has two presiding deities known as Talapurisvarar (Panangattisvarar) and Kirubapurisvarar. Their consorts are known as Kirubanayaki and Amirtavalli. The temple tree is palm tree. The historical name of the place is Vanpartthan Panangattur.

== Festivals ==
Among others, Brahmotsavam in Tamil month of Masi or Māci, Annabishegam (ceremony of pouring boiled rice over an idol in a temple) in October-November, and Arudra Darshan in December-January are held in this temple.
