= Valampurinathar Temple =

Valampuranathar Temple
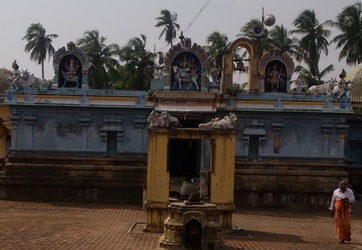

Religion
- Affiliation: Hinduism
- District: Mayiladuthurai
- Deity: Valampurinathar(Shiva)

Location
- Location: Thiruvalampuram
- State: Tamil Nadu
- Country: India
- Interactive map of Valampuranathar Temple
- Coordinates: 11.13816°N 79.80934°E

Architecture
- Type: Dravidian architecture

The Valampurinathar Temple is a Hindu temple dedicated to Lord Siva located in Melaperumpallam, Thiruvalampuram in Mayiladuthurai district, Tamil Nadu, India. It situated close to Puhar and Thiruvenkadu. The temple dates back to the Medieval Cholas period.

== Speciality ==
The temple is revered by the Thevaram hymns of Saiva nayanars, 7th century Tamil saint poets and classified as Paadal Petra Sthalam. The presiding deity is Shiva. He is called as Valampuranathar. His consort is known as Vaduvakirkanni. The temple is counted as one of the temples built on the banks of River Kaveri. This temple has samadhi of Herananda Maharishi and is called Ganapathy Sthalam
