= Tiruvasi Mattruraivaradeswarar Temple =

Matruraivaradheeswarar Temple
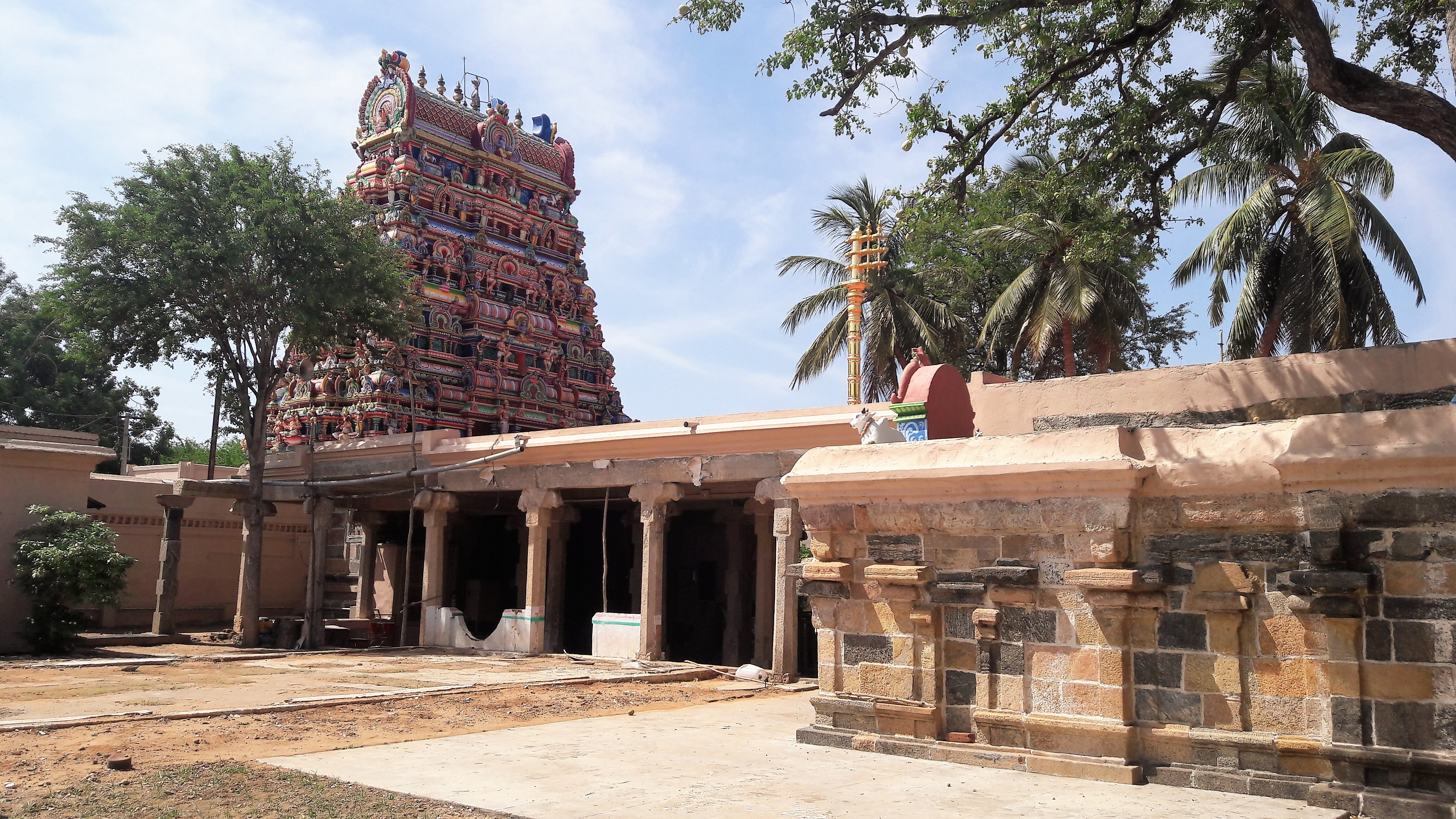
- Mattruraivaradheeswarar Temple, Thiruvasi, Tiruchirappalli district, Tamil Nadu

- Mattruraivaradheeswarar Temple, Thiruvasi, Tiruchirappalli district, Tamil Nadu

Religion
- Affiliation: Hinduism
- District: Tiruchirappalli
- Deity: Mattruraivaradheeswarar
- Festival: Maha Shivaratri

Location
- Location: Thiruvasi
- State: Tamil Nadu
- Country: India
- Coordinates: 10.8905°N 78.6652°E

Architecture
- Type: Dravidian architecture
- Completed

Specifications
- Temple: One
- Elevation: 94.21 m (309 ft)

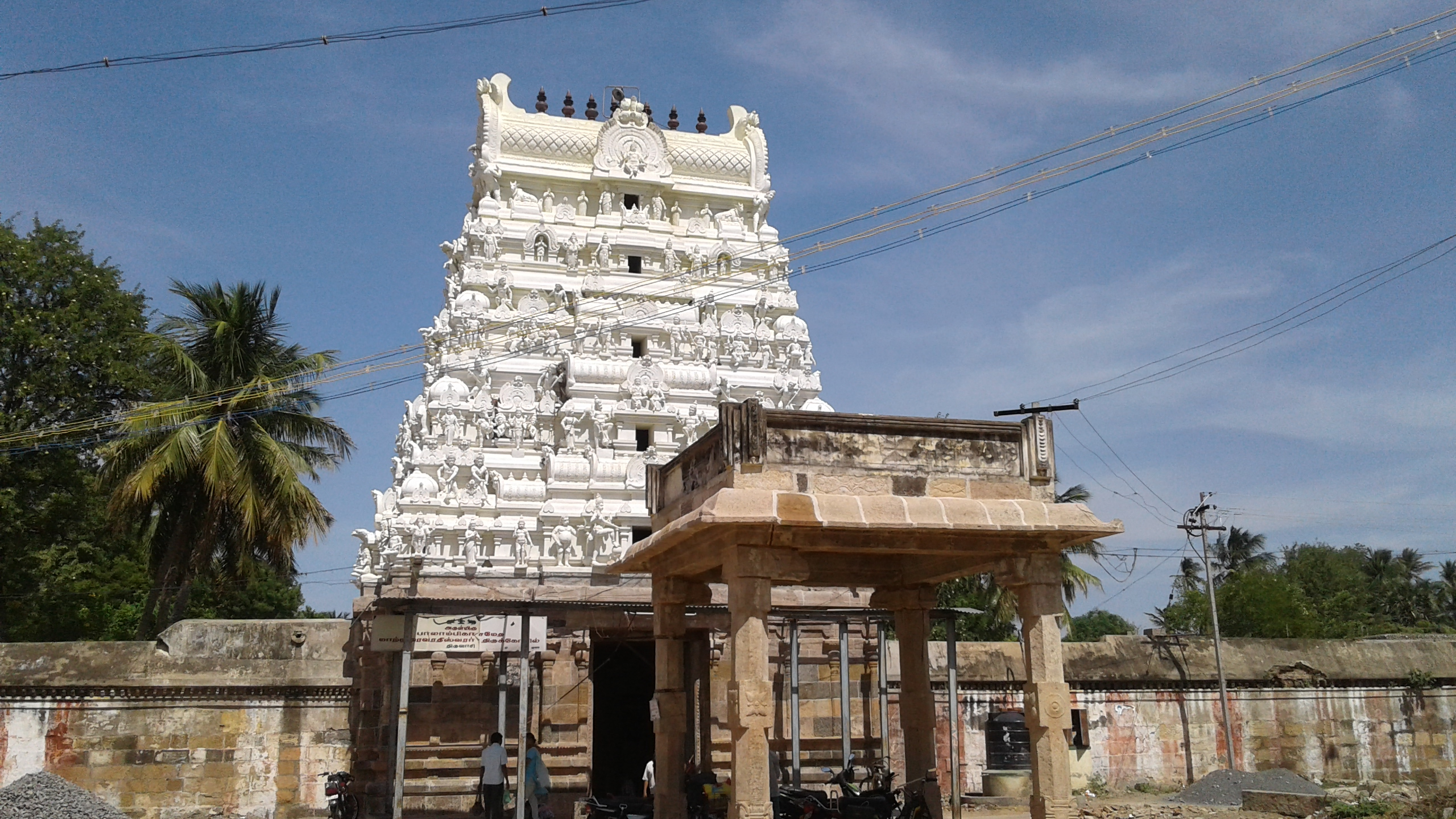

Tiruvasi Mattruraivaradeswarar Temple is a Tamil temple located at Tiruvasi in Trichy district of Tamil Nadu, India. The historical name of the place is Tirupalasiramam. The presiding deity is Shiva. He is called as Mattruraivaradar. His consort is known as Balambikai.

== Significance ==
It is one of the shrines of the 275 Paadal Petra Sthalams - Shiva Sthalams glorified in the early medieval Tevaram poems by Tamil Saivite Nayanars Tirugnanasambandar and Sundarar.

== Literary mention ==
Tirugnanasambandar describes the feature of the deity as:

மாந்தர்தம்பானறு நெய்மகிழ்ந்தாடி வளர்சடை மேற்புனல்வைத்து

மோந்தைமுழாக்குழல் தாளமொர்வீணை முதிரவோர் வாய்மூரிபாடி
ஆந்தைவிழிச்சிறு பூதத்தர்பாச்சி லாச்சிரா மத்துறைகின்ற

சாந்தணிமார்பரோ தையலைவாடச் சதுர்செய்வதோ விவர்சார்வே.
