= Tirunedunkulam Nedungalanathar Temple =

Tamil temple in Tamil Nadu, India

Thirunedunkulam Nedungalanathar Temple is a Tamil temple located at Thirunedunkulam in the Trichy district of Tamil Nadu, India. The historical name of the place is Thirunedungalam. The presiding deity is Shiva, who is locally called Thirunedungalanathar. He is also known as Nithya Sundareswarar. His consort is known as Oppila Nayaki and Mangalanayaki.

== Significance ==
It is one of the shrines of the 275 Paadal Petra Sthalams, a group of Shiva Sthalams glorified in the early medieval Tevaram poems by Tamil Saivite Nayanar Tirugnanasambandar. The temple is counted as one of the temples built on the banks of River Kaveri.

== Literary mention ==
Thirugnanasambandar describes the features of the deity as:

பாங்கினல்லார் படிமஞ்செய்வார் பாரிடமும் பலிசேர்

தூங்கிநல்லார் பாடலோடு தொழுகழலே வணங்கித்
தாங்கிநில்லா அன்பினோடுந் தலைவநின்றா ணிழற்கீழ்

நீங்கிநிலிலா ரிடர்களையாய் நெடுங்களமே யவனே.

Thirugnanasambandar has sung 10 hymns on the deity, which are found in Tevaram.
