= Tiruchopuram Mangalapureeswarar Temple =

Hindu temple in Tamil Nadu, India

Tiruchopuram Mangalapureeswarar Temple (திருச்சோபுரம் மங்களபுரீசுவரர் கோயில்)is a Hindu temple located at Tiruchopuram in Cuddalore district, Tamil Nadu, India. The presiding deity is Shiva. He is called as Mangalapureeswarar. His consort is known as Thyagavalliammai.

== Significance ==
It is one of the shrines of the 275 Paadal Petra Sthalams – Shiva Sthalams glorified in the early medieval Tevaram poems by Tamil Saivite Nayanar Sambandar.
