= Thirumeignanam Gnanaparameswarar Temple =

Hindu temple in Tamil Nadu, India

Coordinates: 10.8745°N 79.4738°E

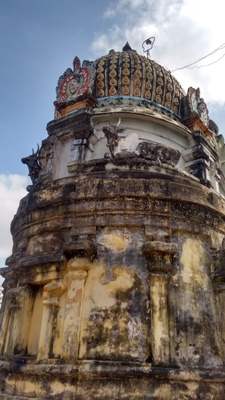
Vimana of the presiding deity

Thirumeignanam Gnanaparameswarar Temple (Tamil: திருமெய்ஞானம் ஞானபரமேஸ்வரர் கோயில்) is a Hindu temple located at Thirumeignanam in Thanjavur district, Tamil Nadu, India. The temple is dedicated to Shiva, as the moolavar presiding deity, in his manifestation as Gnanaparameswarar. His consort, Parvati, is known as Gnanambikai. The place is also known as Tirunallur Mayaanam.

== Significance ==
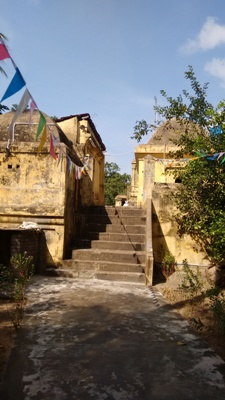
Main entrance

It is one of the shrines of the 275 Paadal Petra Sthalams - Shiva Sthalams glorified in the early medieval Tevaram poems by Tamil Saivite Nayanar Tirugnanasambandar.

== Literary mention ==
Tirugnanasambandar describes the feature of the deity as:

பத்துத் தலையோனைப் பாதத் தொருவிரலால்

வைத்து மலையடர்த்து வாளொடு நாள்கொடுத்தான்
நத்தி னொலியோவா நாலூர் மயானத்தென்

அத்த னடிநினைவார்க் கல்ல லடையாவே.
