= Sarguneswarar Temple =

Religion
- Affiliation: Hinduism
- District: Tiruvarur
- Deity: Lord Shiva

Location
- Location: Karuveli in the Tiruvarur district
- State: Tamil Nadu
- Country: India
- Interactive map of Sarguneswarar Temple
- Coordinates: 10°56′26″N 79°31′53″E

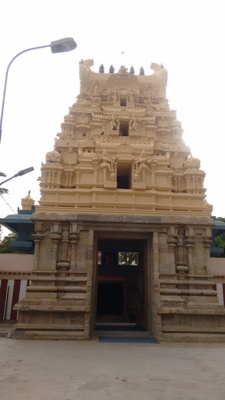
Rajagopura

Sarvaguneswarar Temple (சற்குணேஸ்வரர் கோயில்) is a Hindu temple in the village of Karuveli in the Tiruvarur district of Tamil Nadu, India. The temple is 500–1000 years old and dedicated to Shiva.

== Significance ==
It is one of the shrines of the 275 Paadal Petra Sthalams. Praises of the temple have been sung by the Saivite saint Thirunavukkarasar. According to Hindu belief, those who pray at the Sarvaguneswarar Temple will not be reborn and instead attain salvation.

== Shrines ==
The presiding deity is Sarvaguneswarar, a form of Shiva who is all complete and perfect with all the good qualities. There is a shrine for the consort Sarvanga-Nayaki. The idol of Sarvanga Nayaki is 5.5 feet tall. There are also shrines for Ganesha, Murugan, Ardhanarisvara, Brahma, Durga, Bhairava, Chandikeshvara and Dakshinamurtty.

== Gallery ==
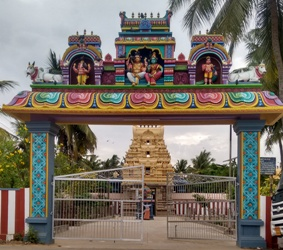
Entrance

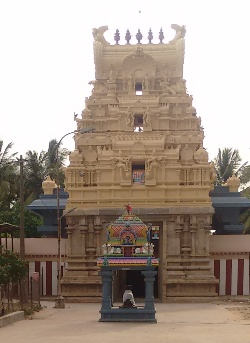
Nandi mandapa in front of rajagopura

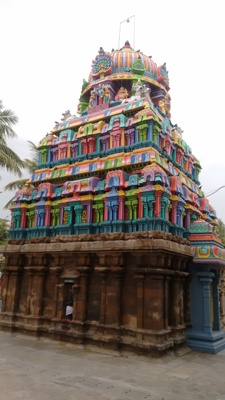
Vimana of the presiding deity

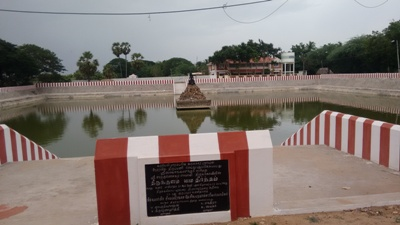
Temple tank
