= Andarkoil Swarnapureewarar Temple =

Coordinates: 10.930218°N 79.429894°E

- Location in Tamil Nadu

Religion
- Affiliation: Hinduism
- District: Tiruvarur
- Deity: LordShiva

Location
- Location: Andankoil, Valangaiman taluk
- State: Tamil Nadu
- Country: India

Architecture
- Type: Dravidian architecture

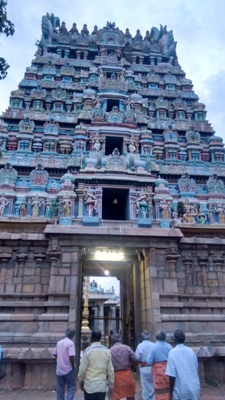
The entrance of the temple

Andarkoil Swarnapureewarar Temple (ஆண்டார்கோயில் சொர்ணபுரீசுவரர் கோயில்) is a Hindu temple located in the village of Andankoil in Valangaiman taluk of Tiruvarur district in Tamil Nadu, India.

== Legend ==
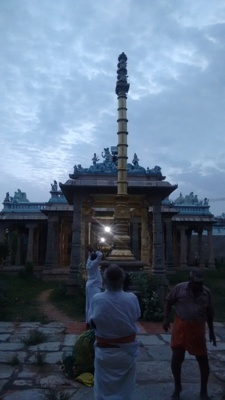
Flagpost

According to Hindu legend, when Kandadevar, a minister of king Muchkunda was travelling through the place, he felt tired and slept. However, since he did not wish to have dinner without having a darshan of Shiva, he had to go hungry. Shiva appeared in his dream and pointed out he would appear to his devotee at a nearby location. Kandadevar found a shivalinga at the prescribed spot and built a temple there with stone and mortar collected from passers-by. When Muchkunda learned of this, he charged Kandadevar with extorting his subjects and beheaded him. However, later Muchkunda realised his folly and tried to kill himself. At that instant, Shiva appeared before him and restored the minister to life.

== Significance ==
It is one of the shrines of the 275 Paadal Petra Sthalams. The Saivite saint Thirunavukkarasar sang praises of the temple in his Thevaram.
