= Mahendrapalli Tirumeni Azhagar Temple =

Coordinates: 11.3636°N 79.7933°E

Mahendrapalli Tirumeni Azhagar Temple (மகேந்திரப்பள்ளி திருமேனியழகர் கோயில்) is a Hindu temple located at Mahendirapalli in Mayiladuthurai district of Tamil Nadu, India. The presiding deity is Shiva. He is called as Tirumeni Azhagar. His consort is known as Vadivambigai.

== Significance ==
It is one of the shrines of the 275 Paadal Petra Sthalams - Shiva Sthalams glorified in the early medieval Tevaram poems by Tamil Saivite Nayanar Tirugnanasambandar. It is believed that Mahendra worshipped Shiva here and hence the place came to be known as Mahendrapalli. The temple is counted as one of the temples built on the northern banks of River Kaveri. This temple is located on the southern banks of Kollidam River.

== Literary Mention ==
Tirugnanasambandar describes the feature of the deity as:

கோங்கிள வேங்கையும் கொழுமலர்ப் புன்னையும்

தாங்குதேன் கொன்றையும் தகுமலர்க் குரவமும்
மாங்கரும் பும்வயன் மயேந்திரப் பள்ளியுள்

ஆங்கிருந் தவன்கழ லடியிணை பணிமினே.
