= Vaatpokki Ratnagirswarar Temple =

Vaatpokki Ratnagiriswarar Temple
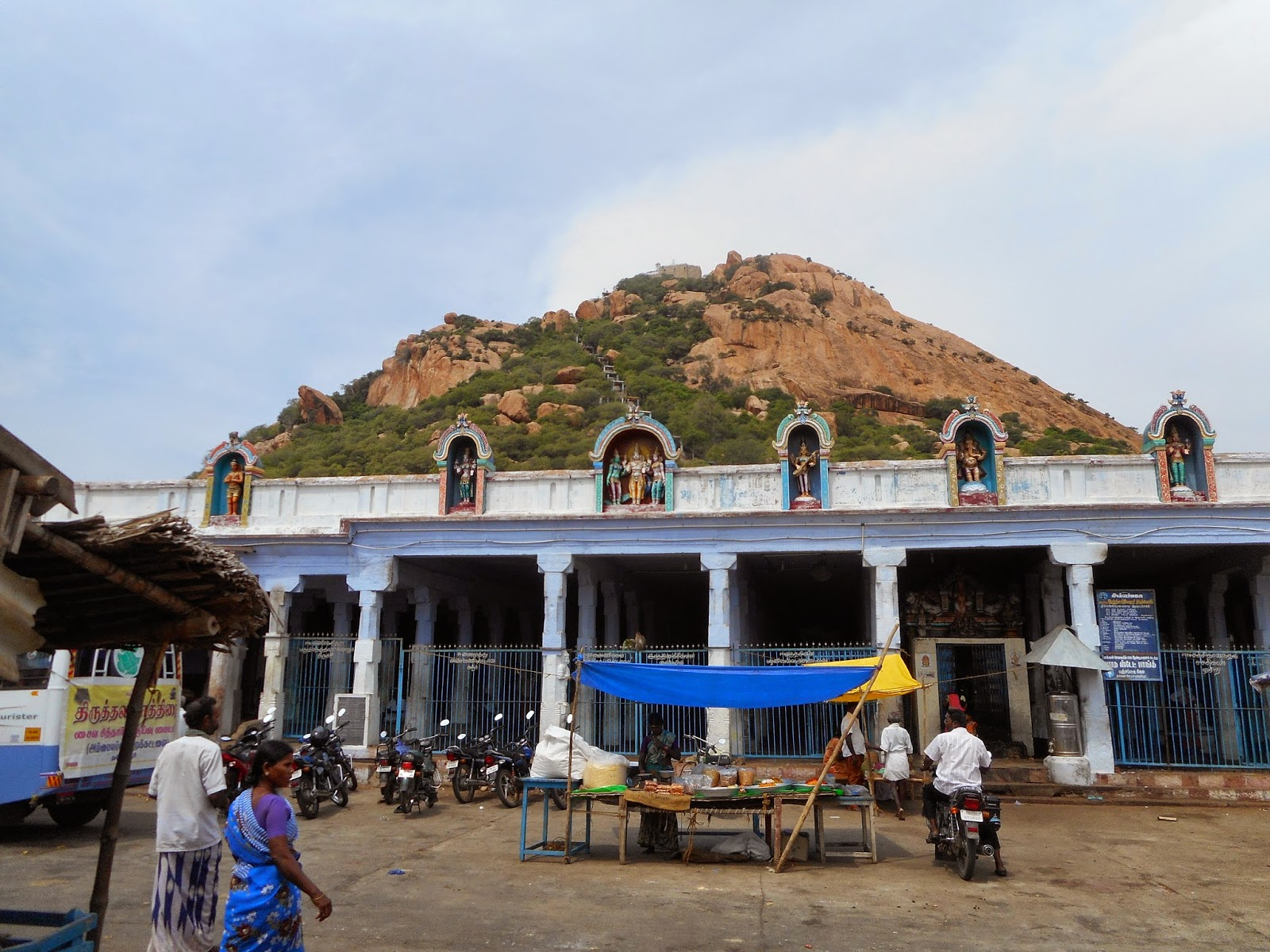
- Temple main entrance

Religion
- Affiliation: Hinduism

Location
- Interactive map of Vaatpokki Ratnagiriswarar Temple
- Coordinates: 10°52′42″N 78°22′57″E

Vaatpokki Ratnagiriswarar temple is a Hindu temple located at Karur district of Tamil Nadu, India. The presiding deity is Shiva. He is called as Ratnagiriswarar. His consort is Surumbar Kuzhali.

== Significance ==
It is one of the shrines of the 275 Paadal Petra Sthalams. Thirunavukkarasar have sung hymns in praise of the temple by Sundarar and Appar.
