= Tripuranthaka Swamy Temple =

Coordinates: 13.02°N 79.82°E

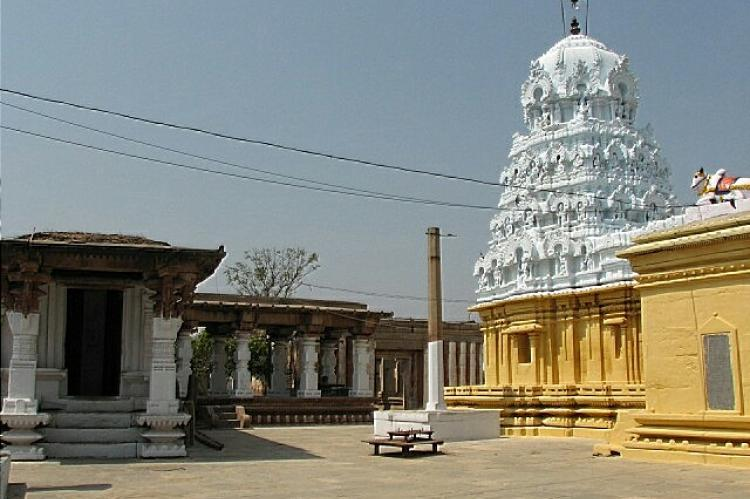
Tripuranthaka Swamy Temple

Tripuranthaka Swamy Temple is a Hindu temple located in the Tiruvallur district of Tamil Nadu, India. The presiding deity is Shiva.

== Speciality ==
It is one of the shrines of the 275 Paadal Petra Sthalams.
