= Palunkanda Nathar Temple =

Shiva temple in Tamil Nadu, India

Coordinates: 11.08283°N 79.43750°E

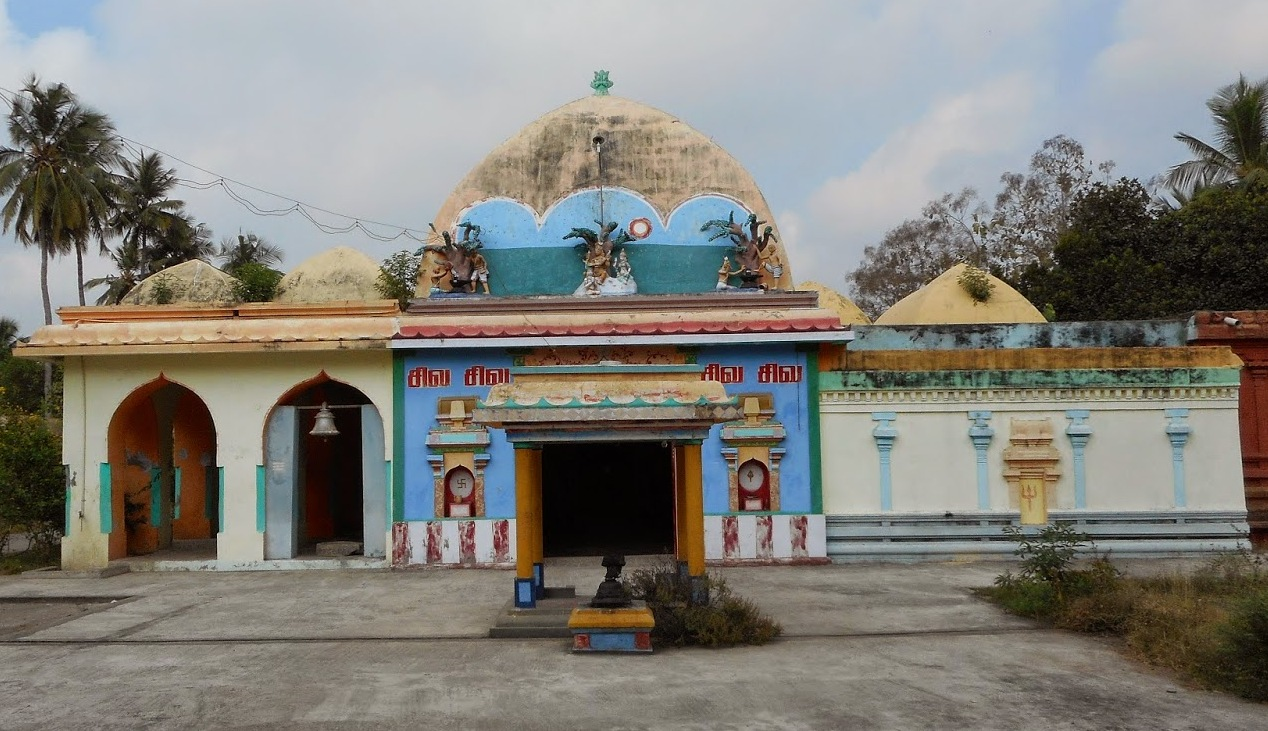
The entrance of the temple

Palunkanda Nathar Temple is a Hindu temple in the village of Thiruvaipadi near Thiruppanandal in the Thanjavur district of Tamil Nadu, India.

== Deity ==
The presiding deity is Shiva. The temple is associated with the life of Chandeshvara Nayanar, one of the 63 Nayanmars or Saivite saints.

== Significance ==
According to legend, Chandesvara Nayanar was employed as a cowherd at Thiruvaipadi where he constructed a shivalinga and did pooja to the linga by offering the milk obtained from the cows.

Hymns in praise of the temple were composed by the Saivite saint Thirunavukkarasar in the Thevaram.

== Literary mention ==
Tirunavukkarasar describes the feature of the deity as:

அண்டமா ரமரர் கோமா னாதியெம் மண்ணல் பாதம்

கொண்டவன் குறிப்பி னாலே கூப்பினான் றாப ரத்தைக்
கண்டவன் றாதை பாய்வான் காலற வெறியக் கண்டு

தண்டியார்க் கருள்கள் செய்த தலைவராப் பாடி யாரே.
