= Nardana Pureeswarar Temple =

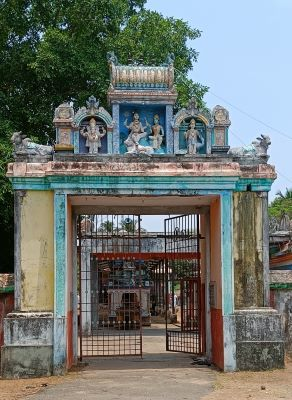

Religion
- Affiliation: Hinduism
- District: Tiruvarur
- Deity: Lord Shiva

Location
- Location: Thalayalangadu
- State: Tamil Nadu
- Country: India
- Interactive map of Nardana Pureeswarar Temple

Architecture
- Type: Dravidian architecture

Nardana Pureeswarar Temple (நர்த்தனபுரீஸ்வரர் கோயில்) is a Hindu temple located at Thalayalangadu in the Tiruvarur district of Tamil Nadu, India. The temple is dedicated to Shiva.

== History ==
The Pandya king Nedunchezhiyan is believed to have defeated the Chera and Chola kings at this place.

== Significance ==
Prayer to the deity at the Nardana Pureeswarar Temple is believed to cure leprosy patients. Praises of the temple have been sung by Thirunavukkarasar.

== Shrines ==
There are shrines to Vinayaka, Viswanatha, Murugan and Bhairava within the temple complex.
