= Gnanapureeswarar Temple, Tiruvadishoolam =

Coordinates: 12.698472°N 80.030416°E

Gnanapureeswarar Temple, Tiruvadishoolam (ஞானபுரீஸ்வரர் கோயில், திருவடிசூலம்) is a Hindu temple located at Tiruvadishoolam near Chengalpattu in the Chengalpattu district of Tamil Nadu, India.
