= Margabandeesvarar Temple, Sirupuliyur =

Shiva temple in Tamil Nadu, India

Margabandeesvarar Temple is a Hindu temple dedicated to the deity Shiva, located at Sirupuliyur in the Nannilam taluk of Thiruvarur district, Tamil Nadu, India.

== Presiding deity ==
The presiding deity in the garbhagriha, represented by the lingam, is known as Margabandeesvarar and Vazhitthunainathar.

== Nava Puliyur Temples ==
Patanjali and Vyaghrapada, also known as tiger legged Rishi wanted to see the celestial dance of Shiva. Shiva asked them to come on the day of Thaippusam. As per the advice of the Lord, Vyaghrapada and Patanjali came on that particular day and prayed to Shiva, for getting Moksha.Shiva, in turn, asked them to worship the nine Puliyurs known as 'Nava Puliyur' and complete the journey at Srirangam. The spiritual journey made the devotees to feel that Ranganatha of Srirangam and Nataraja of Chidambaram are two forms of the God. They worshipped the following nine Shiva temples.

- Perumpatrapuliyur
- Thirupathiripuliyur
- Erukathampuliyur
- Omampuliyur
- Sirupuliyur
- Atthippuliyur
- Thaplampuliyur
- Perumpuliyur
- Kanattampuliyur

== Navapuliyur Journey ==
Patanjali and Vyaghrapada went to these nine temples found in the above places. When they were about to reach Sirupuliyur it became night. As there was no light they could not able to continue their journey. So they started worshipping Ranga from their place itself, and started uttering moksha mantra. At that time Nataraja of Chidambaram came to their rescue and accompany them. He also informed them that still the temple is at a distance. At the same time Ranganatha, as an young Ranganatha appeared. As Ranganatha gave darshan to Patanjali and Vyaghrapada, this temple is talked along with the Sthalasayana Perumal Temple, one of the 108 Divyadesam dedicated to Vishnu.

== Location ==
The temple is located at a place known as Nadakudi, near Sirupuliyur, at a distance of 20 km from Mayiladuthurai. This place can be reached through Mayiladuthurai-Kollumangudi. From Erukkatthampuliyur it is situated at a distance of 85 km in the Chidambaram-Mayiladuthurai-Kollumangudi route.
