= Kanattampuliyur Pathanchalinathar Temple =

Hindu temple in Tamil Nadu, India

Kanattampuliyur Pathanchalinathar Temple (கானாட்டம்புலியூர் பதஞ்சலிநாதர் கோயில்) is a Hindu temple located at Kanattampuliyur in Cuddalore district of Tamil Nadu, India. The historical name of the place is Tirukanattumullur. The presiding deity is Shiva. He is called as Patanjaleeswarar. His consort is known as Kola Valai Kai Ambicai.

== Significance ==
It is one of the shrines of the 275 Paadal Petra Sthalams - Shiva Sthalams glorified in the early medieval Tevaram poems by Tamil Saivite Nayanar Sundarar. It is believed to be the place where sage Patanjali lived. The temple is counted as one of the temples built on the northern banks of River Kaveri.

== Nava Puliyur Temples ==
This is one of the Nava Puliyur Temples worshipped by Patanjali and Vyaghrapada. The following temples are called as Nava Puliyur Temples.

- Perumpatrapuliyur
- Thirupathiripuliyur
- Erukathampuliyur
- Omampuliyur
- Sirupuliyur
- Atthippuliyur
- Thaplampuliyur
- Perumpuliyur
- Kanattampuliyur

== Literary mention ==
Sundarar describes the feature of the deity as:

அருமணியை முத்தினை ஆன்அஞ்சும் ஆடும் அமரர்கள்தம் பெருமானை அருமறையின் பொருளைத்

திருமணியைத் தீங்கரும்பின் ஊறலிருந் தேனைத் தெரிவரிய மாமணியைத் திகழ்தரு செம்பொன்னைக்
குருமணிகள் கொழித்திழிந்து சுழிந்திழியுந் திரைவாய்க் கோல்வளையார் குடைந்தாடும் கொள்ளிடத்தின் கரைமேல்

கருமணிகள் போல்நீலம் மலர்கின்ற கழனிக் கானாட்டு முள்ளூரிற் கண்டு தொழுதேனே.
