= Vyagrapurisvarar Temple, Thaplampuliyur =

Temple in Tamil Nadu, India

Vyagrapurisvarar Temple, Thapplampuliyur

Religion
- Affiliation: Hinduism
- District: Tiruvarur
- Deity: Lord Shiva

Location
- Location: Thapplampuliyur
- State: Tamil Nadu
- Country: India

Architecture
- Type: Dravidian architecture

Vyagrapurisvarar Temple is a Hindu temple dedicated to the deity Shiva, located at Thappalampuliyur in the Tiruvarur district, Tamil Nadu, India.

== Presiding deity ==
The presiding deity in the garbhagriha, represented by the lingam, is known as Vyagrapurisvarar and the goddess is known as Nityakalyani.

== Nava Puliyur Temples ==
This is one of the Nava Puliyur Temples worshipped by Patanjali and Vyaghrapada. The following temples are called as Nava Puliyur Temples.

- Perumpatrapuliyur
- Thirupathiripuliyur
- Erukathampuliyur
- Omampuliyur
- Sirupuliyur
- Atthippuliyur
- Thaplampuliyur
- Perumpuliyur
- Kanattampuliyur

== Speciality ==
This place was known as 'Tharparavanam' in Satya Yuga, 'Mathuvanam' in Treta Yuga, 'Thevavanam' in Dvapara Yuga and 'Vyagrapuram' in Kali Yuga. As Tharpara Maharishi did penance in this place, this place was known as Tharparanpuliyur. As a frog known as 'Thappanai' worshipped here this was also known as Thaplampuliyur. Once a Brahmin who lived in Kasi took an oil bath on the day of 'Dvadasi' and got the curse to become a tiger and he became so. He worshipped the deity of this place and got his curse cured. As a tiger got its curse cured this deity of temple is Vyagrapurisvarar.Vyaghrapada, also known as tiger legged Rishi and Patanjali worshipped this place, the temple got its name. As the goddess bestows the wedding boon she is known as Nityakalyani.She is compared with the deity of Ujjain and other goddess of many temples in Tamil Nadu. She is worshipped as family deity by many devotees. Generally in the kosta of the Shiva temples Vinayaka, Dakshinamurthy, Lingodbhava, Vishnu, Brahma and Durga would be found. But in this temple, as Patanjali, Vyaghrapada and Manduga rishi worshipped here, Nataraja is found in the kosta. In the place of Lingodbhava, Ardhanarishvara is found.

== Structure ==
Many Chola kings contributed for the construction of the temple. Of the 64 forms of Shiva, Ekabathamurti is found in a separate shrine. Shrines of Juradeva, Nataraja, Saptakannia, Surya, Vaishnavi, Durga, and Kala Bhairava are found in this temple. Kumbhabhishekham took place on 27 April 2014. Juradeva also known as Juraharavesvar is with four legs. Temple tank Vyagra Tirtta is found in the temple. Temple trees are Kattathi and Vanni. Jestadevi which her two children Manthan and Manthi are found in this temple. Very near to Ardhanarishvara, the shrine of Mahalakshmi is found. Sanisvara is found in a separate shrine facing east.

== Location ==
This temple is located at the road leading to Nagalur and Thevur, from Tiruvarur. It is situated at a distance of 5 km. from 5 km. in southeast.
