= Atthippuliyur Chidambaresvarar Temple =

Shiva temple in Tamil Nadu, India

Athipuliyur Chidambaresvarar Temple is a Hindu temple dedicated to the deity Shiva, located at Athipuliyur in the Nagapattinam district, Tamil Nadu, India.

== Presiding deity ==
The presiding deity in the garbhagriha, represented by the lingam, is known as Chidambaresvarar. As the deity appeared before Agastya as Ammayappa, he is seen in the posture of Kalyanasundara in the temple.

== Nava Puliyur temples ==
This is one of the Nava Puliyur Temples worshipped by Patanjali and Vyaghrapada. The following temples are called as Nava Puliyur Temples.

- Perumpatrapuliyur
- Thirupathiripuliyur
- Erukathampuliyur
- Omampuliyur
- Sirupuliyur
- Atthippuliyur
- Thaplampuliyur
- Perumpuliyur
- Kanattampuliyur

== Speciality ==
In Satya Yuga, the two sons of Romasanma Rishi, Ketharar and Peralar, came to south India on pilgrimage. On their way near Patalivanam, Peralar halted there itself. Ketharar started to do penance along with the risis who were doing penance in Kuruvinthavan. On a particular day he found a lingam found under the Kuruvintha tree. As he first saw the lingam, the deity was known as Kethareesvarar and the place as Ketharam. That place was also called as Ketharam. In Kali Yuga, a Pandya king known as Kesarithuvajan, on the curse of Mandaliya rishi became an elephant and started roaming all the places nearby. In order to get the curse cured he started worshipping all the temples. At that time, he came to Kuruvinthavanam. On seeing the deity at that place he started to worship the deity in order to get rid of the curse. His prayers were answered by Shiva in that place. Later Vyaghrapada, also known as tiger legged Rishi also worshipped the deity. So this place was known as Atthippuliyur. 'Atthi' refers to the elephant while the 'puli' refers to the tiger. This place is also known as Dakshina Ketharam, the south Ketharam.

== Structure ==
The shrine of the presiding deity is facing south. In the garbhagriha, on the rear side of lingam, Kalyanasundara is found. The king Serithuvan as and elephant and Vyaghrapada worshipped the presiding deity of the temple, this place is known as Atthippuliyur. The temple is found in an area of 4.2 acres.

== Location ==
From Kilvelur it is found at a distance of 5 km. The temple is located at Nagapattinam-Tiruvarur at a distance of 17 km from Nagapattinam, in west. On the north bank of Kadukai river this temple is found. During Margazhi Tiruvathirai and Thai, festivals are held in this temple. The temple is opened for worship from 6.00 a.m. to 12.00 noon and 4.30 p.m. to 8.30 p.m. Daily pujas are held twice.
