= Nandhi Marriage Festival =

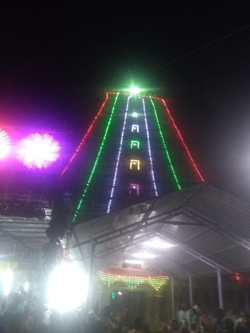
Temple on the festival day of Nandhi Marriage

Nandhi Marriage Festival is a celestial marriage festival held in Thirumazhapadi, Ariyalur district, Tamil Nadu, India. At that time Lord Nandi (Hinduism) the bridegroom from Tiruvaiyaru marries Goddess Swayambikai in Thirumazhapadi Vaidyanathaswami Temple.

== Birth of Nandhi ==
According to sivapurana Nandi (Hinduism) A traditional story is connected with this marriage. According to it Silatha Munivar also known as Silathar lived at a place known as Anthanapuram, presently Anthanarkurichi, near Tiruvaiyaru. As he had no children he prayed the presiding deity of Aiyarappar Temple. The Lord appeared before him and said,‘Silatha! Do a yaga for getting child. During that time you will get a box. In it a child would be found. You take him. Upto his 16th age he will live with you’. He followed the advice and by that way got a child. He named him as Sappesan. Before attaining 14th age he learnt all types of arts.

== Tapas ==
Father came to know that his child would live only two years more. At the same time, the son came to know that he would live upto 16 years of his age. After knowing this he reached the tank of the temple of Ayyarappar Temple and make Tapas, standing on one of his leg only, by worshipping Shiva. The Lord appeared before him and bestowed him with blessings. Later he, because of his love on Shiva, came to know many Upadeśa and had the privilege of being the head to the Ganas and the right of guarding the entrance of the temple of Shiva. He is known as Nandhi. Shiva wishes to conduct the marriage of Nandhi at the right time. Having Vaidhyanathaswamy of Thirumazhapadi as witness, the Lord conducts the marriage of Nandhi and Suyasambikai, the daughter of Vyagrabatha Munivar and granddaughter of Vashistar during the Tamil month of Panguni (mid March-mid April), in Punarpoosam star.

== Festival in Andhanarkurichi ==
The birth of Nandhi is held in Andhanarkurichi in a grand manner. Special abishegams are done to him. Later pattabishegam is held. Special pujas are held. Later the processional deity would go around the place. The next day Ayyarappar, the presiding deity along with Goddess go in a palanquin. Nandhi would go on the mount of horse in the attire of a bridegroom to the accompaniment of music. Starting from Tiruvaiyaru, the palanquin would go through Thillaisthanam, Kaduveli, Vaidhyanathanpettai and after crossing Kollidam reach Thirumazhapadi during evening.

== Marriage Festival ==
In Thirumazhapadi, Vaidyanathasamy and His consort welcome the group of bridegroom to the accompaniment of music. Then they will be taken to the specially erected wedding mandapa. The marriage festival is held in front of the devotees. After completion of the festival deeparadhana would be done. Later the celestial couples offer blessings. The priests of the temple perform the marriage of Nandhi. As per the marriage ritual the couple would go around the ceremonial fire seven times. Shiva took the newly wed couple to seven Shiva temples around Thiruvaiyaru. These seven temples are known as Saptha Sthanams. They are very close to each other and can be covered in one session. In the tamil month of Chittirai (April-May), the Deity (Utsavar) of Thiruvaiyaru is carried on a palanquin to all these temples.

== Timely marriage ==
It is said that those who are not married in time, would see the marriage festival of Nandhi, would get married soon.

== 16 March 2019 Marriage festival ==
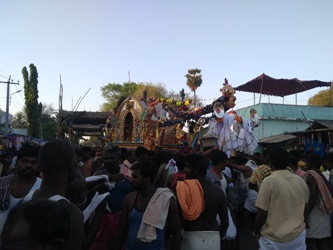

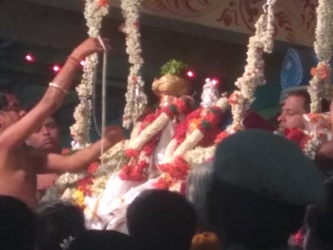

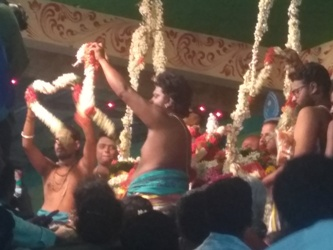

birth festival of Nandi
