= Sthalasayana Perumal Temple =

Sthalasayana Perumal Temple may refer to:

- Sthalasayana Perumal Temple, Tirusirupuliyur, a temple in Thirusirupuliyur, Nagapattinam district, Tamil Nadu, India
- Sthalasayana Perumal Temple, Mahabalipuram, a temple in Mahabalipuram, Kanchipuram district, Tamil Nadu, India
