= Thirumazhapadi Vaidyanathaswami Temple =

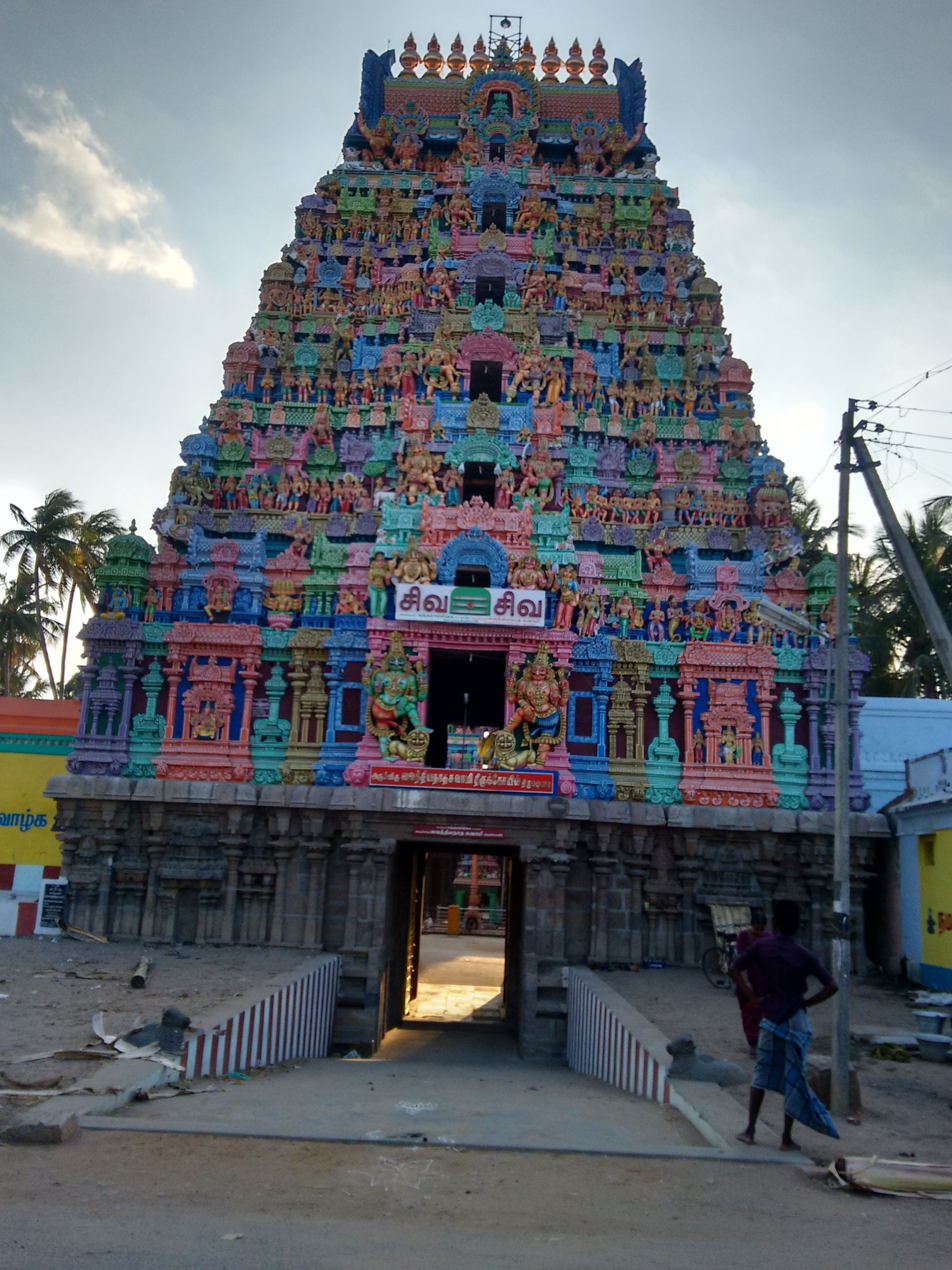

- Location in Tamil Nadu

Religion
- Affiliation: Hinduism
- District: Ariyalur
- Deity: Vaidyanathaswami (Shiva)

Location
- State: Tamil Nadu
- Country: India
- Coordinates: 10°53′58″N 79°03′30″E

Architecture
- Type: Dravidian architecture

Thirumazhapadi Vaidyanathaswami Temple is a Hindu temple located at Thirumazhapadi in Ariyalur district, Tamil Nadu, India. The temple is dedicated to Shiva, as the moolavar presiding deity, in his manifestation as Vaidyanathaswami. His consort, Parvati, is known as Sundarambikai. The historical name of the place is Mazhuvadi.

== Significance ==
It is one of the shrines of the 275 Paadal Petra Sthalams - Shiva Sthalams glorified in the early medieval Tevaram poems by Tamil Saivite Nayanars Tirugnanasambandar, Tirunavukkarasar and Sundarar.

It is one of the tourist places in Ariyalur. This temple is famous for its "Nandikesvarar thirukalyanam" (March/April) which is conducted yearly. The people of thirumalapadi celebrate the festival grandly. It also has a statue of Thiruvalluvar, which was made with 750 kg of Bronze. It is the biggest metallic statue of Thiruvalluvar in Tamil Nadu. The temple is counted as one of the temples built on the northern banks of River Kaveri.

== Nandi Kalyanam ==
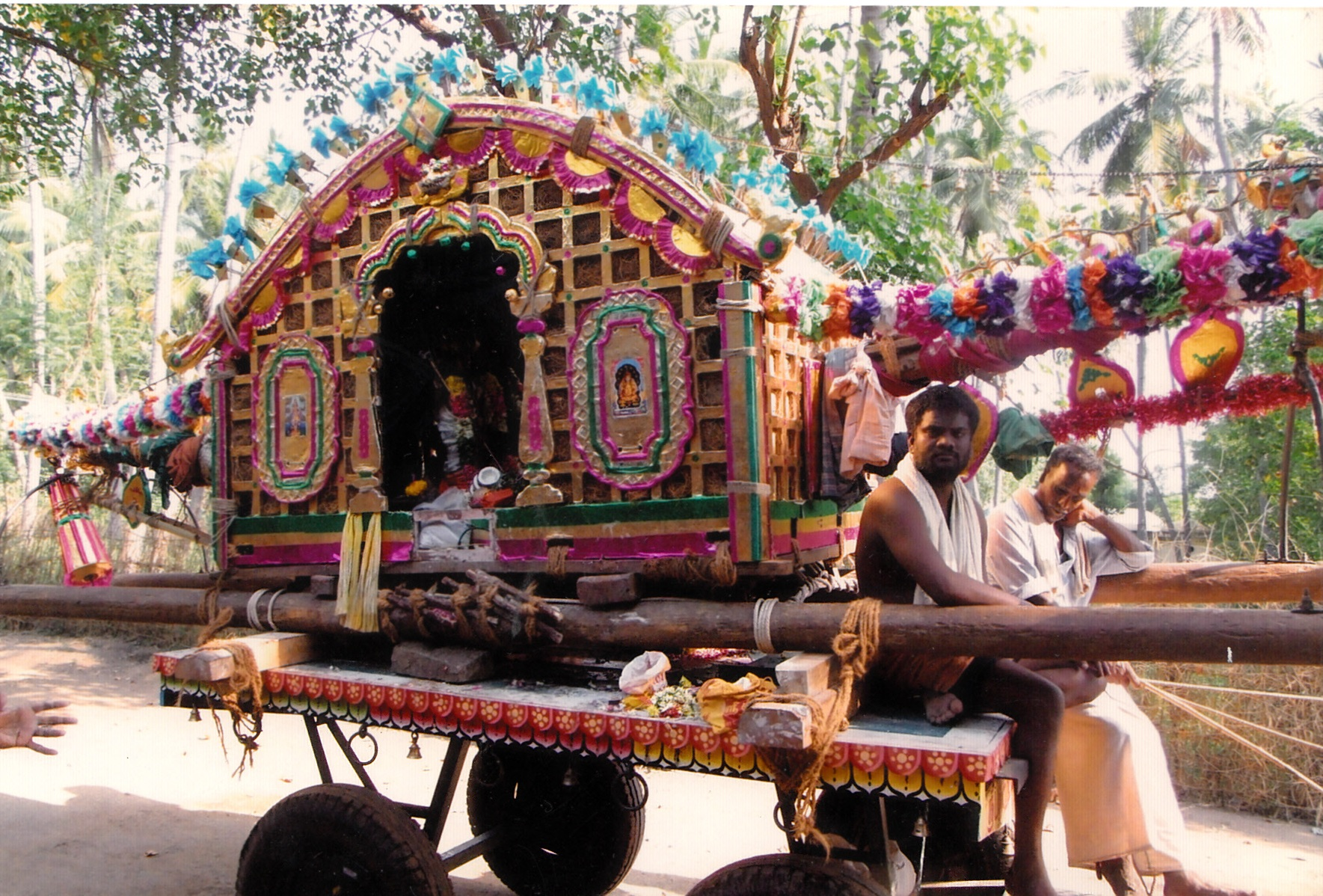
Image of Palanquin

Nandi kalyanam, the celestial wedding of the Nandi (bull), is celebrated in a grand manner in this temple during the Tamil month of Panguni (mid-March to mid-April). At that time Lord Nandeeswara, the bridegroom of Aiyarappar temple marries Goddess Swayambikai of Thirumazhapadi and is brought in a palanquin. He is accorded a reception by the presiding deity of the temple Vaidyanathasami.

== Photo gallery ==
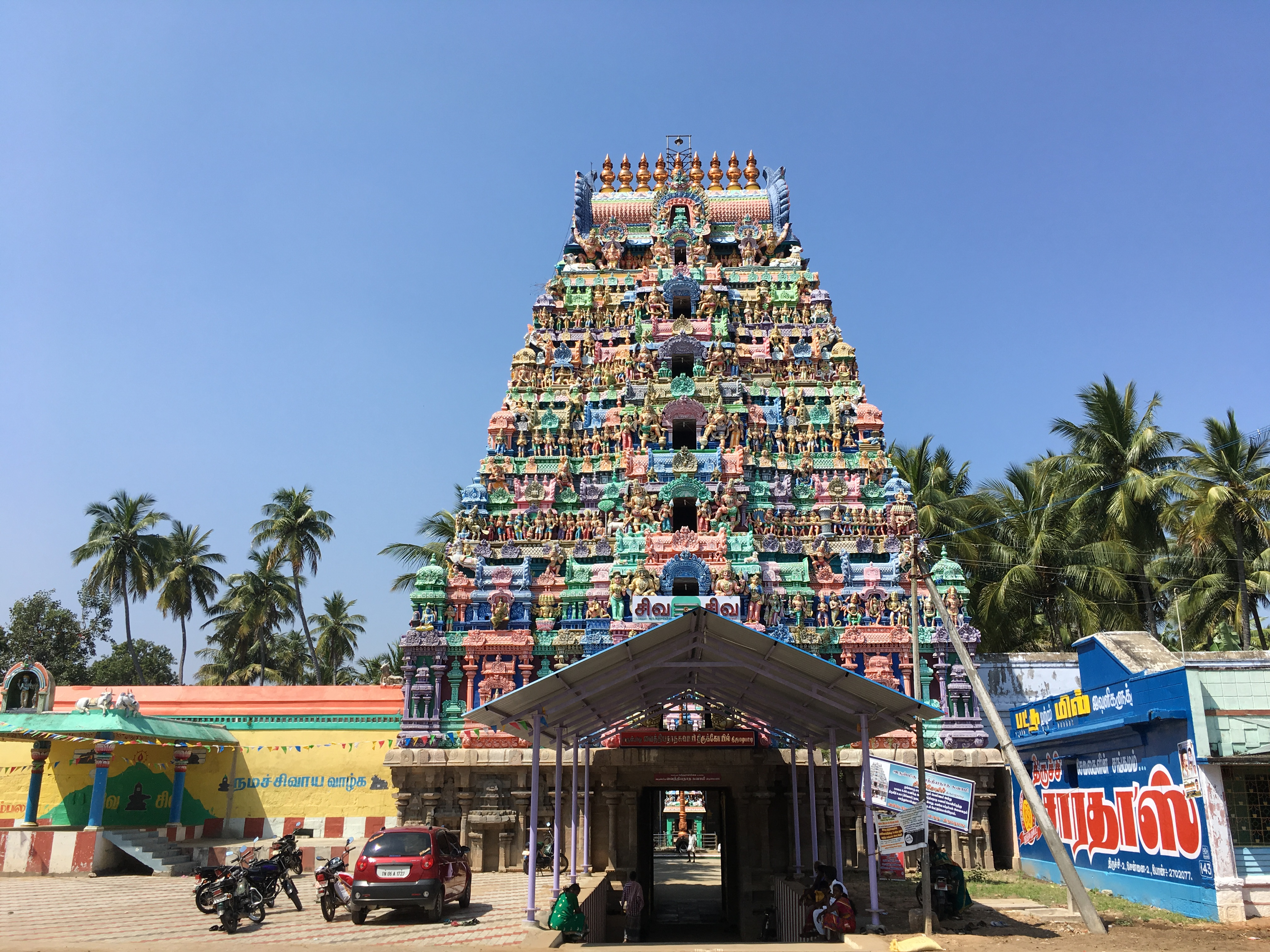
Thirumazhapadi Temple

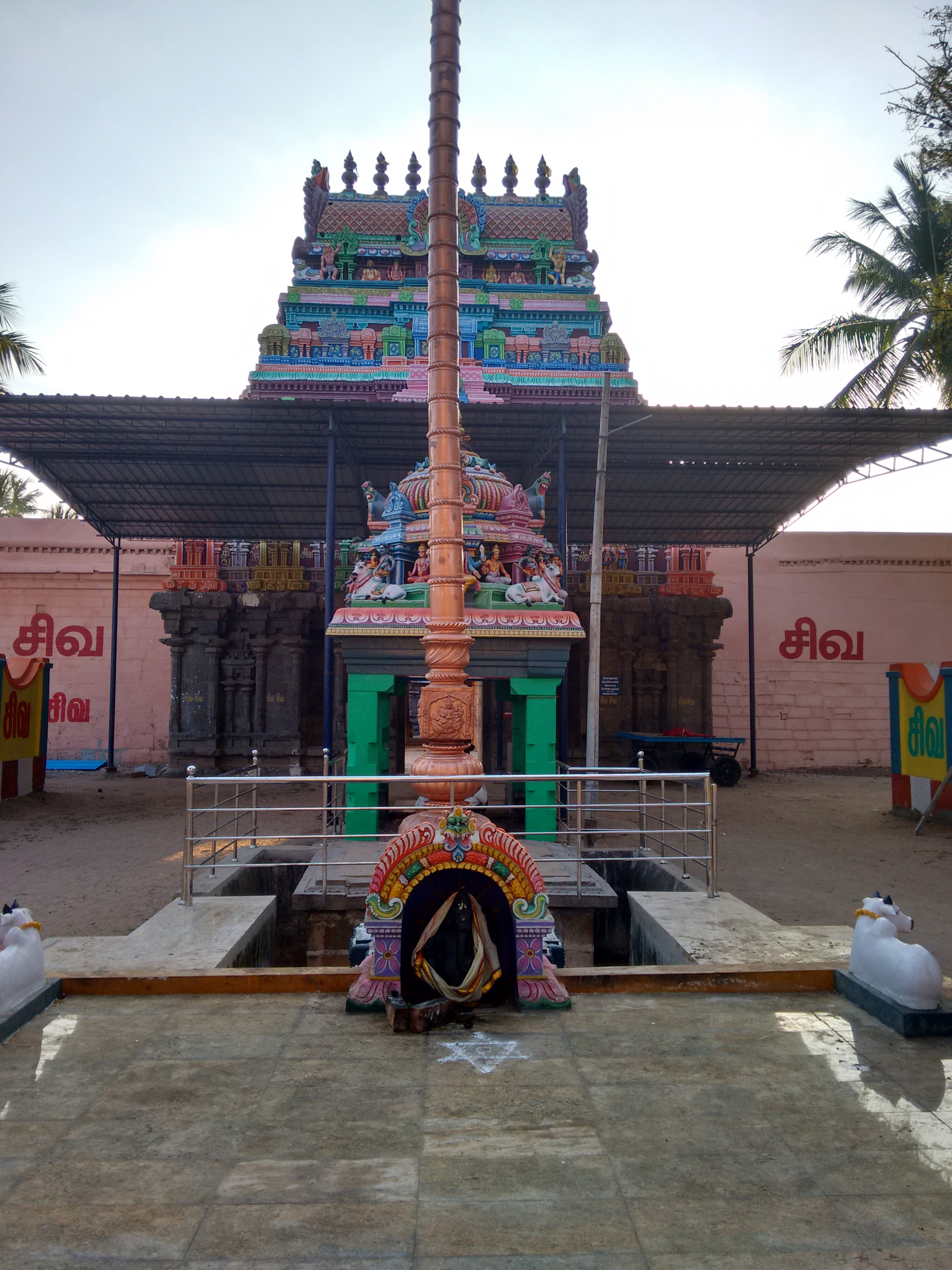
Next entrance

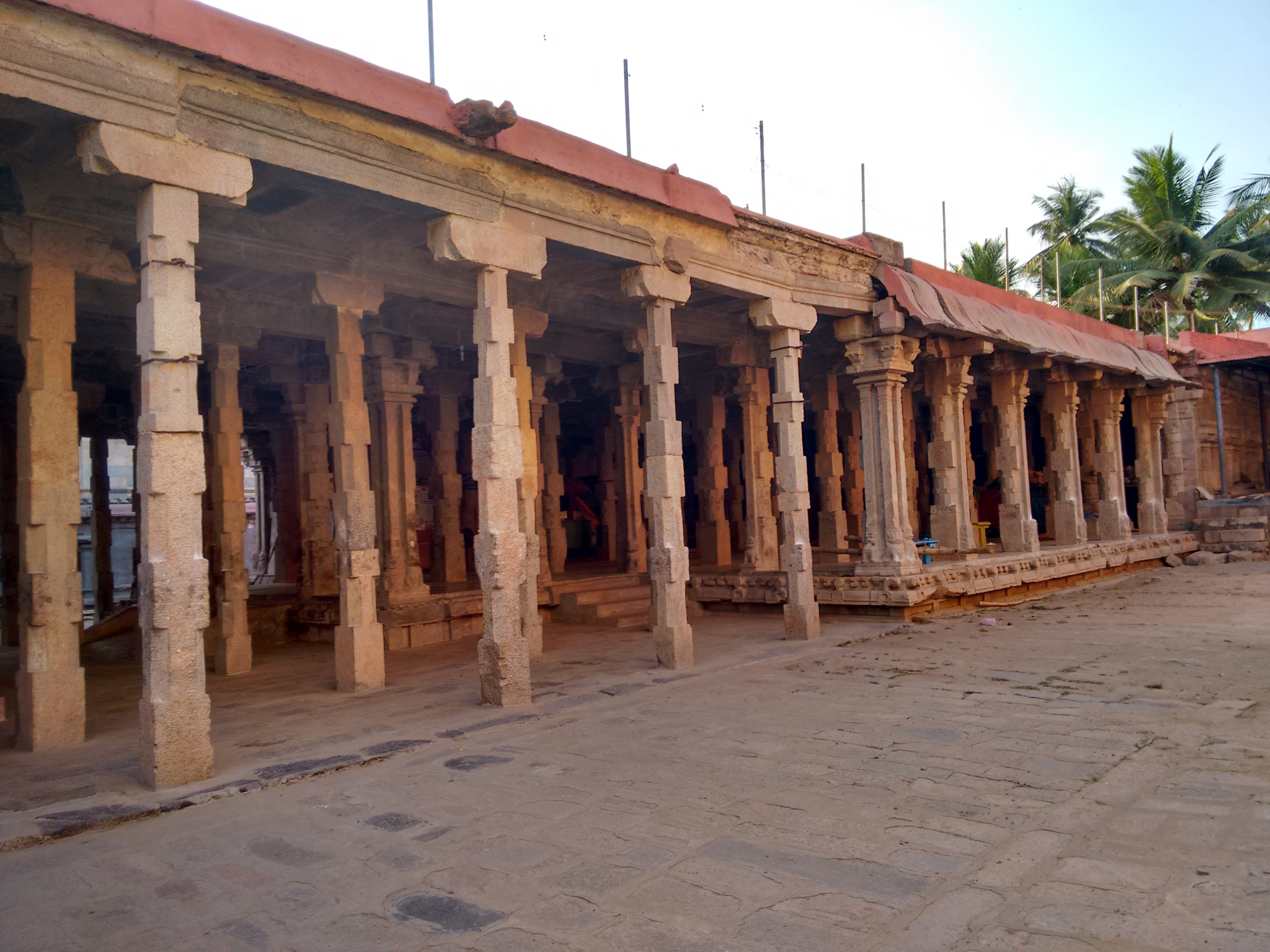
Pillar mandapa

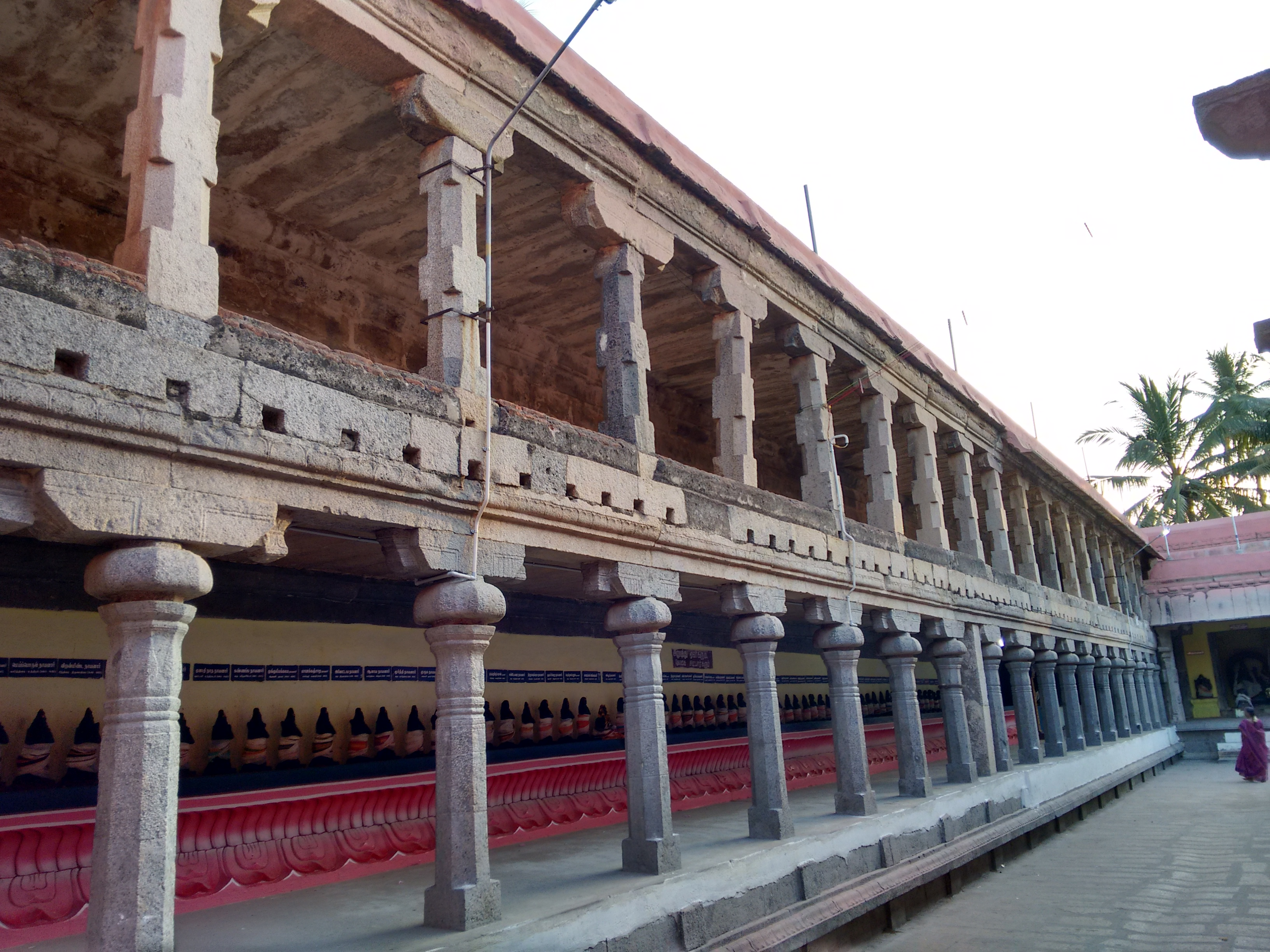
Prakara right side

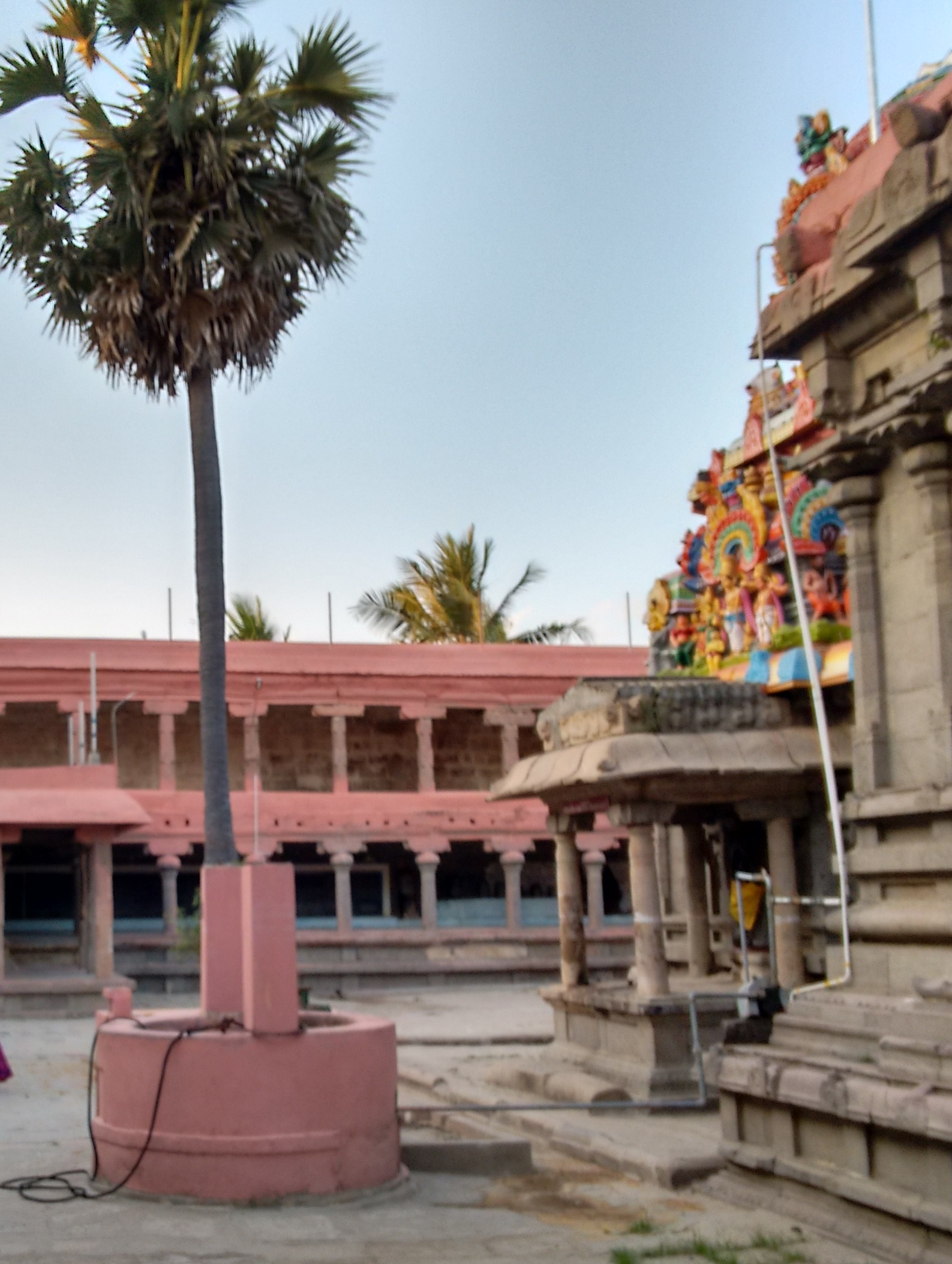
Temple tree in inner prakara

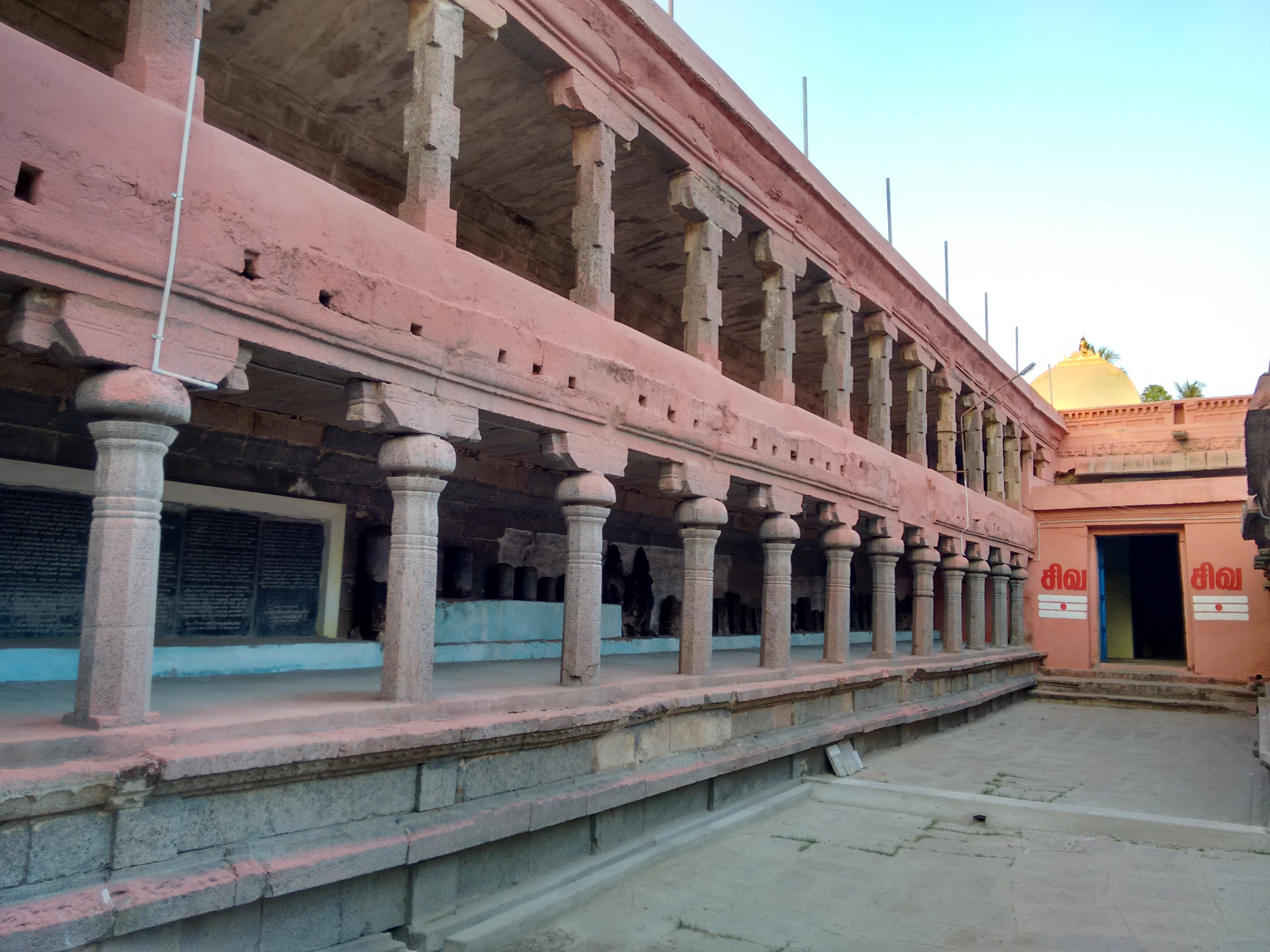
Inner prakara

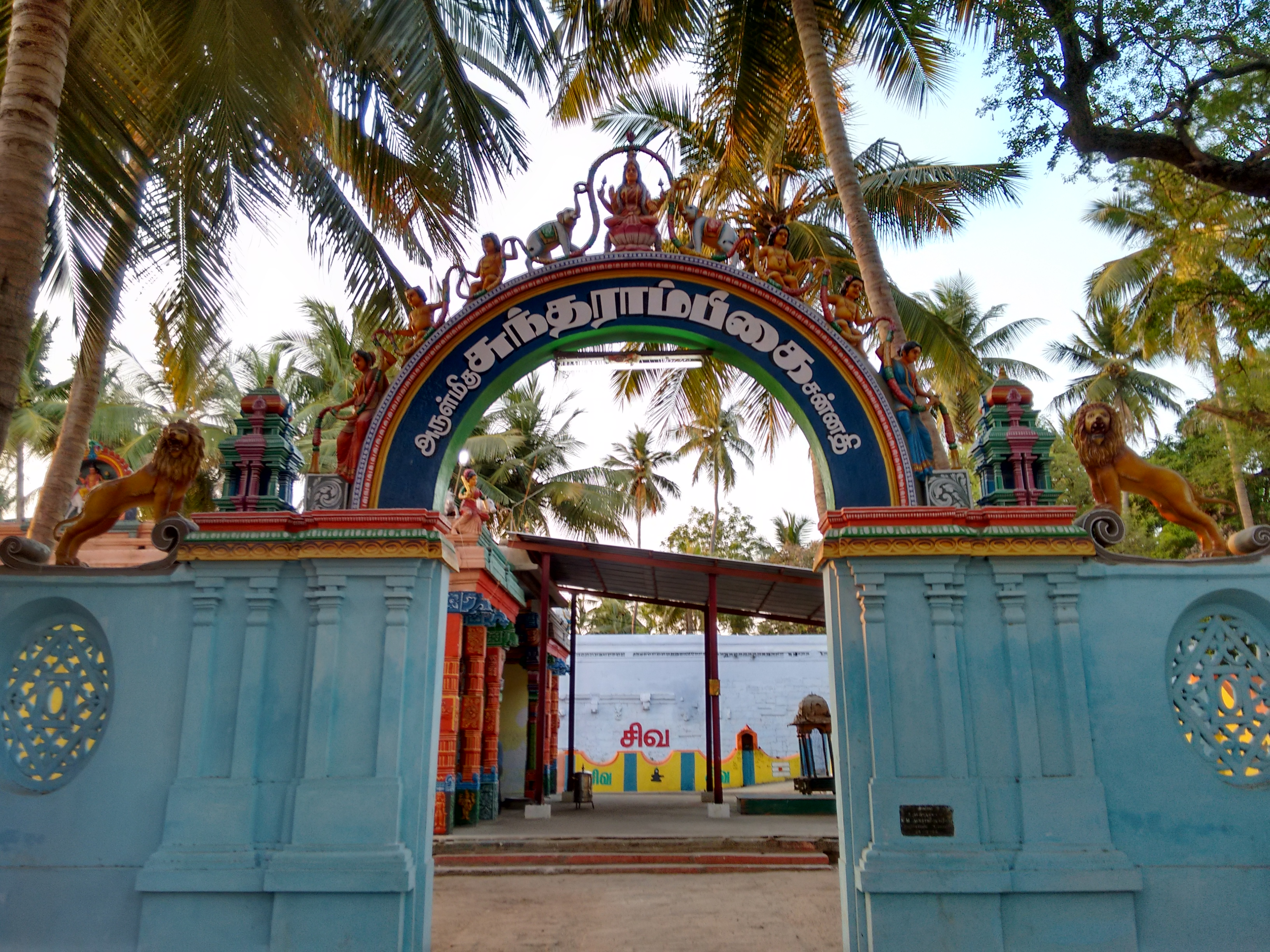
Amman shrine entrance

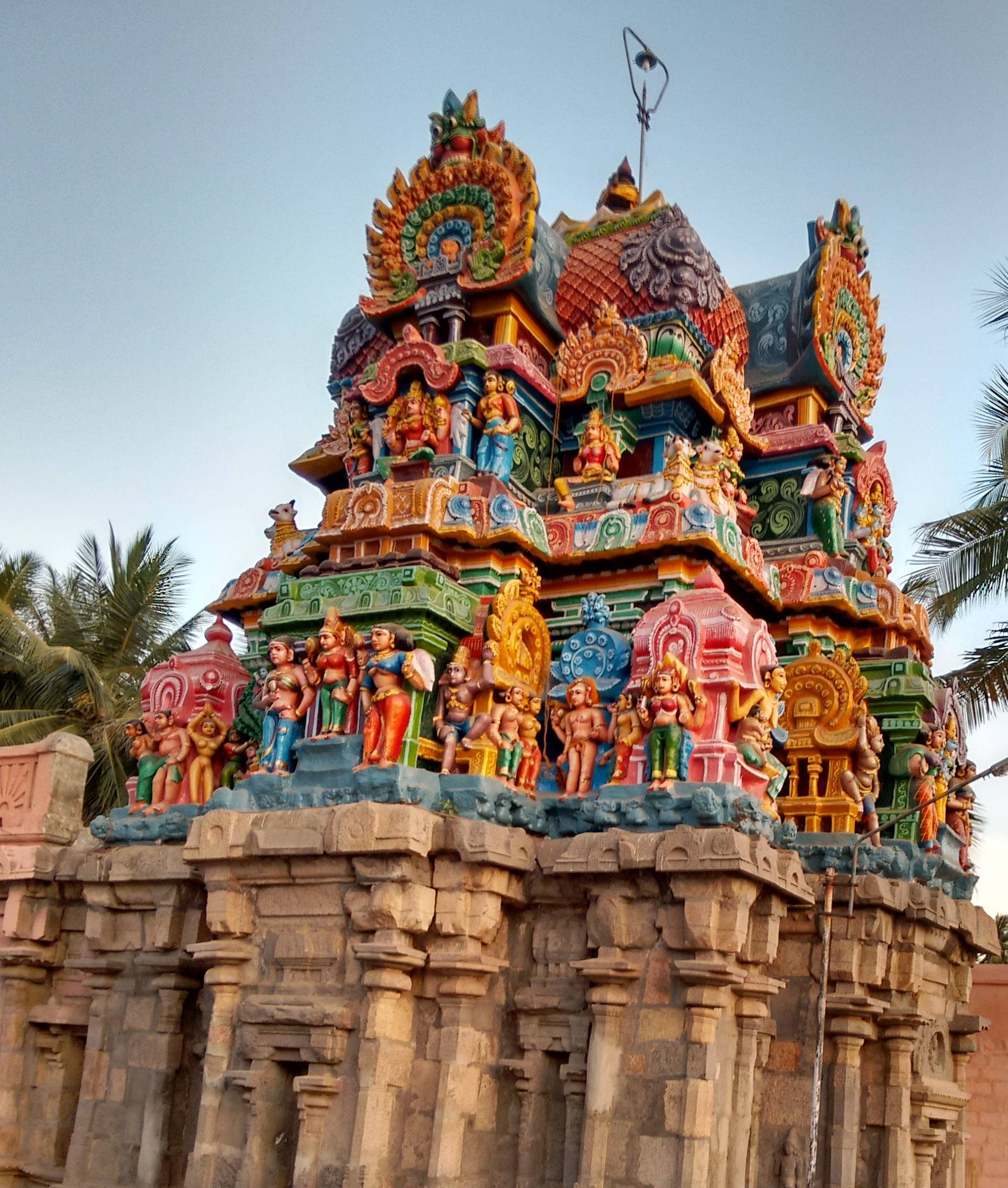
Amman shrine
