= Devangudi =

- village
- Location in Tamil Nadu, India Devangudi (India)
- Coordinates: 10.928867°N 79.166799°E
- Country: India
- State: Tamil Nadu
- District: Thanjavur

Population (2001)
  - Total: 670

Languages
  - Official: Tamil
- Time zone: UTC+5:30 (IST)

Devangudi is a village near Thiruvaiyaru in Thanjavur district, in the Indian state of Tamil Nadu. The village is situated between two principal waterways of South India: the Cauveri River, two kilometers to the north, and the Kollidam River, less than one kilometer to its south. Notable places of worship of this village include a Lord Murugan temple facing west and a lord Vinayagar temple facing east. These two temples were built exactly facing each other in the early 19th century.
