= Aupamanyava =

Vedic sage

In the Vamsa Brahmana of Vedic literature, Aupamanyava is listed as a Vedic sage and teacher of the Sama Veda.

The patronymic Aupamanyava or "Upmanya" establishes him as a descendant of Upamanyu, while the name Kamboja suggests an association with the Kamboja kingdom of the (late Vedic) Mahajanapada period.

The Vamsa Brahmana informs us that sage Anandaja had received Vedic learning from the sage Samba, the son of Sarkaraksa, as well as from Kamboja, the son or descendant of Upamanyu.

== Lineage ==
The Vamsa Brahamana of the Sama Veda refers to one Rsi Madragara Shaungayani as the teacher of Aupamanyava Kamboja. As the name itself suggests, the risi Madragara Shaungayani belonged to the Madra tribe, i.e. the Uttaramadras who inhabited the northernmost reaches of Punjab.

Dr Jain also observes: "Kamboja Aupamanyava, pupil of Madragara, is mentioned in the Vamsa Brahmana. This points to a possible relationship of the Madras or more probably of the Uttaramasdras with the Kambojas, who probably had Indian as well as Iranian affinities".

== As a grammarian ==
Aupamanyava is repeatedly quoted as a grammarian by Yaska in his Nirukta, and also mentioned in respect of the Nisadas and the Panca-janah. Aupamanyava is also stated to have authored one Nighantu—a collection of Vedic words. Pt Bhagva Datta points out that Dr G. Opart had referred to a nirukta (etymology) whose authorship he attributes to a certain Upamanyu.

== Vamsa Brahmana ==
Commenting on the Vamsa Brahmana list of Vedic teachers, Albrecht Weber writes: "One fact deserves to be especially noticed here, namely, that several of the teachers mentioned in the Vamsa Brahmana, by their very names, points us directly to the north-west of India, e.g. Kamboja Aupamanyava, Madaragara Saungayani, Sati Aushtrakshi, Salamkayana and Kauhala". And commenting on the same list, R Morton Smith also writes: "The names Kamboja Aupamanyava, Sati Austraksi and Madragara Saungayani suggest a North-west connection for the main branch of the Vamsa Brahmana."

In all the lists of ancient Vedic teachers in the Satapatha Brahmana as well as the Vamsa Brahmana, Kamboja Aupamanyava appears as the first "Aupamanyava"' (i.e. son or descendant of Upamanyu). This Kamboja Aupamanyava was the guru of Anadaja Chandhanayana who in turn was the guru of Bhanumant Aupamanyava. Bhanumant Aupamanyava had instructed Urjayant Aupamanyava. Vedic teachers Bhanumanta Aupamanyava and Urjayant Aupamanyava of the Vamsa Brahmana list were probably the son and grandson of Kamboja Aupamanyava.

== Aupamanyava/Upamanyu Gotra ==
Upamanyu also is one of the gotras of Hindu Brahmins. The people with Upamanyu gotra live in the far western part of Nepal and the eastern Parts of Jammu & Kashmir. They are thus concentrated at the foothills of Mount Kailash which enables them to easily pray to Lord Shiva. However, according to Dr D. C. Sircar, the Upamanyu gotra is not found in early Sanskrit literature and it is difficult to determine at this time whether it is being confused for what actually is the Aupamanyava gotra.

Prof B. N. Datta comments: "...In the list of Brahmana gotras mentioned in the Matsya-Purana, the name "Kamboja" is to be found. It is said to be an offshoot of the Vrigu (Bhrigus) gotras. This means that a Rishi hailing from the Kamboja tribe was also the founder of a Brahmanical class... Weber says that the appearance of the name of Kamboja (an Indian-sounding name in Vedic texts) as a Sama theologian is analogous to the discovery of the name of Gautama in the Zoroastrian Mithra-Yesht. Upamanyu was of Kamboja descent, and Ushtaxri (Sati Austrakshi) was probably of Bactrian origin. Further, the name of the prominent Rishi Atharva sounds like Atharavan or Atharvan, the Persian fire-cult priest. The names of Atharva and Angirasa are connected with the introduction of fire-cult amongst the Vedic people. In this case, we find another infiltration of the foreign element (Kambojas etc.) in the ethnic composition of the Vedic Aryas".

Though the phrase "vouru-gaoyaoitîm" in Mithra Yasht has the meaning "having good / wide pastures", Weber may have ultimately confused Mithra Yasht with an excerpt of verse 16 of Frawardin Yasht (Yt. 13) "ýô nâidyånghô gaotemahe", referring to the proper name "Gaotema" or "Gotama".
