= Thirupadiripuliyur railway station =

Railway station in Tamil Nadu, India

Thirupadiripuliyur
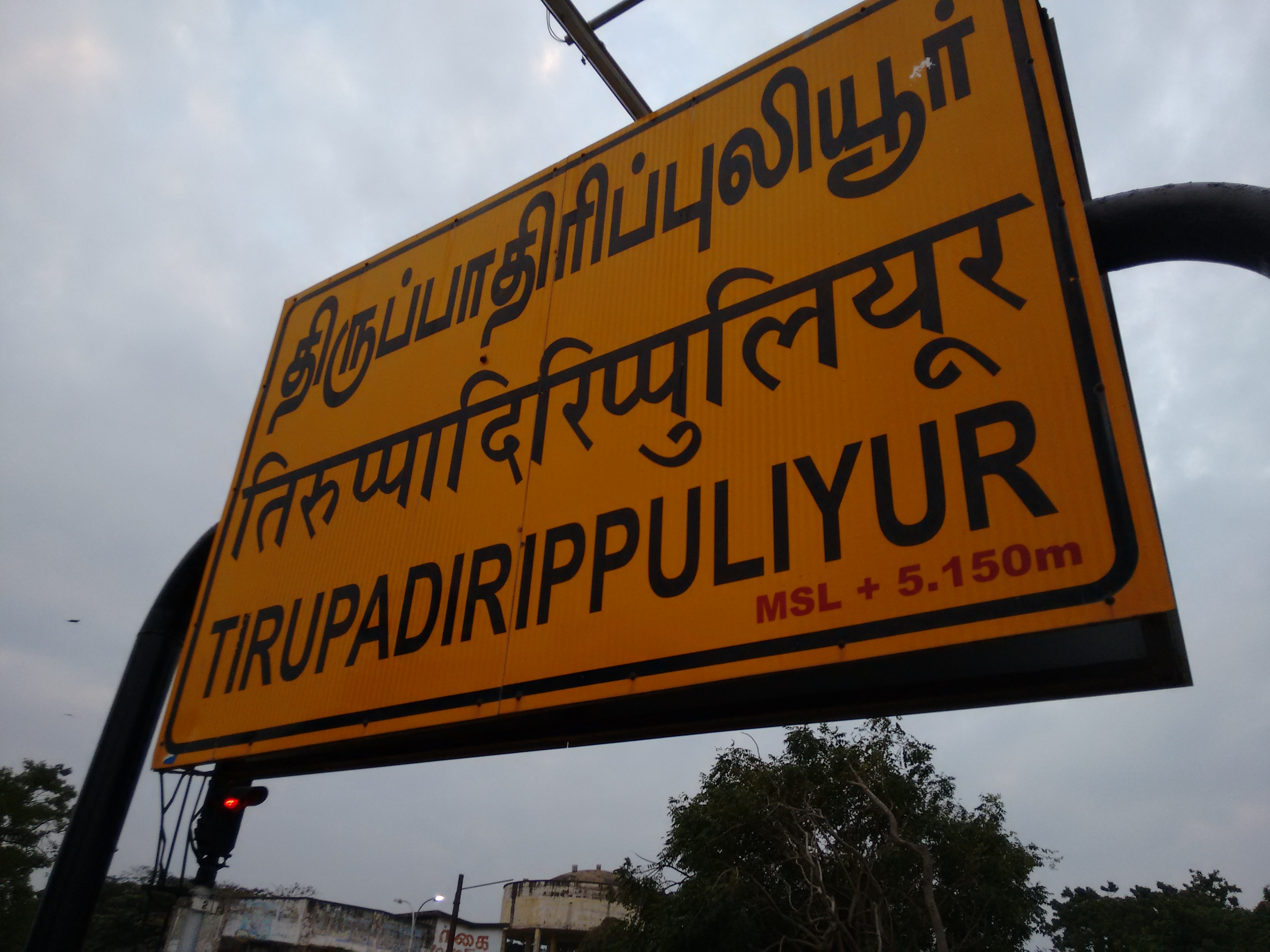

General information
- Location: Thirupathiripuliyur, Cuddalore, Tamil Nadu; India
- Coordinates: 11°44′N 79°45′E
- Elevation: 10 m (33 ft)
- System: Indian Railways station
- Owner: Indian Railways
- Operator: Southern Railway zone
- Line: Chennai Egmore–Villupuram–Mayiladuthurai–Thanjavur main line
- Platforms: 2
- Tracks: 2, 5 ft 6 in (1,676 mm) broad gauge

Construction
- Structure type: Standard (on-ground station)
- Accessible: Yes

Other information
- Status: Functioning
- Station code: TDPR
- Zone(s): Southern Railway zone
- Division(s): Tiruchirappalli

History
- Electrified: 25Kva 50 HZ

Services
Preceding station	Indian Railways	Following station
Varakalpattu towards	Southern Railway zone Chennai Egmore–Villupuram–Mayiladuthurai–Thanjavur main line	Cuddalore Port Junction towards
Location
- Location within Tamil Nadu

Thirupadiripuliyur railway station (code: TDPR) is one of the two railway stations serving the town of Cuddalore, headquarters of the Cuddalore district in Tamil Nadu, India, the other one being Cuddalore Port Junction. It is located on the main line between Chennai Egmore and Tiruchirappalli Junction. It comes under the Tiruchirappalli railway division of the Southern Railway zone. This railway station was mentioned in Jayakanthan's novel.

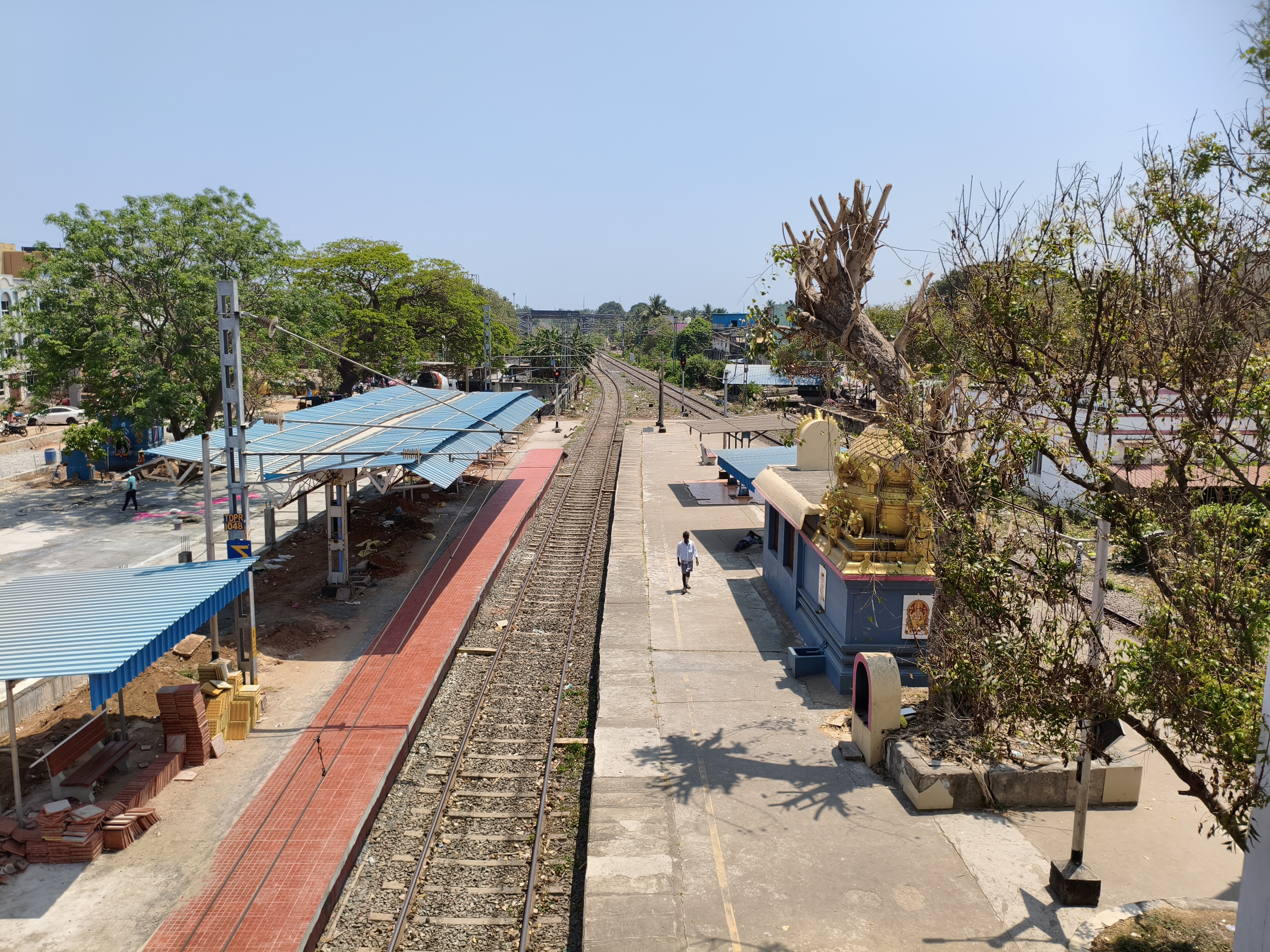
Platforms 2 and 3 of Thirupadiripuliyur railway station

== Location and layout ==
The railway station is located off the Subbrayalu Nagar, Thirupapuliyur, Cuddalore. The nearest bus depot is located in Cuddalore while the nearest airport is situated 23 kilometres (14 mi) away in Puducherry.

== Lines ==
The station is a focal point of the historic main line that connects Chennai with places like Nagapattinam Junction, Karaikkudi Junction, Thiruvarur Junction, Rameswaram etc.
