= Upamanyu =

Sage in Hinduism

- Affiliation: Rishi
- Texts: Puranas, Mahabharata, Vedas

Genealogy
- Parents: Vyāghrapāda (father)
- Children: Kamboja Aupamanyava

Upamanyu (Sanskrit: उपमन्यु, romanized: Upamanyu, lit. 'zealous') is a rishi (sage) in Hinduism, best known for being a devotee of the deity Shiva, and being the leader of the ganas (Gāṇamtya).

He is said to be the father or ancestor of the sage Kamboja Aupamanyava referred to in the Vamsa Brahmana (1.18) of the Sama Veda.

== Legend ==
In the Shiva Purana, Upamanyu is stated to be the son of Sage Vyāghrapāda. Once, he drank his fill of milk at his uncle's ashrama, and urged his mother to offer him milk as well. Dejected that she could not offer her son milk because of their family's poverty, she offered him a milk substitute instead, which he rejected. Upamanyu's mother then told him to devote himself to Shiva, who would grant him what he wished. The boy resolved to perform a penance to Shiva to ask for an ocean of milk, to which his mother offered her consent. He travelled to the Himalayas, where he built a lingam and started to chant the Panchaksharam. He was harassed by a number of ghosts sent by Marichi, but was resolute. Upamanyu's penance was so powerful that he started to cause Devaloka to burn. The devas hastened to Vaikuntha to inform Vishnu, who in turn brought these tidings to Shiva. Shiva assumed the disguise of Indra and visited the boy, asking him to seek a boon of his choice. Upamanyu chose to be devoted to Shiva as his boon. Shiva asked Upamanyu to abandon him, and made a number of disparaging remarks against himself. Infuriated, Upamanyu chanted the Panchaksharam, cupped some ash, and hurled it at Shiva. The Aghorāstra he hurled was gently extinguished by Shiva, and the latter assumed his true form. Greatly pleased, Shiva offered his devotee all the milk he desired, and endowed him with sacred rites and knowledge.

== See also ==
- Yajnavalkya
- Nachiketa
- Aurva
