= Thirupathiripuliyur =

Thirupathiripuliyur Thirupapuliyur
- Town
- Location in Tamil Nadu, India
- Coordinates: 11.74846°N 79.74828°E
- Country: India
- State: Tamil Nadu
- District: Cuddalore
- Taluk: Cuddalore
- Block: Cuddalore

Languages
  - Official: Tamil
- Time zone: UTC+5:30 (IST)
- Vehicle registration: TN-31

Thirupathiripuliyur is a neighbourhood of Cuddalore, Tamil Nadu, India. It is named for the ancient Hindu temple located in the locale, which is named after the Pathiri tree and Puliyur, a tiger-legged saint who obtained absolution in the area.

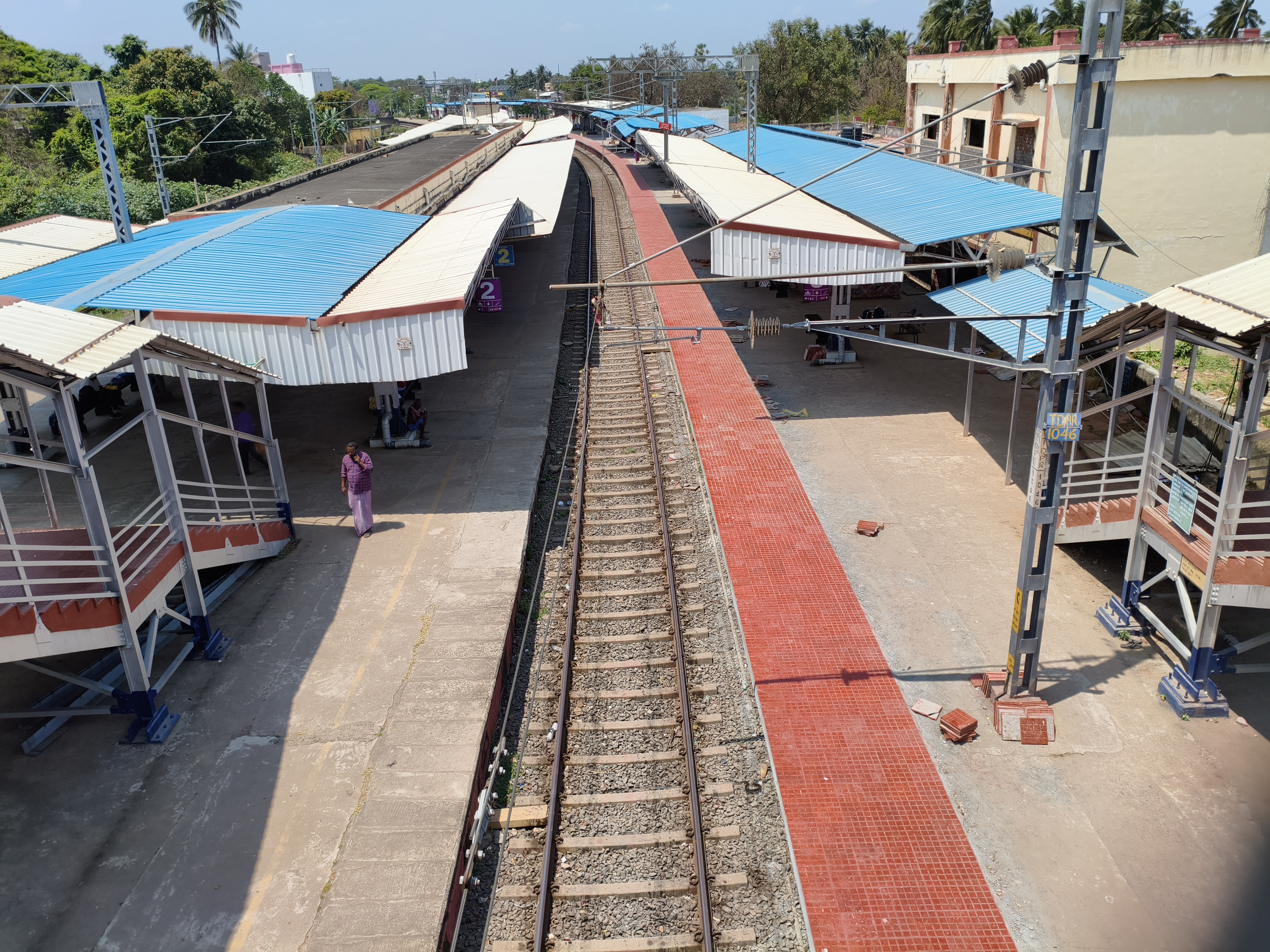
Railway station at Thirupathiripuliyur

== Padaleeswarar Temple ==
Padaleeswarar temple is among the ancient 274 Siva temples whose history reportedly dates back to more than 2,000 years.

The nearest railway station to the temple is Thirupadiripuliyur. The temple is 0.5km from Thiruppathiripuliyur Railway Station and situated in Cuddalore. This is one of the temples that is a Paadal Petra Sthalam situated in Nadunadu. Here the name of the main deity is Padaleeswarar, and the Goddess is Periyanayaki or Arundhava nayaki.

== History ==
The temple plays a unique role in the history of Hindu religion, art, and architecture.

Padaleeswarar Temple is a Hindu shrine dedicated to Lord Shiva in the town of Cuddalore. It was constructed during the Pallava and Medieval Chola periods. The lord of this temple saved Saint Appar from drowning when he was tied with a stone column and launched into sea as per the orders of the then Pallava king Mahendra Varman. Appar, along with the stone, floated on the sea and safely drifted ashore here at Thirupathiripuliyur by the grace of god. Overwhelmed, he sang the thevaram "Eendralumai enaku endhaiyumai" in praise of the lord.

There is a belief/myth that by worshiping this god one single time is equal to 16 times worshiping the Shiva in Kasi, eight times in Thiruvannamalai, and three times in Chidambaram.
