= Sirupuliyur =

- village
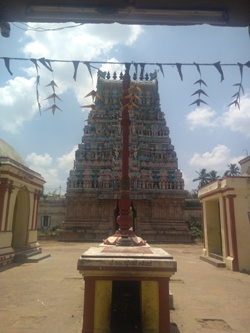
- The temple in 2019

- Location in Tamil Nadu, India Sirupuliyur (India)
- Coordinates: 10°59′26″N 79°40′11″E
- Country: India
- State: Tamil Nadu
- District: Thiruvarur

Languages
  - Official: Tamil
- Time zone: UTC+5:30 (IST)

Sirupuliyur is a village in the Nannilam taluk of Thiruvarur district, Tamil Nadu, India. It is the site of the Sthalasayana Perumal Temple, a Hindu temple to Vishnu.
