= Thiruvaiyaru =

- Town
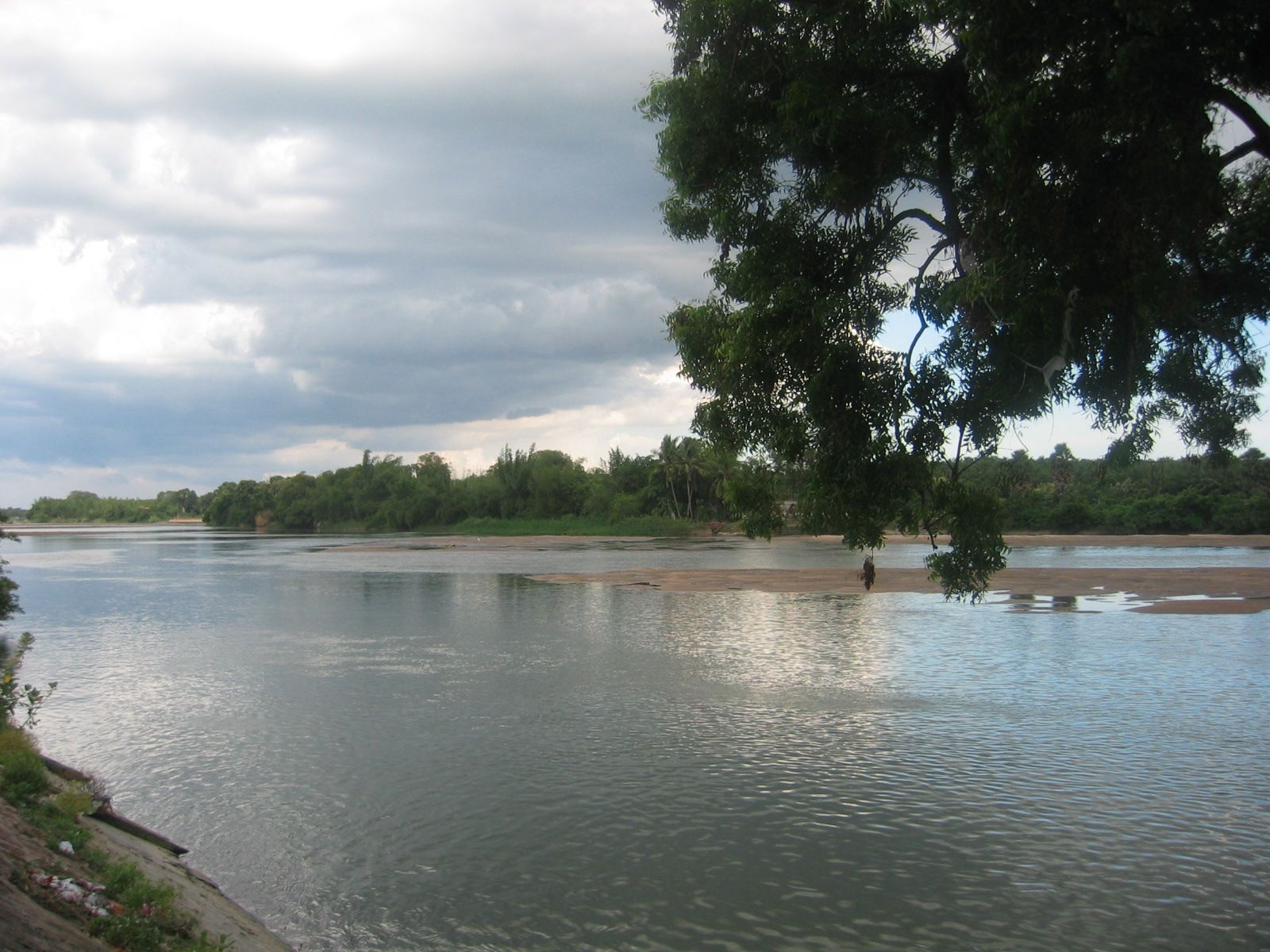
- The Kaveri River at Thiruvaiyaru

- Location in Tamil Nadu, India
- Coordinates: 10.88°N 79.1°E
- Country: India
- State: Tamil Nadu
- District: Thanjavur
- Region: Chola Nadu

Government
  - Body: Municipality
- Elevation: 38 m (125 ft)

Population (2011)
  - Total: 26,164

Languages
  - Official: Tamil
- Time zone: UTC+5:30 (IST)
- Postal code: 613204

Thiruvaiyaru (also spelled as Tiruvaiyaru or Tiruvayyaru) is a town in Thanjavur District in the Indian state of Tamil Nadu.

== Etymology ==
Thiruvaiyaru means Five Rivers South of the city to 12 KMs to reach Thanjavur city. These Five Rivers are running West to East on the highway from Thanjavur to Thiruvaiyaru. The names of these five rivers are Vadavaar, Vennaar, Vettaar, Kudamurutti and Kaveri. On the highway from Thanjavur, you pass through these five bridges over the Vadavar, Vettar, Vennar, Kudamurutt, Kaveri rivers to reach Thiruvaiyaru. Thiruvaiyaru gets its name (thiru = sacred; ai(ndhu) = five; aaru = river)

== History ==
The vast temple in this town, known as "Dakshina Kailasam" (Southern abode of Siva), built in an area of approximately 60,000 square meters, has five prakaram (outer precincts used for religious purposes) and many 'mandapams' (great halls). Several inscriptions in the temple affiliates the temple to the Cholas, Pandyas, and other rulers. Karikala Chola, Rajaraja the Great, Jatavarman Sundara Pandyan, and Krishna Devarayar are associated with Thiruvaiyaru. The temple has two distinct divisions called 'Uttarakailasam' and 'Dakshinakailasam'. Uttarakailasam was built by Rajaraja Chola's chief queen Dantisaktivitanki alias Lokamahadevi in the late 10th century who also made several endowments. It was called Lokamahadevi Isvaram Udaiyar Mahadevar after the queen herself. She endowed several musical instruments during the time of Rajaraja while his daughter Gangamahadevi alias Arumoli Chandramalli gifted several fly-whisks to the presiding deity. Dakshina kailasam was renovated by Rajendra Cholan's queen. The Tevaram trinity (Appar, Sambandar, and Sundarar) have composed more than 100 songs on the presiding deity of this temple town. The town is called as "Ai-aaru" (ஐயாறு), meaning five rivers, by them.

== Geography ==
Thiruvaiyaru is situated on the banks of the river Kaveri, 11 km (6.8 mi) from North of Thanjavur.

Thiruvaiyaru is located at 10.88°N 79.1°E. It has an average elevation of 38 metres (124 feet).

== Demographics ==
=== Population ===
The Thiruvaiyaru Municipality has population of 16,164 of which 7,895 are males while 8,269 are females as per report released by Census India 2011. Males constitute 50% of the population and females 50%. Thiruvaiyaru has an average literacy rate of 76%, higher than the national average of 59.5%: male literacy is 81%, and female literacy is 70%. In Thiruvaiyaru, 9% of the population is under 6 years of age.

== Government and politics ==
Thiruvaiyaru is the headquarters of the Thiruvaiyaru taluk. Tiruvaiyaru assembly constituency is part of Thanjavur (Lok Sabha constituency).

=== Police ===
On the law and order front, Thiruvaiyaru has a Munsif court and police stations (including an all women police station) to tackle crime and other issues related to civic unrest.

== Economy ==
Most of the shops and businesses include services for farmers from nearby villages. Other than services and retail, Important sectors that provide employment in the town are state government, health, primary education.

The town area is densely populated and lined up with a litany of retail shops ranging from small to medium. The main business areas are South street, Theradi (where the temple car is parked) and Odathurai street where the new revamped bus stand with retail shops and daily markets are located. Thiruvaiyaru has a Government hospital in and a few (3+) 24/7 private hospitals as well.

== Culture/Cityscape ==
=== Tourist Attractions ===
Thiruvaiyaru has an old Siva temple dedicated to Aiyarappar or Panchanatheeswar.

=== Music and films ===
Thiruvaiyaru is more renowned for its association with Saint Thyagaraja, who, along with Muthuswami Dikshitar and Shyama Sastri, comprised the Trinity of Carnatic music.

Thiruvaiyaru is known for its annual Thyagaraja Aradhana music festival. There are so many private music teachers and Bharathanatiyam teachers available in town.The only tertiary education provider in town, Tamil Nadu Government Music College offers courses in music from Diploma through to Doctoral programs

=== Famous persons ===
Near the Shiva temple is the one-roomed house where Thyagaraja composed some of his greatest works. Thyagaraja was interred on the banks of the river Kaveri and it is called the revered Samadhi (burial place) of the saint composer and it is here that the greatest music festival in the country takes place annually. Nearby are the Samadhis (burial places) of some of the other saints like Shiva Prakasha Swamigal and Bangalore Nagaratnamma, who established the statue of Sri Thyagaraja and built a mandapam around it.

The Thyagaraja Aradhana festival is held in the Bahula Panchami Thithi of Margazhi (Margashirsha)Tamil month which falls on December or January when most of the leading exponents of Carnatic music come to perform and are watched by thousands of ardent fans of classical music. A huge complex is built at this site to accommodate the large audience that come to the concert in ever increasing numbers every year.

== Transport ==
=== By Air ===
The nearest airport to reach Thiruvaiyaru is at Thiruchirapalli, which is located at a distance of about 56 km.

=== By Rail ===
Nearest railway station is situated at Thanjavur (13 km) and another railway station at Ariyalur (30 km)[Trichy-Chennai line]

=== By Road ===
There is a direct bus service from Thanjavur, which lies at a distance of 11 km from Thiruvaiyaru. National Highway No.136 from Thanjavur connect Thiruvaiyaru, Ariyalur, Perambalur bypass and Aththur bypass. State roads to Kumbakonam at 37 km (23 mi) in the East and Kallanai 33 km in the West connect Thiruvaiyaru.

== Education ==
=== Schools ===
- Amalraj Matriculation Higher Secondary School,
- Srinivasarao Higher Secondary School
- Balaganapathy Vidhya sala School
- Government girls Higher Secondary School,
- St.Joseph's High School,
- Immaculate Matriculation School
- Saraswathi Ambal Aided Primary School
- Avvai primary school
- Govt high school kandiyur

There is a dedicated Government Musical college in Thiruvaiyaru, Tamil Nadu, which operates under the Department of Art and Culture affiliated with The Tamil Nadu Dr. J. Jayalalithaa Music and Fine Arts University, Chennai.

== Adjacent communities ==
- Thanjavur - 11 km
- Thirukkattupalli - 18 km
- Kallanai - 33 km
- Poondi Madha Kovil - 20 km
- Ariyalur - 30 km
- Thirumanur - 6 km
- Kumbakonam -33 km
- Kandiyur - 2 km
- Mathur - 7 km
- Chennai - 335 km

== Gallery ==
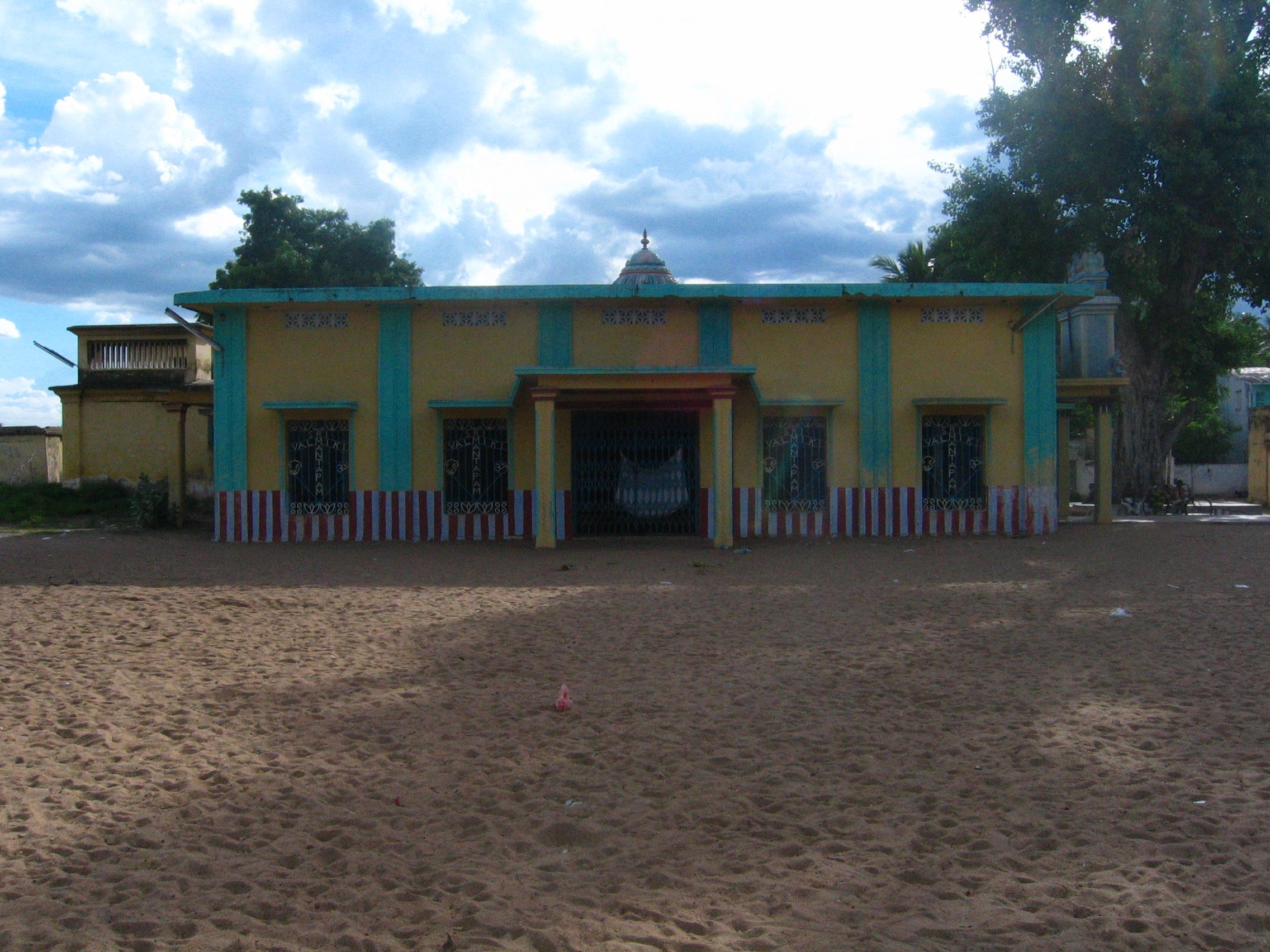
The memorial to Tyāgarāja, a celebrated composer of Carnatic music who lived in Thiruvayuru

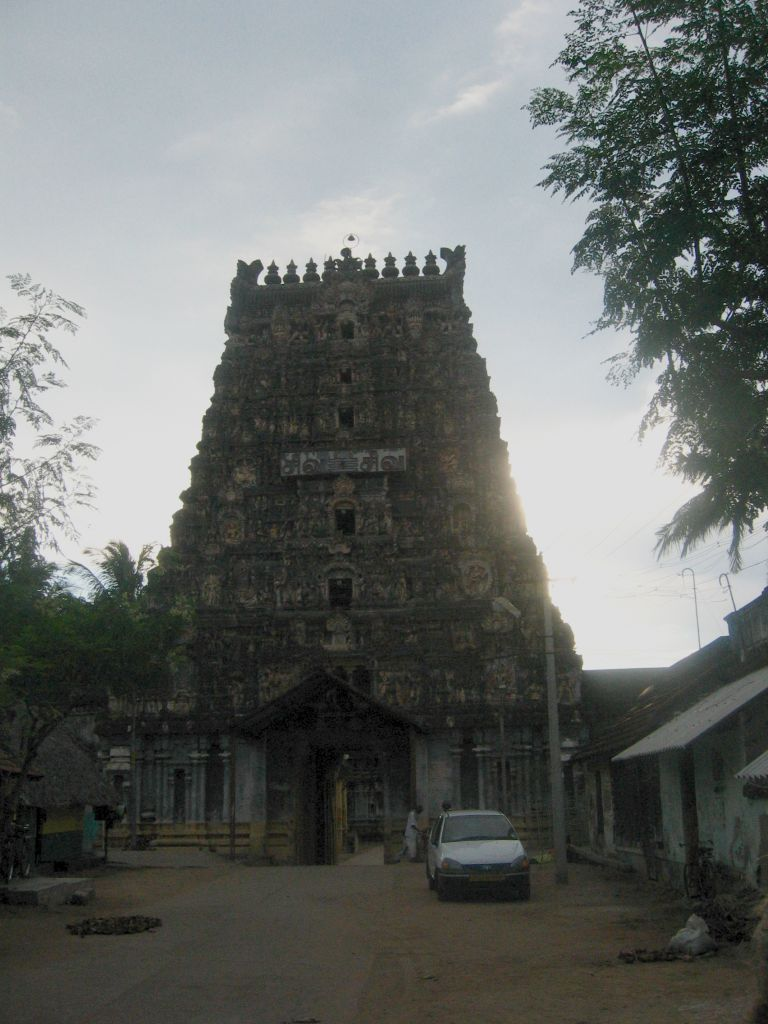
The Aiyāṟappar temple, an ancient temple to Siva

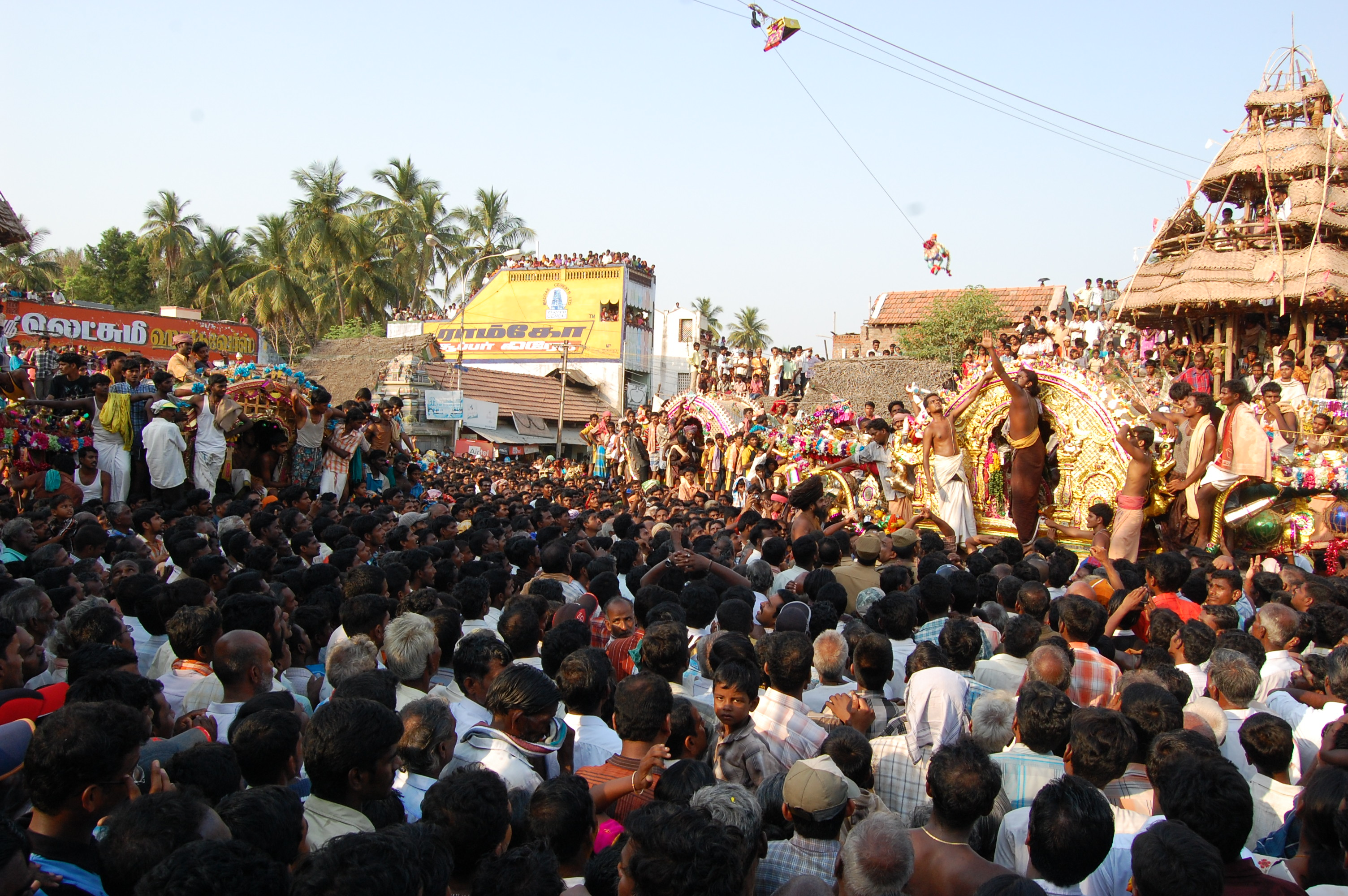
Poochorithal (flower festival)

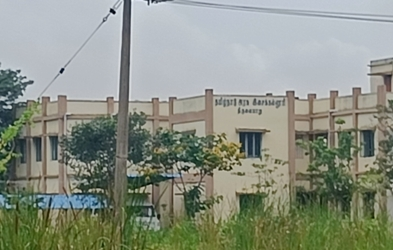
Music College, Thiruvayaru

== See also ==
- Devangudi
