= Omampuliyur Thuyartheertanathar Temple =

Hindu temple in Tamil Nadu, India

Coordinates: 11.2144°N 79.5583°E

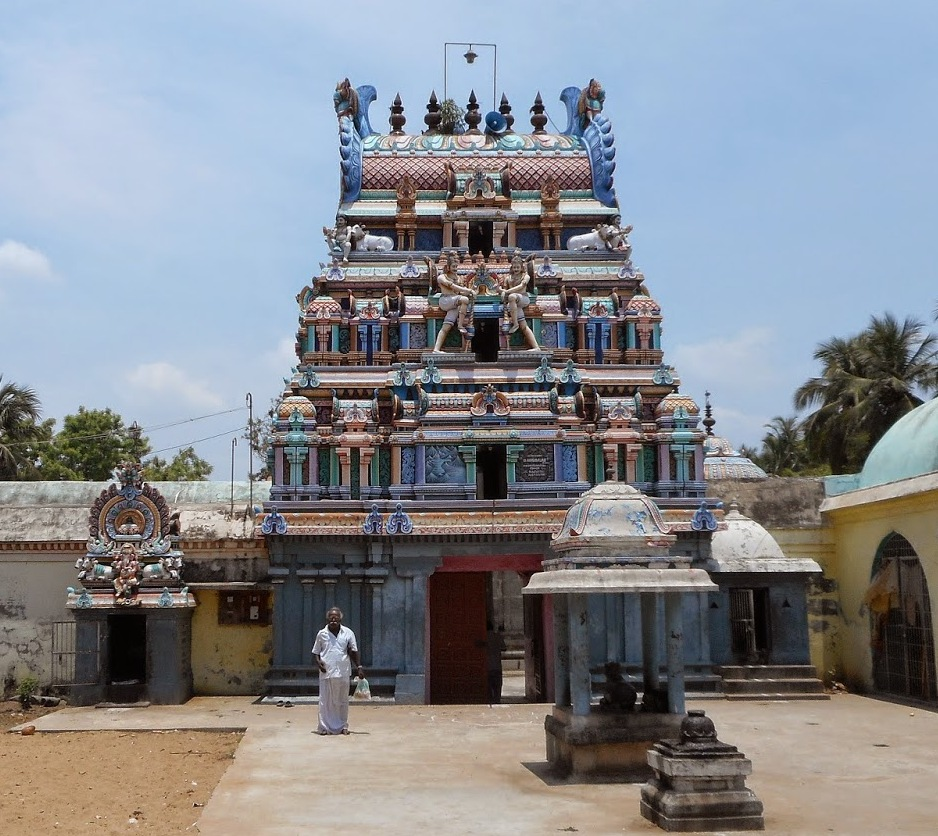
The entrance of the temple

Omampuliyur Thuyartheertanathar Temple (ஓமாம்புலியூர் துயர்தீர்த்தநாதர் கோயில்) is a Hindu temple located at Omapuliyur in Cuddalore district of Tamil Nadu, India. The historical name of the place is Umapuliyur. The presiding deity is Shiva. He is called as Pranava Vyakrapureeswar . His consort is known as Poongodi Nayaki. The temple is one of the few temples where Dakshinamurthy is present inside the sanctum.

== Significance ==
It is one of the shrines of the 275 Paadal Petra Sthalams - Shiva Sthalams glorified in the early medieval Tevaram poems by Tamil Saivite Nayanars Tirugnanasambandar and Tirunavukkarasar. The temple is counted as one of the temples built on the northern banks of River Kaveri.

== Nava Puliyur Temples ==
This is one of the Nava Puliyur Temples worshipped by Patanjali and Vyaghrapada.

== Literary mention ==
Tirgnanasambandar describes the feature of the deity as:

கள்ளவிழ் மலர்மே லிருந்தவன் கரியோ னென்றிவர் காண்பரி தாய

ஒள்ளெரி யுருவ ருமையவ ளொடு முகந்தினி துறைவிடம் வினவில்
பள்ளநீர் வாளை பாய்தரு கழனிப் பனிமலர்ச் சோலைசூ ழாலை

ஒள்ளிய புகழா ரோமமாம் புலியூ ருடையவர் வடதளி யதுவே.

Tirunavukkarasar describes the feature of the deity as:

அன்றினவர் புரமூன்றும் பொடியாய் வேவ அழல்விழித்த கண்ணானை அமரர் கோனை

வென்றிமிகு காலனுயிர் பொன்றி வீழ விளங்குதிரு வடியெடுத்த விகிர்தன் தன்னை
ஒன்றியசீர் இருபிறப்பர் முத்தீ யோம்பும் உயர்புகழ்நான் மறைஓமாம் புலியூர் நாளும்

தென்றல்மலி வடதளியெஞ் செல்வன் தன்னைச் சேராதே திகைத்துநாள் செலுத்தி னேனே.
