= Thirumazhapadi =

- village
- Country: India
- State: Tamil Nadu
- District: Ariyalur

Government
  - Body: MUNNAM THIRUMAZHAPADI FROM 1998; Mazhavai Foundation

Population (2001)
  - Total: 2,718

Languages
  - Official: Tamil
- Time zone: UTC+5:30 (IST)
- PIN: 621851
- Telephone code: 04329
- Vehicle registration: TN-61
- Coastline: 0 kilometres (0 mi)
- Nearest city: Thanjavur
- Sex ratio: 1010 ♂/♀
- Literacy: 76.08%
- Lok Sabha constituency: Chidambaram
- Civic agency: MUNNAM THIRUMAZHAPADI FROM 1998; Mazhavai Foundation

Thirumazhapadi is a village in the Ariyalur taluk of Ariyalur district, Tamil Nadu, India.

== Demographics ==
As per the 2001 census, Thirumazhapadi had a total population of 2718 with 1352 males and 1366 females.
