= Tirupperumpuliyur Vyakrapureeswarar Temple =

Hindu temple in Tamil Nadu, India

Tirupperumpuliyur Vyakrapureeswarar Temple is a Hindu temple at Perumpuliyur in Thanjavur district of Tamil Nadu, India. The presiding deity is Shiva, called Vyakrapureeswarar. His consort is known as Soundaryanayaki.

It is one of the shrines of the 275 Paadal Petra Sthalams - Shiva Sthalams mentioned in the early medieval Tevaram poems by Tamil Saivite Nayanar Tirugnanasambandar. It is one of the temples built on the northern banks of River Kaveri. It is one of the Nava Puliyur Temples worshipped by Patanjali and Vyaghrapada.
