= Pataleeswarar Temple, Cuddalore =

Padaleeswarar Temple
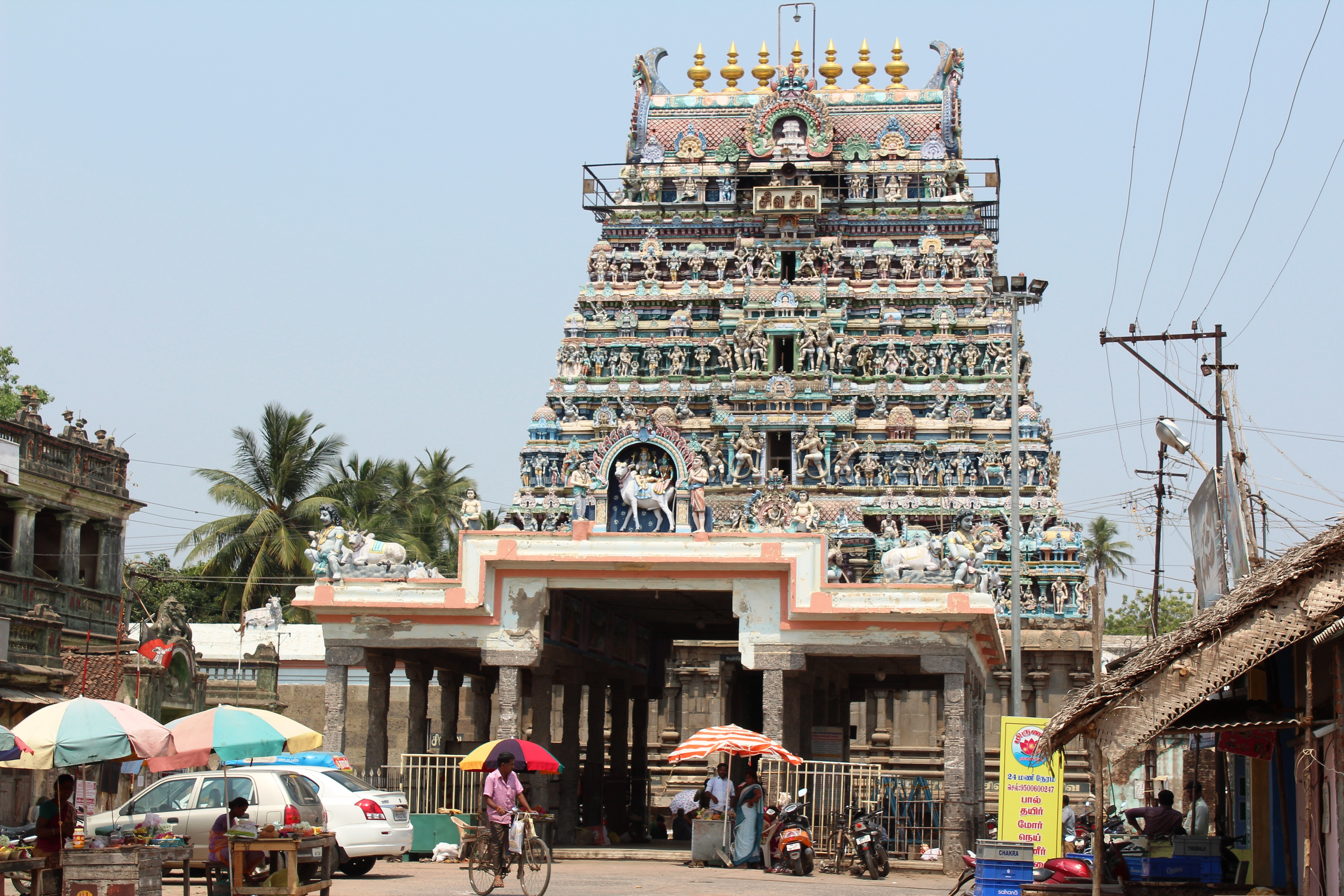

Religion
- Affiliation: Hinduism
- Deity: Padaleeswarar (Shiva) and Periya Nayagi (Parvati)

Location
- Location: cuddalore
- State: Tamil Nadu
- Country: India
- Interactive map of Padaleeswarar Temple

Architecture
- Type: South Indian Architecture
- Creator: Pallavas, Cholas
- Completed: 2000 years ago (Approx)

Pataleeswarar Temple (பாடலீஸ்வரர் கோயில்) is a Hindu shrine dedicated to Shiva in the town of Thirupathiripuliyur, Cuddalore. It was constructed during the Pallava and Medieval Chola periods.

The Saivite saint Appar is believed to have adopted Saivism at this temple. It is one of the shrines of the 275 Paadal Petra Sthalams. There is a belief/myth that by worshiping this God a single time is equal to 16 times worshiping the Shiva in Kasi, eight times in Thiruvannamalai, and three times in Chidambaram.

Thirupathiripuliyur in Cuddalore is one of the ancient temples in Tamil Nadu. It is named after the Pathiri Tree and the Puliyur, a tiger-legged saint who obtained absolution in the area. The temple has a large temple car called Theeruvadaichan, a silver chariot and a golden chariot.

== Nava Puliyur Temples ==
This is one of the Nava Puliyur Temples worshipped by Patanjali and Vyaghrapada.

== Architecture ==
The temple is constructed in Dravidian style of architecture. It is classified as Gnazhar Koil (ஞாழற் கோயில்), where the image of the presiding deity is set up under Gnazhar trees (ஞாழல் மரம் - Senna sophera) . Trees like Kondrai (கொன்றை), Kongu and Theekku (teak) all fall in the category. The temples constructed in wood made from Gnazhal trees are also classified as Gnzhar Koil . Literary evidence is found in the works of Tirugnanasambandar, who refers the temple as Gnazhar Koil.

== Location ==
The temple is located in Thirupathiripuliyur at the center of Cuddalore town. The temple is 0.5 KM from Thirupathiripuliyur Railway Station (code: TDPR) and is roughly the same distance from Cuddalore Main Bus Stand. It is 20 KM south of Pondicherry and is on the way to Chidambaram. Padaleeswarar Temple is one of the ancient temples in Tamil Nadu. The temple plays a unique role in the history of Hindu religion, art, and architecture.

== Religious significance ==
The Shaiva saint Appar's sister Thilakavathiyar was living in Thiruvathigai during her later years and devoted her lifetime service to Shiva. Afflicted by a painful illness, Appar, who was originally called Dharmasenar and was then a staunch follower of Jainism, prayed for relief at this temple where his sister served. By the divine grace of Shiva, he was cured. He embraced Shaivism from then and started canonizing various temples with his verses. The ruling Pallava king namely Kadava punished Appar in various ways and finally dropped him in a lime kiln. He was subsequently cast on the waters of sea, where he started floating and was pushed ashore in Thirupathipuliyur. It is believed that some of his best songs were sung at this time in praise of the presiding deities at Padaleeswarar temple and Veerateneeswarar temple. Influenced by the greatness of the poet, the king himself converted from Jainism to Shaivism.
