= Thirukumaresar temple =

Thirukumaresar Temple
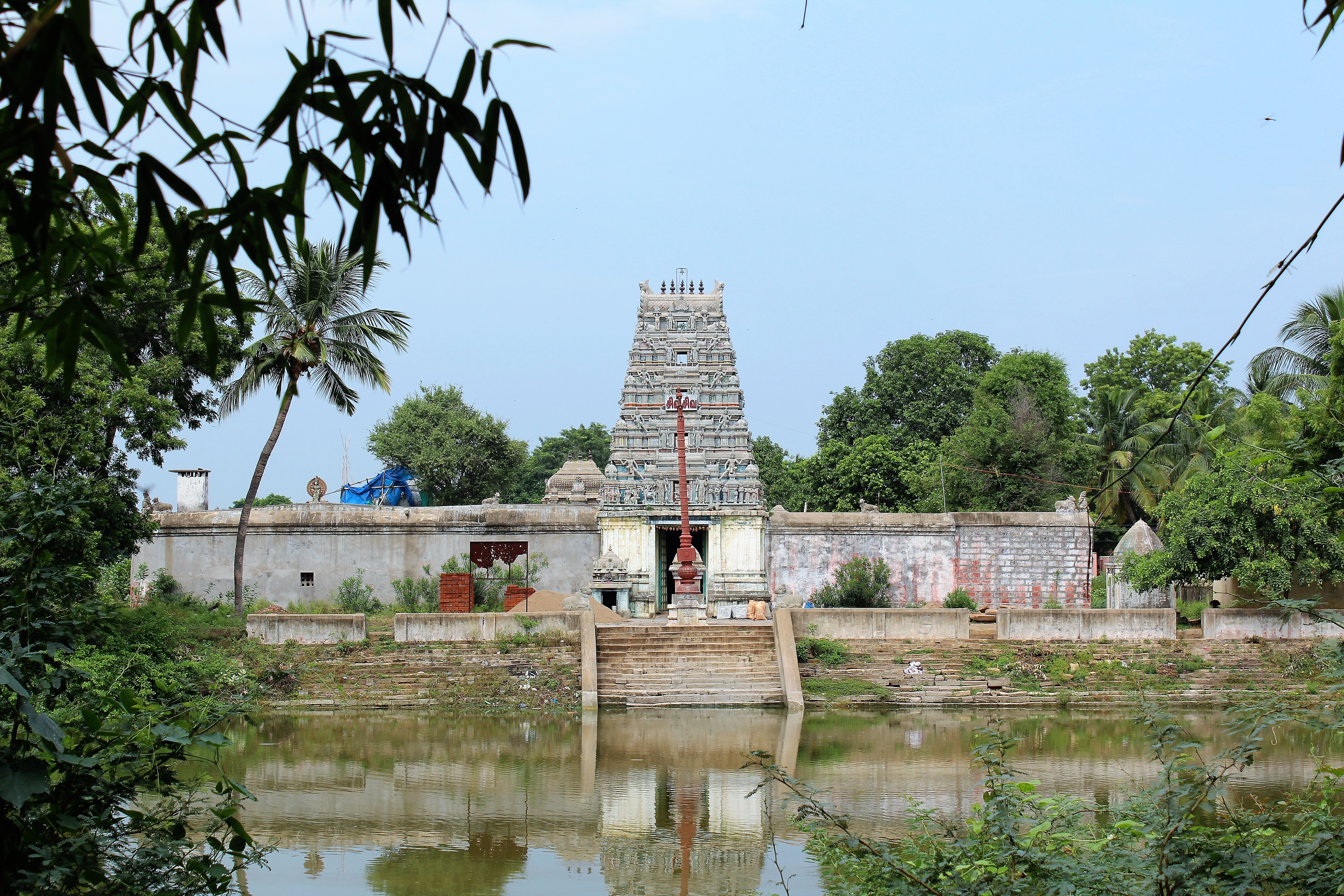

- Location in Tamil Nadu

Religion
- Affiliation: Hinduism
- District: Cuddalore
- Deity: Thirukumaresar(Shiva)

Location
- State: Tamil Nadu
- Country: India
- Coordinates: 11°25′26″N 79°20′52″E

Architecture
- Type: Dravidian architecture

Thirukumaresar Temple (also called Thiruneelakandeswarar) is a Hindu temple to the deity Shiva, in Rajendirapattinam (also known as Erukathampuliyur) a village in Cuddalore district in the Indian state of Tamil Nadu. Shiva is worshipped as Thirukumaresar, and is represented by the lingam. His consort Parvati is depicted as Verumulai Amman. The presiding deity is mentioned in the 7th century Tamil Saiva canonical work, the Tevaram. The temple is also the birthplace of Saiva saint Tirunilakanta Yazhpana Nayanar. The temple complex covers around half acre and entered through a five tiered gopuram, the main gateway.

== Legend ==
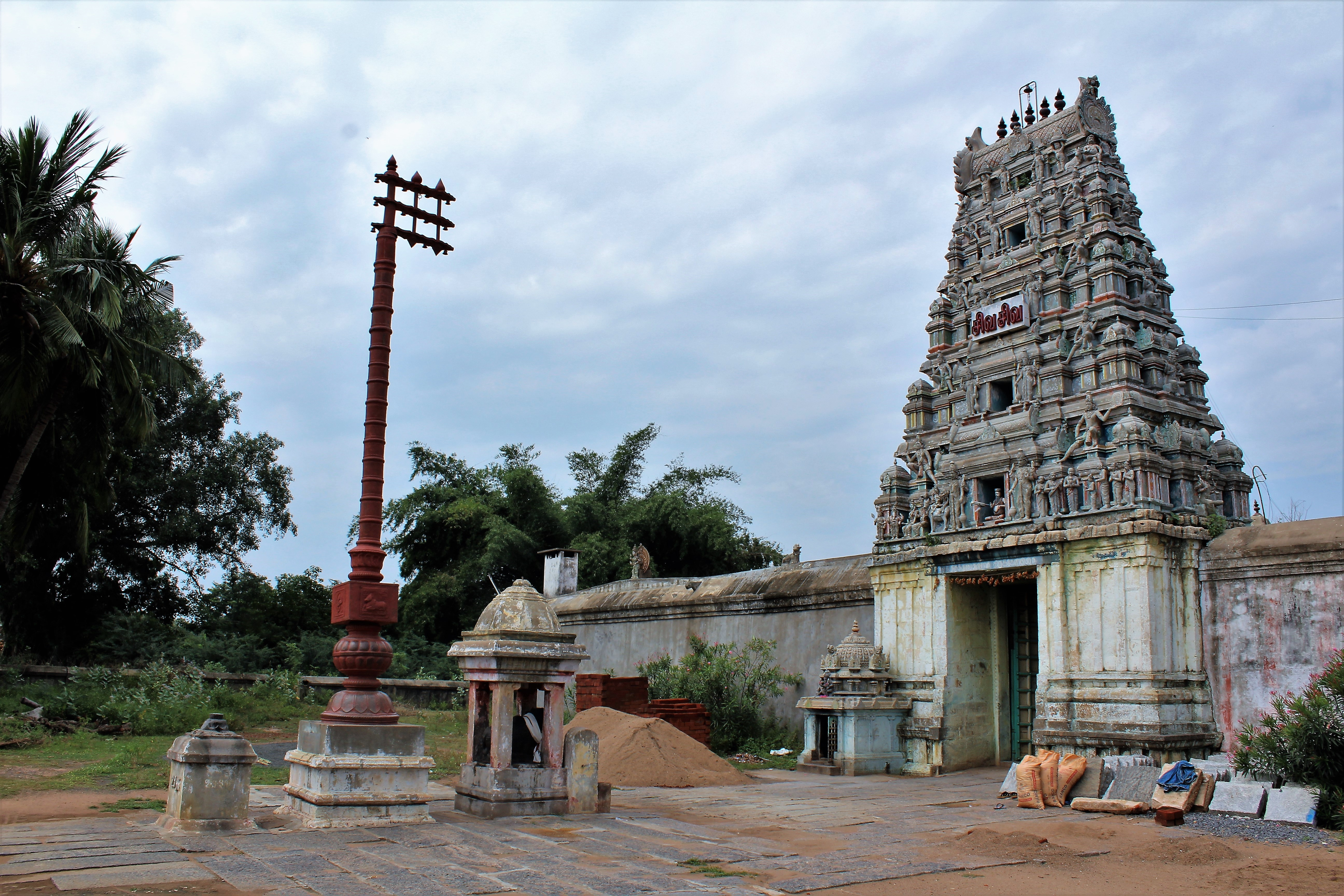
The gopuram of the temple

As per Hindu legend, once Shiva was explaining the importance of Vedas and Agamas to Parvathi in Kailash. She was not paying attention and Shiva cursed her to born in earth in Bharathava community. Muruga, their son was angered that his father cursed Parvathi and argued with him. Shiva was further angered and he cursed Muruga also be born as a dumb boy in trader community. He was born as Rudrasarma in Madurai to an army lieutenant. The boy went to many Shiva temples for relief and when he finally came to the temple for worship, he got his speech.

As per another legend, the celestial deities were enjoying the place and took the form of birds. Some hunters were trying to hunt them and by divine intervention, the hunters turned into Erukam trees whose wood is not useful. Thus the place came to be known as Erukathampuliyur.

== Architecture ==
Thirukumaresar temple is located in Vridhachalam - Jayankondam highway, 13 km (8.1 mi) from Vridhachalam. The temple has a three-tiered gateway tower and all the shrines of the temple are enclosed in concentric rectangular granite walls. The temple occupies an area of around 0.5 acres (0.20 ha). The central shrine houses the image of Shiva as Thirukumaresar in the form of Lingam. The shrine of Parvati - the consort of Shiva - as Veramulai Amman, facing West is located in the Mahamandapam leading to the sanctum. The central shrine is approached through the flagstaff and Mahamandapam, both which are located axial to the gateway. As in other Shiva temples in Tamil Nadu, the shrines of Vinayaka (Ganesha), Murugan (Kartikeya), Navagraha, Chandikesa and Durga are located around the precinct of the main shrine. The temple tank is located opposite to the temple and is called Nilorpala Theertham. There is a shrine for Thiruneelakanta Nayanar and Sattanathar at an elevated plane. There are images of Thiruneelakanta Yazhpanar along with Mathanga Choodamaniyar. The shrines around the sanctum houses the images of Mahaganapathi (form of Ganesha), Viswanatha (form of Shiva), Vishalakshi (form of Parvati), Murugan and Lakshmi.

The original complex is believed to have been built by Cholas, while the present masonry structure was built during the Nayak during the 16th century. In modern times, the temple is maintained and administered by the Hindu Religious and Charitable Endowments Department of the Government of Tamil Nadu.

== Religious importance ==
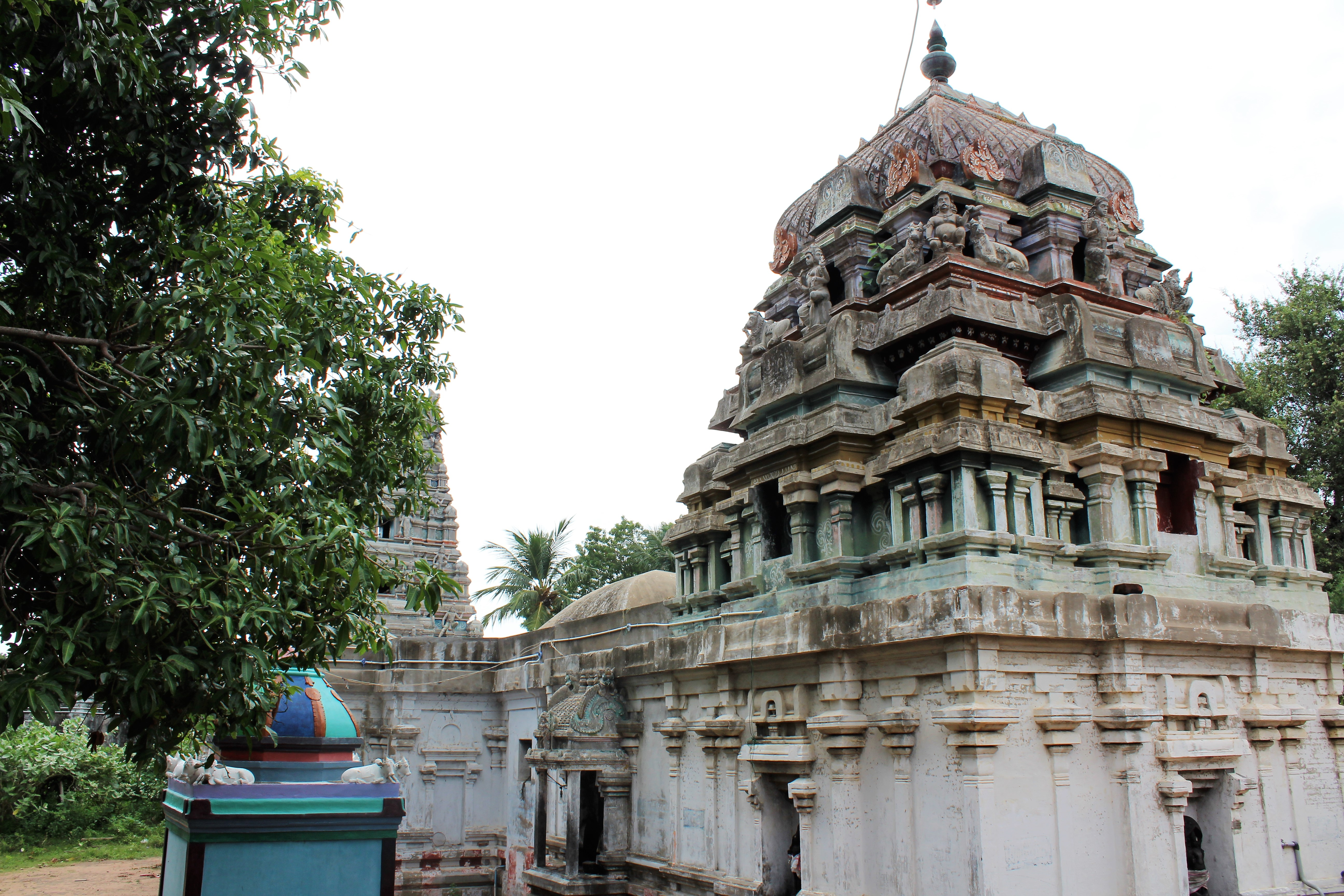
Shrines of the temple

According to legend the Chola king Rajaraja I worshipped Shiva at the site. Afterwards he had a son, Rajendra I, and named the place Rajendirapattinam after the incident. The temple is also said to be the birthplace of Tirunilakanta Yazhpana Nayanar. It is one of the Nava Puliyur Temples mentioned by Patanjali and Vyaghrapada.
