= Sthalasayana Perumal Temple, Tirusirupuliyur =

Hindu temple in Tamil Nadu, India

Sthalasayana Perumal Temple
- Kriba Samudira perumal
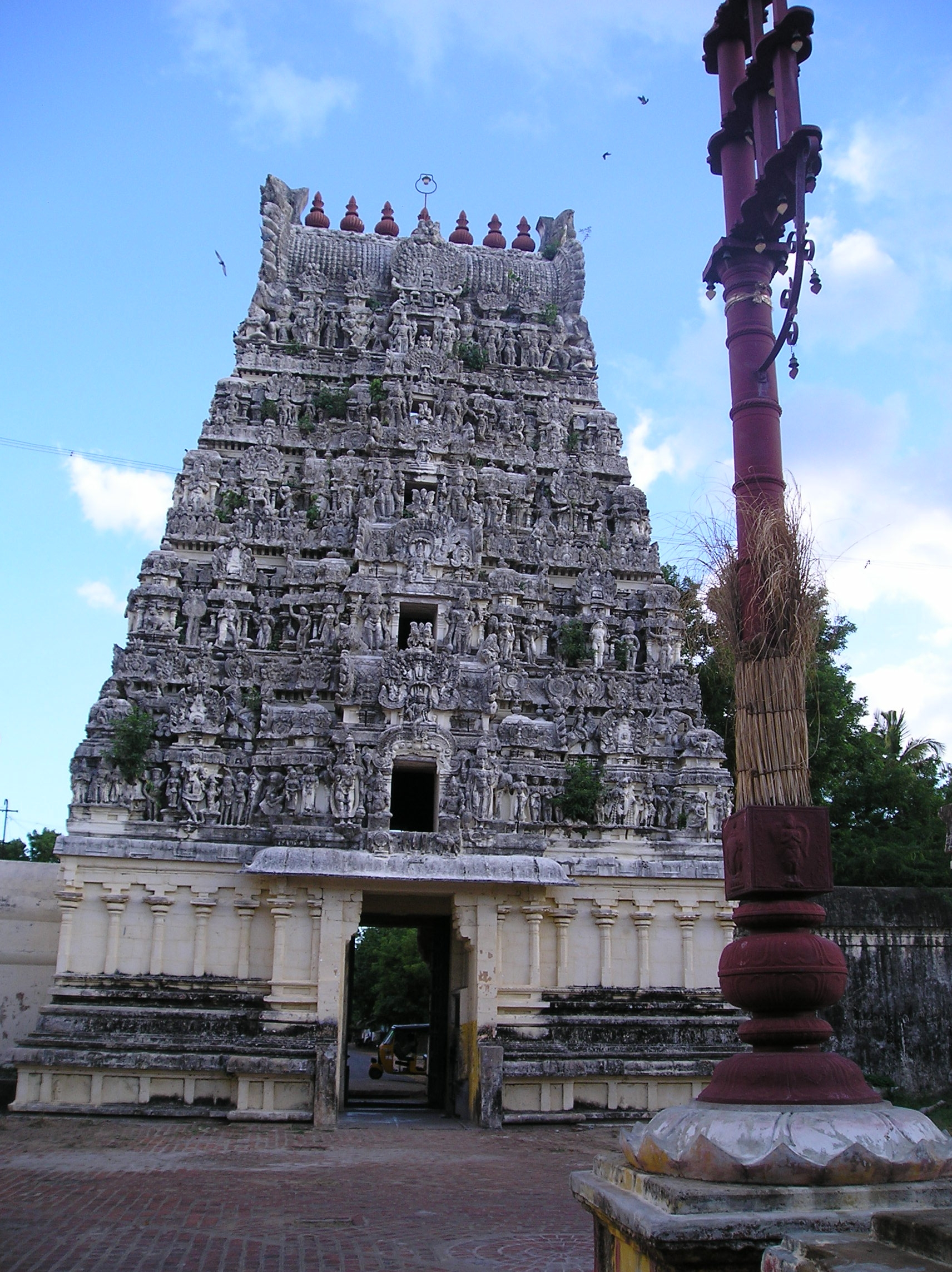

- Location in Tamil Nadu

Religion
- Affiliation: Hinduism
- District: Thiruvarur
- Deity: Sthalasayana Perumal (Vishnu) Thirumaamagal Naachiyar (Lakshmi)
- Features: Tower: Nanda Vardhana Vimanam

Location
- Location: Sirupuliyur
- State: Tamil Nadu
- Country: India
- Coordinates: 10°59′26″N 79°40′10″E

Architecture
- Type: Dravidian architecture
- Direction of façade: Bhujanga Shayanam and South-faced

Sthalasayana Perumal Temple (also called Arulmaakadal Perumal Temple) is a temple of the Hindu god Vishnu near Kollumangudi, Tamil Nadu, India. Constructed in the Dravidian style of architecture, the temple is glorified in the Nalayira Divya Prabandham, the early medieval Tamil canon of the Alvar saints from the 6th–9th centuries CE. It is one of the 108 Divya Desams dedicated to Vishnu, who is worshipped as Sthalasayana Perumal and his consort Lakshmi as Thirumagal Nachiyar. A granite wall surrounds the temple, enclosing all the shrines. There is a four-tiered rajagopuram, the temple's gateway tower, in the temple.

Sthalasayana Perumal is believed to have appeared to sage Vyaghrapada. Three daily rituals and three yearly festivals are held at the temple, of which the Brahmotsavam festival, celebrated during the Tamil month of Vaikasi (May–June), being the most prominent. The temple is maintained and administered by the Hindu Religious and Endowment Board of the Government of Tamil Nadu.

== Legend ==
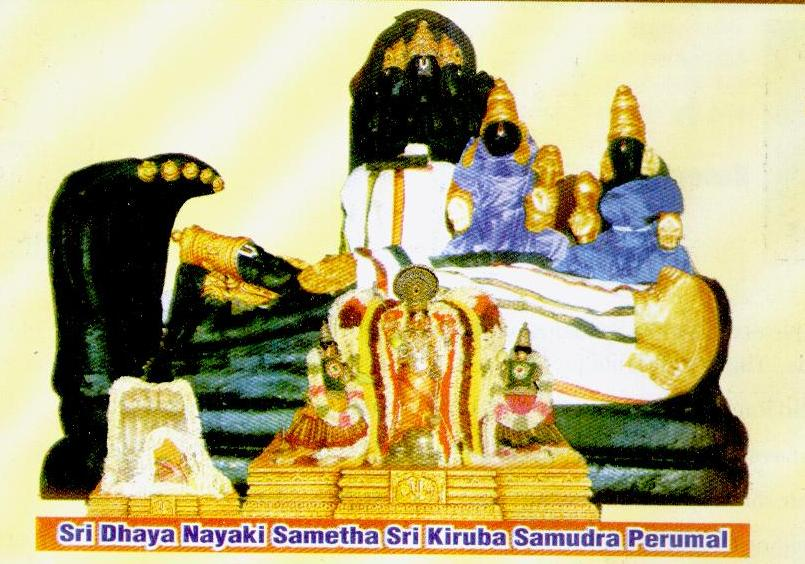
Image of the presiding deity

Shiva ordered the sage Vyaghrapada to perform penance at Srirangam requesting the god Vishnu to give him place in his abode Vaikunta. Vyaghrapada was joined by sage Patanjali in his journey. Because of his poor eyesight, the sages instead went southward, lost their way and reached Krupa Samudram, modern day Tirusirupuliyur. They prayed to Vishnu to come from Srirangam to grant them moksha (divine attainment). Vishnu is believed to have appeared for sage Vyasa also at this place.

It is believed that Vishnu originally offered a darshana (theophany) to the sages as Ranganatha, the form worshipped in the Srirangam temple. Because of their old age, the sages could not see the big image of Vishnu clearly and hence he appeared in a smaller form known as Bala Sayanam (smaller recline), the sleeping posture of a small kid. Being in smaller form, and the saint who worshipped was in the form of a tiger, this place is called Siru (meaning small) Puli (meaning tiger) yur (meaning dwelling place).

== Religious importance ==
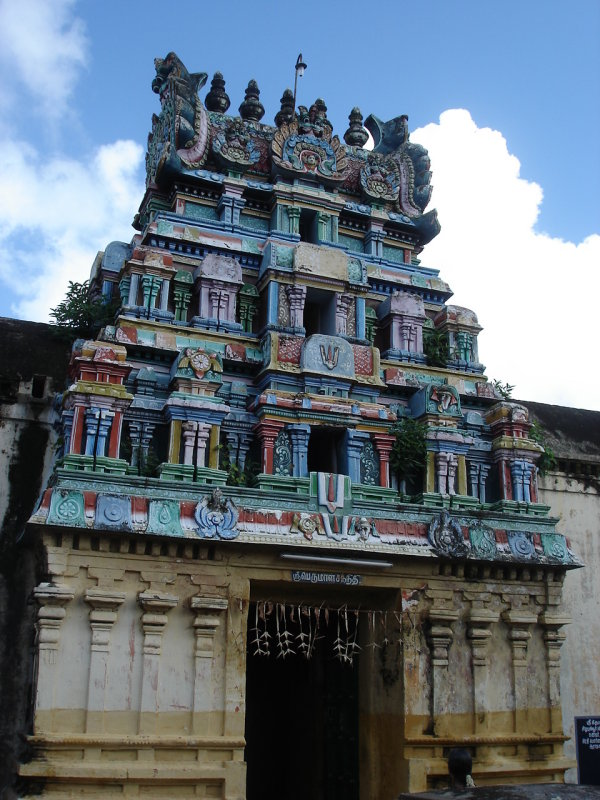
Inner Gopuram

A special feature of this temple is that this is one of the only two Divya Desams where the image of Vishnu is depicted in Sayana Kolam (sleeping posture) facing the Southern direction, the other being Srirangam Ranganathaswamy temple.

It is believed that Garuda, the eagle vehicle of Vishnu, does not fly over this place. Once, Garuda and Adishesha (the snake on whom Vishnu rests in his abode, Vaikuntha) got into an argument as to who was more powerful and devoted to their lord. Finding Garuda a little arrogant, Vishnu went in favour of Adisesha. Worried that Garuda might be angered at this, Adishesha sought the protection of Vishnu, upon which Vishnu asked him to roll himself and hide under him. It is said that as a result of this anger, Garuda never flies over this place. There is another legend that Adishesha won the argument and since snakes were sworn enemies of eagles, Adishesha hid himself under the waters of the temple tank. It is henceforth believed that devotees will be relieved of Naga Dosham (affliction due to serpent god) if one visits this temple. Unmarried people and childless couple can also visit this temple for salvation.

The temple is revered in Nalayira Divya Prabandham, the 7th–9th century Vaishnava canon, by Tirumangai alvar. The Alvar has sung praise on the different forms of Sthalasayana Perumal. The temple is classified as a Divya Desam, one of the 108 Vishnu temples that are mentioned in the book.

== Gallery ==
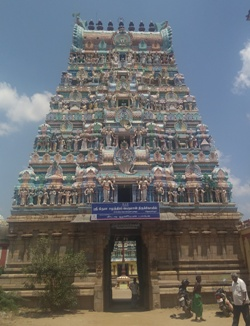
Rajagpoura

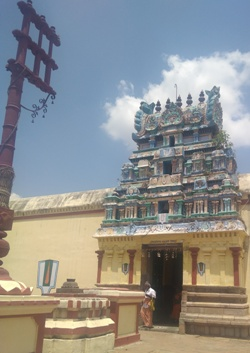
Inner gopura and flagpost

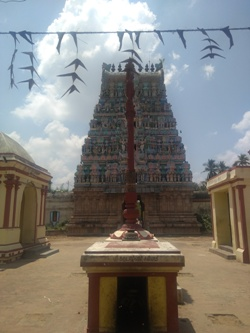
Garudalvar shrine

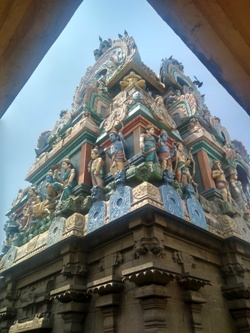
Vimana of presiding deity

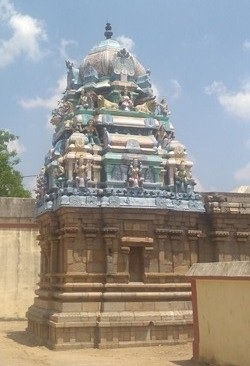
Shrine in prakara

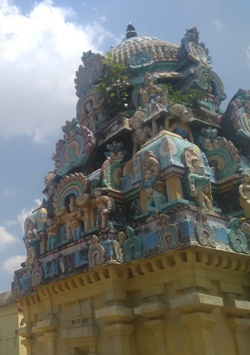
Vimana of Andal
