= Nava Puliyur Temples =

Shiva temples in Tamil Nadu, India

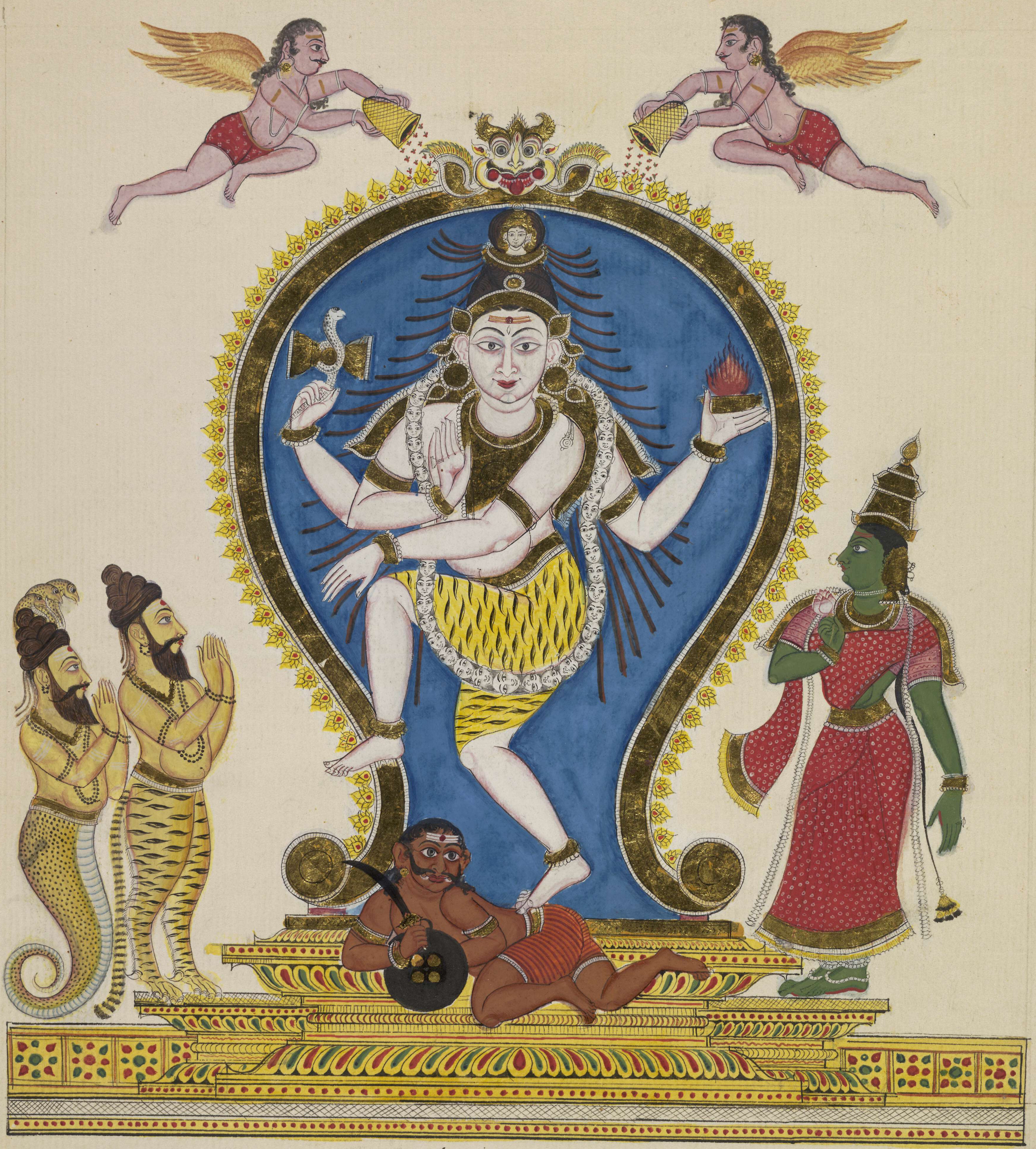
The tiger-footed Vyaghrapada and snake-footed Patanjali salute Nataraja.

Nava Puliyur Temples are the nine Shiva temples in Tamil Nadu, that are connected with Puliyur.

== Origin ==
Patanjali and Vyaghrapada, also known as tiger legged Rishi wanted to see the celestial dance of Shiva. Shiva asked them to come on the day of Thaippusam. As per the advice of the Lord, Vyaghrapada and Patanjali came on that particular day and prayed to Shiva, for getting Moksha.Shiva, in turn, asked them to worship the nine Puliyurs known as 'Nava Puliyur' and complete the journey at Srirangam. The spiritual journey made the devotees to feel that Ranganatha of Srirangam and Nataraja of Chidambaram are two forms of the God. They worshipped the following nine Shiva temples.

=== Perumpatrapuliyur ===
Chidambaram is also known as 'Porpuliyur' and 'Thillai'. Of the Pancha Bhoota Stalam dedicated to Shiva, this refers to the Space. Along with the routine pujas of Nataraja, pujas are held to Patanjali and Vyaghrapada. The puja of Patanjali is known as Vaitheeka and the puja of Vyagrapada is known as Pushpartchana. In this temple there are five sabhas known as Chitsabha, Kanakasabha, Devasabha, Nritta Sabha and Raja Sabha.

=== Thirupathiripuliyur ===
This temple, located at, Cuddalore Puthu Nagar Railway Station, is one of the 275 Paadal Petra Sthalams. As the temple tree is 'Pathiri' and this place was worshipped by Vyaghrapada, this is known as Thirupathiripuliyur. The presiding deity is known as Pataleesvarar and the goddess is known as Periyanayaki.

=== Erukathampuliyur ===
This is also one of the 275 Paadal Petra Sthalams. Also known as Rajendirapattinam, it is on the banks of Vellar. As the temple tree is 'Vellerukkai' and this place was worshipped by Vyaghrapada, this is known as Erukathampuliyur. The presiding deity is known as Neelakandesvarar and the goddess is known as Neelamalarkanni.This is the birthplace of Tiru Nilakanta Yazhpanar. There is a separate shrine for him.

=== Omampuliyur ===
It is one of the shrines of the 275 Paadal Petra Sthalams, located on the north of Cauvery, located at a distance of 30 km. from Chidambaram. The deity, as Dakshinamurti gave the meaning of 'pranava' mantra to Umadevi and this place was worshipped by Vyaghrapada, this is known as Omampuliyur. The murti who gave upadesa, is found as the presiding deity in this temple. In the place of the shrine of Nataraja, Dakshinamurti and in the shrine of Dakshinamurti, Nataraja are found. The presiding deity is known as Pranava Vyaghrapurisvarar and Thuyartheertanathar and the goddess is known as Pushpalathambikai and Poongodinayaki.

=== Sirupuliyur ===
This temple is located at a distance of 20 km from Mayiladuthurai.The presiding deity is known as Margabandeesvarar, Vazhitthunainathar and Gangalanathar. When Patanjali and Vyaghrapada reached the place it became night. Shiva and Ranganatha gave darshan to them. The temple is talked along with the Sthalasayana Perumal Temple, one of the 108 Divyadesam dedicated to Vishnu. Vyaghrapada is seen found worshipping Vishnu under his feet, in sitting posture.

=== Atthippuliyur ===
This is located at a distance of 5 km. from Kilvelur Atthi refers to the elephant. As elephant and Vyaghrapada worshipped here, this place is known as Atthippuliyur.The presiding deity is known as Chidambaresvarar and the goddess is known as Sivakamasundari.This is the place where the scene of celestial wedding was bestowed upon Patanjali, Vyaghrapada and Agastya.

=== Thaplampuliyur ===
This temple is located at a distance of 5 km. from Tiruvarur. Patanjali, Vyaghrapada and Mandooga rishi got the blessings of the deity and saw the divine dance here. The tiger feet and the tiger hand of Vyaghrapada was removed in this place.

=== Perumpuliyur ===
Worshipped by Vyaghrapada this temple is located at a distance of 5 km. from Thiruvaiyaru.The presiding deity is known as Vyakrapureeswarar and the goddess is known as Soundaranayaki.

=== Kanattampuliyur ===
This temple is located south east at a distance of 30 km. from Chidambaram. From Chidambaram and Omampuliyur this place can be reached. The presiding deity is known as Pathanchalinathar and the goddess is known as Kannarkuzhali.Patanjali and Vyaghrapada worshipped the deity of this temple.

== Jeeva samadhi ==
After worshipping the above nine temples, Vyaghrapada and Patanjali came to Srirangam and worshipped the Ranganatha. Later they went to Thiruppattur and worshipped the Brahma and attained Jeeva Samadhi.
