= Vyaghrapada =

Sage in Hinduism

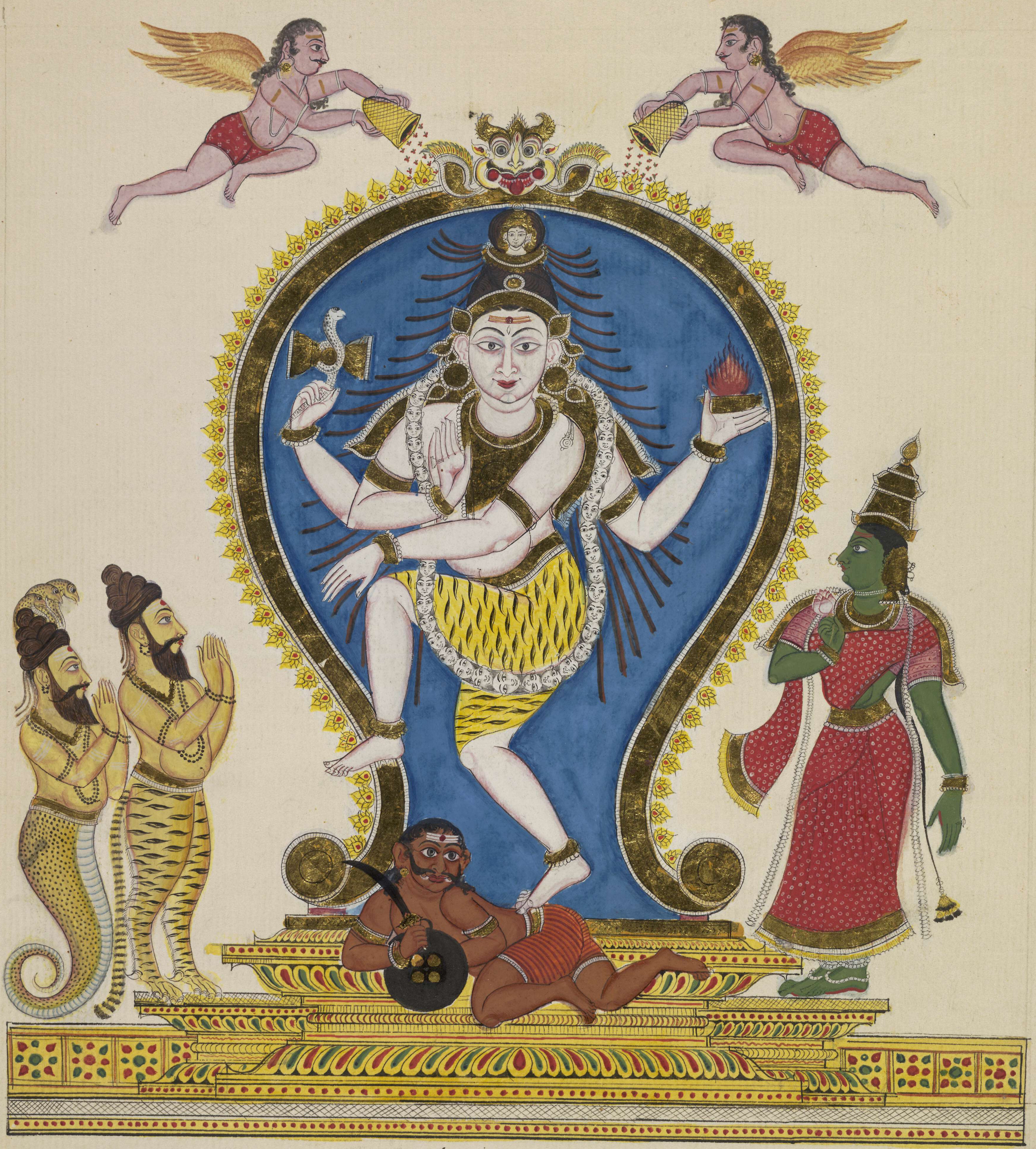
- The tiger-footed Vyaghrapada and snake-footed Patanjali salute Nataraja
- Title: Rishi

Personal life
- Children: Upamanyu
- Parent: Vasishtha (Ancestor)

Religious life
- Religion: Hinduism

Vyaghrapada (Sanskrit: व्याघ्रपाद, romanized: Vyāghrapāda, lit. 'tiger-footed') is a sage featured in Hindu literature.

== Legends ==
According to one legend, Vyaghrapada was entrusted with the task of picking up fresh flowers, untouched even by honeybees, for offering to Shiva in his aspect as Nataraja in the temple complex of Chidambaram, located in the Indian state of Tamil Nadu. While plucking the flowers, Vyaghrapada was wounded on account of thorns and sharp stones. Shiva conferred on him feet of tigers to relieve him of his pain. Now bearing tiger's feet, the sage easily moved from place to place, including climbing rough trees to pluck fresh flowers untouched even by the honeybees. Both the sages Patanjali and Vyaghrapada venerated Shiva, and in response, the deity performed the ananda tandava, his dance of bliss. According to another legend, Sage Vyaghrapada is associated with the king known as Lokeshavikrama, whom he adopts as his son, as described in a sthala purana.

== Other places associated with Vyaghrapada ==
In addition to Chidambaram, there are other places associated with the name of Vyaghrapada. Vyaghrapada is believed to be the founder of the famous Shiva temple at Vaikom in Kottayam district, Kerala. The Sthalasayana Perumal Temple, Tirusirupuliyur in Tamil Nadu, a Vishnu temple, is regarded to have been visited by Vyaghrapada with Patanjali, the sages receiving the darshana of Vishnu in the form of Ranganatha of Srirangam.

== Iconography ==
His image and iconography depicts him as a human being but with the legs of a tiger. He is also shown having a tiger-like tail. Generally, he is shown alongside Patanjali, and both are depicted as offering homage to Shiva in his aspect as Nataraja.

== An astronomical work attributed to Vyaghrapada ==
According to local traditions in Kerala, the authorship of a treatise on astrology called Aṅkaṇaśāstra (also called Grahasamaya and Navagrahasamaya) has been attributed to sage Vyaghrapada. The work consists of 389 verses and has been divided into four chapters. In the book, each of the lagna-rāśi-s has been divided into nine aṅkaṇa-s (navāṃśa-s) and each aṅkaṇa is presided over by a graha having individual characteristics.

== See also ==
- Patanjali
- Bhringi
- Markandeya
- Upamanyu

== Sources ==
- Dictionary of Hindu Lore and Legend (ISBN 0-500-51088-1) by Anna Dallapiccola
