= Shiva temples of Tamil Nadu =

Hindu Shiva temples in south India

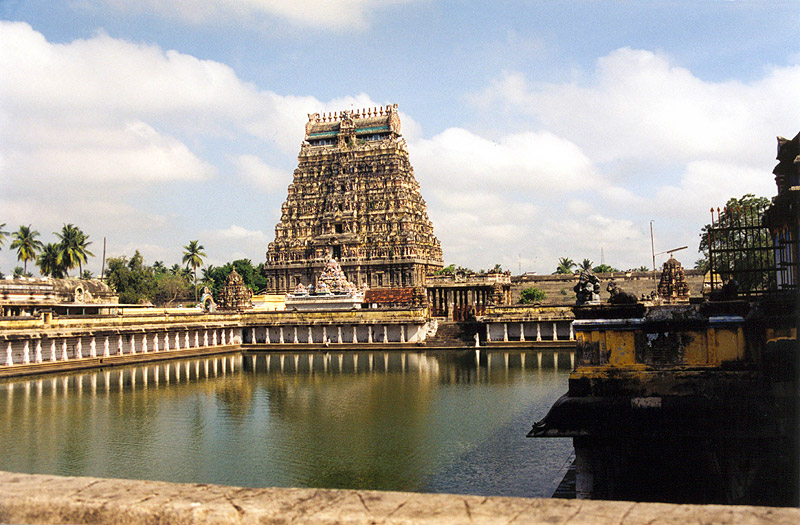
Nataraja Temple, Chidambaram, the foremost Shiva temple in Tamil Nadu

Shiva temples are Hindu temples with shrines of Shiva, one of Hinduism's principal deities. (Note: /ˈməndɪr, -dir/ MUN-dər, -deer; 'd' dental. also mandira /ˈməndɪrə/ MUN-dər-ah) It is estimated that there are over 260 Shiva temples in the Indian state of Tamil Nadu.

== Pancha Bhuta Sthalam ==
The Pancha Bhuta Sthalam are temples which embody the manifestation of the five elements: land, water, air, sky, and fire.

Pancha Bootha Sthalangal
Image	Temple	Element	Location
	Sri Ekambaranathar Temple	Land	Kanchipuram
	Arunachaleshwarar Temple	Fire	Tiruvannamalai
	Jambukeswarar Temple	Water	Tiruchchirappalli
	Thillai Nataraja Temple	Sky	Chidambaram
	Srikalahasti Temple	Air	Kalahasthi, Andhra Pradesh

== Pancha Sabhai ==
Pancha Sabhai are the five temples where Shiva is believed to have performed the Cosmic Dance.

Image	Temple	Aspect	Location
	Sri Vadaranyeswarar Temple	Diamond	Thiruvalangadu
	Chidambaram Temple	Gold	Chidambaram
	Sundareswarar Temple	Silver	Madurai
	Azhagiya koothar Temple	Copper	Chepparai, Tirunelveli
	Kutralanathar Temple	Art	Kutralam

== Paadal Petra Sthalam ==
The Paadal Petra Sthalam temples are revered in the Tamil Tevaram, which includes the works of the seventh- to ninth-century Nalvar poets Thirunavukarasar, Sambandar and Sundarar.

=== Chennai and Tiruvallur ===
Image	Name	Location
	Thiyagaraja Swamy Temple	Thiruvotriyur
	Kapaleeswarar Temple	Thirumayilai
	Marundeeswarar Temple	Thiruvanmiyur
	Tiruvaleeswarar Temple	Thiruvalithaayam
	Masilamaniswarar Temple	Thirumullaivayil
	Vedapureeswarar Temple	Thiruverkadu
	Vaseeswarar Temple	Thirupasoor
	Idaisuranathar Temple	Thiruidaichuram
	Marundeeswarar Temple	Thirukachoor
	Sri Vadaranyeswarar Temple	Thiruvaalangadu
	Undreeshwarar Temple	Thiruvenbakkam
	Arambeswarar Temple	Ilambayam Kottur
	Tripuranthaka Swamy Temple	Thiruvirkolam
	Vedagiriswarar Temple	Thirukazhukundram
	Aksheeswaraswamy Temple	Acharapakkam
	Tirukkandalam Sivanandeswarar Temple	Tirukandalam (Thirukkallil), Tiruvallur

=== Coimbatore ===
Image	Name	Location
	Perur Pateeswarar Temple	Perur
	Arulmigu Manneaswarar Temple	Annur
	Theneeswarar Temple	Vellalore

=== Kancheepuram ===
Image	Name	Location
	Ekambareswarar Temple	Kanchipuram
	Kailasanathar Temple	Kanchipuram
	Maakaraleeswarar Temple	Thirumaagaral
	Valeeswarar Temple	Kuranganilmuttam
	Thalapurishwarar Temple/Kirubanathiswarar Temple	Thiruppanangadu
	Vedapureeswarar Temple	Thiruvothur
	Manikandeswarar Temple	Thirumarperu
	Thiruveeral Temple	Thiruveeral
	Vilwanatheswarar Temple	Tiruvallam

=== Panrutti ===
Image	Name	Location
	Veerattaaneswarar Temple	Thiruvadigai
	Shishta Gurunathar Temple	Thiruthuraiyur

=== Tindivanam ===
Image	Temple	Location
	Chandramouleeswarar Temple	Thiruvakkarai
	Arasileeswarar Temple	Ozhindhiapattu (Thiru Arasili)
	Magakaleswarar Temple	Irumbai (Irumbaimagaalam)
	Nandieswarar Temple	Thiruvaamathur
	Puravaar Panangattoor Temple	Panangattoor (Panayapuram)
	Srinidheeswarar Temple	Annamputhur

=== Thirukkoviloor ===
Image	Temple	Location
	Veerateswarar Temple	Thirukovilur
	Athulya Nadheswara Temple	Arakandanallur (Araiyani Nalloor)
	Marudheeswarar Temple	Idaiyaru
	Sri Krupapureeswarar Temple	Thiruvennainallur

=== Ulundurpettai ===
Image	Name	Location
	Sri Bhakthajaneswarar Temple	Thirunavalur, 15 kilometres (9.3 mi) northeast of Ulundurpet
	Sornakatesvarar Temple	Thiruvennainallur, 15 km northwest of Ulundurpet
	Sivaloganathar Temple	Thirumundeecharam, 24 kilometres (15 mi) northeast of Ulundurpet

=== Chidambaram ===
Image	Temple	Location
	Nataraja	Center of Chidambaram
	Thiruvetkalam	3 kilometres (1.9 mi) east of Chidambaram, on the Annamalai University campus
	Thirunelvayal(Sivapuri)	3 km southeast of Chidambaram, near the Thiruvetkalam temple
	Thirukkazhippalai	5 kilometres (3.1 mi) southeast of Chidambaram

=== Kattumannarkoil ===
Temple	Location
Koodalaiyatroor	28 kilometres (17 mi) north of Kattumannarkoil
Omampuliyur	6 kilometres (3.7 mi) south of Kattumannarkoil, on the north bank of the Kollidam River
Kaanattumullur	5 kilometres (3.1 mi) south of Kattumannarkoil, on the banks of the Kollidam River
Thirunaaraiyur	6 km northeast of Kattumannarkoil, on the north bank of the Kollidam River
Thirukkadamboor	5 km southwest of Kattumannarkoil

=== Sirkazhi - Mayiladuthurai District ===
Image	Temple	Location
	Sattainadhar Temple	Center of Sirkazhi
	Thirukolakka	2 kilometres (1.2 mi) west of Sirkazhi
	Then Thirumullaivayil	12 kilometres (7.5 mi) east of Sirkazhi
	Magendrapalli	19 kilometres (12 mi) northeast of Sirkazhi on the south bank of the Kollidam River, 2 km from the Bay of Bengal
	Thirunalloor Perumaanam (Achaalpuram)	15 kilometres (9.3 mi) north of Sirkazhi, on the south bank of the Kollidam River
	Thirukarugaavoor (Thirukadaavoor)	6 kilometres (3.7 mi) east of Sirkazhi
	Thillaiyadi (Saranaa Ratsagar Temple)	9 kilometres (5.6 mi) east of Sirkazhi
	Kalikaamoor (Annappanpettai)	3 kilometres (1.9 mi) south of the Then Thirumullaivayil temple
	Thiruppunkoor	3 km west of Vaitheeswaran Koil, on the south bank of the Kollidam River
	Thiruvenkadu	10 kilometres (6.2 mi) southeast of Sirkazhi
	Thirukattupalli	0.5 kilometres (0.31 mi) from the Thiruvenkadu temple
	Thiruchaaikkaadu	3 km south of the Thiruvenkadu temple, on the Sirkazhi–Poompuhar road
	Pallavaneecharam	4 kilometres (2.5 mi) south of Thiruvenkadu
	Vaitheeswaran Koil	7 kilometres (4.3 mi) south of Sirkhazi
	Radhanallur	10 km east of Sirkazhi

=== Mayiladuthurai ===
Image	Temple	Location
	Mayuranathaswami Temple	Inside the town
	Iluppaipattu Neelakandeswarar Temple (also known as Pazhamannipadikkarai)	In the madhoogam – vaitheeswaran koil – thirupananthal road, located near a village called Manalmedu
	Sri Rathnapureeswarar Temple - Thiruvazhkoliputhur	10 km north of Mayiladuthurai, near Pazhamannipadikkarai temple above
	Veerateeswarar Temple, Thirupariyalur	13 km east of Mayiladuthurai, near Sembanarkoil
	Semponarkoil Swarnapureeswarar Temple, Thiruchemponpalli, Semponnarkoil	10 km east of Mayiladuthurai, located on south bank of cauvery
	Aakkoor Thanthondreeswarar Temple, Akkur	15 km east of Mayiladuthurai
	Ponsei Natrunaiyappar Temple, Ponsei, Thirunanipalli	6 km northeast of Semponnarkoil and 13 km from Mayiladuthurai
	Veerateeswarar Temple, Korukkai	12 km northwest of Mayiladuthurai, on the north bank of cauvery
	Mahalakshmeeswarar Temple, Tirunindriyur	8 km north east of Mayiladuthurai
	Kurumanakkudi Kannayiram Udayar Temple, Kurumanakkudi	On the vaitheeswaran koil – mayiladuthirai road, 3 km left of a place called Kurumanakkudi
	Kadaimudinathar Temple, Keezhaiyur	2 km northeast of semponar temple
	Kutram Poruttha Naathar Temple, ThiruKaruppariyalur, Thalainayar	14 km north of Mayiladuthurai, on the north bank of cauvery
	Kundaleswarar Temple, Thirukurakka	near Thirukarapariyalur temple, north bank of Pazha Aaru
	Valampurinathar Temple, Thiruvalampuram	8 km northeast of semponar temple
	Sankaranyeswarar Temple, Thalaichangadu	4 km north of Aakkoor, on the south bank of cauvery
	Somanathaswami Temple, Needur, Thiruneedur	5 km north of Mayiladuthurai
	Iyravatheswarar Temple, Mela Thirumanancheri	6 km north of Kuttalam on the north bank of cauvery
	Uthavedeeswarar Temple (kuttalam)	Kuttalam, 10 km southwest of Mayiladuthurai, on the south bank of cauvery
	Udhvaganathar Temple, Thirumanancheri	7 km from kuttalam, on the north bank of cauvery - www.thirumanancheri.info
	Kalyanasundareswarar Temple, Thiruvelvikkudi, Kuthalam	5 km northeast of kuttalam
	Veerateeswarar Temple, Vazhuvur	7 km south-west of Mayiladuthurai, Tamil Nadu, India
	Amritaghateswarar-Abirami Temple, Thirukkadaiyur	21 km East of Mayiladuthurai
	Masilamaniswara Temple, Thiruvaduthurai	16 km southwest of Mayiladuthurai on the cauvery south bank
	Uma Maheswarar Temple, Konerirajapuram (Thirunallam)	6 km south of thiruvaavaduthurai above, on the cauvery south bank
	Vaigalnathar Temple, Thiruvaigal, Mayiladuthurai	4 km northwest of Koneri Rajapuram, on the cauvery south bank
	Uchiravaneswarar Temple, Tiruvila Nagar in Mayiladuthurai	7 km east of Mayiladuthurai, on the south bank of cauvery
	Vedapureeswarar Temple, Thiruvazhundhoor(Therazhundoor)	4 km south of kuttalam, near moovalur temple, south bank of cauvery
	Abathsahayeswarar Temple, Thiru Anniyoor (ponnoor)	7 km northwest of Mayiladuthurai, north bank of cauvery
	Brahmapureeswarar Temple, Tirumayanam (ThiruKadavur Mayanam)	1 km east of Thirukkadaiyoor temple above

=== Kumbakonam ===
Image	Temple	Location
	Adi Kumbeswarar Temple	Kumbakonam
	Nageswaraswamy Temple	East of the Kumbakonam bus stand
	Kasi Viswanathar Temple	Near Porthamarai Kulam in Kumbakonam
	Thirunageswaram	5 kilometres (3.1 mi) east of Kumbakonam, on the south bank of the Kaveri
	Amirthakadeswarar Temple	5 km southeast of Kumbakonam in Sakkottai, on the south bank of the Kaveri
	Sivagurunathaswamy Temple	2 km northeast of Sakkottai, on the south bank of the Arasalaar
	Tirunarayur Siddhanatheswarar Temple	10 km southeast of Kumbakonam, adjacent to Nachiyar Koil, on the south bank of the Kaveri
	Thirukarukkudi (marudhanthanalloor)	8 km southeast of Kumbakonam, on the south bank of the Kaveri
	Sivanandeswarar Temple	3 km northeast of Nachiyar Koil/Tirunarayur Siddhanatheswarar Temple, on the south bank of the Kaveri
	Padikasu Nathar Temple	3 km northwest of Nachiyar Koil/Tirunarayur Siddhanatheswarar Temple, on the south bank of the Kaveri
	Tirucherai Gnanaparameswarar Temple	5 km south of Nachiyar Koil, 15 km southeast of Kumbakonam, on the south bank of the Kaveri
	Koneswarar Temple	15 km from Kumbakonam, on the south bank of the Kaveri
	Tirukkollampudur Vilvaranyeswarar Temple	6 km southwest of Kudavasal, on the south bank of the Kaveri
	Kottaiyur Kodeeswarar Temple	2 km northwest of Kumbakonam, on the north bank of the Kaveri
	Innambur Ezhutharinathar Temple	6 km northwest of Kumbakonam, on the north bank of the Kaveri
	Sakshinatheswarar Temple	9 km northwest of Kumbakonam, 3 km from Innambur Ezhutharinathar Temple, on the north bank of the Kaveri
	Kabartheeswarar Temple	4 km west of Kumbakonam, on the south bank of the Kaveri
	Thenupuriswarar Temple	6 km southwest of Kumbakonam, on the south bank of the Kaveri
	Sakthivanesvara Temple	Next to Thenupuriswarar Temple, on the south bank of the Kaveri
	Pazhayarai Vadathali	2 km from Thenupuriswarar Temple, on the south bank of the Kaveri
	Thenkurangaduthurai Temple	In Aduthurai, 14 km from Kumbakonam

=== Papanasam ===
Image	Temple	Location
	Palaivananathar Temple	1 km northeast of the Papanasam railway station, on the south bank of the Kaveri
	Tiruvaikavur Temple	12 km north of Papanasam, on the south bank of the Kollidam River
	Vijayamangai Vijayanatheswarar Temple	1 km east of the Tiruvaikavur Temple, on the north bank of the Kaveri
	Dayanidheeswarar Temple	4 km north of Papanasam, on the north bank of the Kaveri
	Garbharakshambigai Temple	6 km south of Papanasam, on the south bank of the Kaveri
	[Kalyanasundaresar Temple	5 km east of Papanasam, on the south bank of the Kaveri
	Pasupatheeswarar Temple	12 km southeast of Papanasam, on the south bank of the Kaveri
	Chakravageswarar Temple	10 km west of Papanasam, on the south bank of the Kaveri
	Alandurainathar Temple, Pullamangai	3 km from the Pasupathikoil railway station (Kumbakonam-Thanjavur line), on the south bank of the Kaveri
	Andarkoil Swarnapureewarar Temple	18 km southeast of Papanasam, on the Kudavasal-Valangaimaan bus route and the south bank of the Kaveri
	Thiru Irumboolai, Aalangudi	6 km south of Valangaimaan, on the south bank of the Kaveri

=== Karaikal ===
Image	Temple	Location
	Tirunallar Dharbaranyeswarar Temple	5 km west of Karaikal, on the Kumbakonam road and the south bank of the Kaveri
	Dharumapuram Yazhmoorinathar Temple	2 km on the Thirunallaru–Karaikal road, on the south bank of the Kaveri
	Tiruvettakkudi Sundareshwarar Temple	Near Karaikal, on the south bank of the Kaveri
	Tiruttelicheri Parvatheeswarar Temple	In Kovilpathu, on the south bank of the Kaveri

=== Mannargudi ===
Image	Temple	Location
	Vennikarumbeeswarar Temple, Thiruvenniyur, Kovilvenni	8 km northwest of Needamangalam on the Tanjore-Tiruvarur road, south bank of the Kaveri
	Parijatha Vaneswarar Temple, Thirukalar	23 km southeast of Manargudi on the Thiruthuraipoondi road, south bank of the Kaveri
	Chathuranga vallapanathar Temple, Thirupoovanur	8 km north of Mannargudi on the Needamangalam road, south bank of the Kaveri
	Kozhuntheesar Temple, Kottur	15 km southeast of Mannargudi, south bank of the Kaveri
	Thiruppaereyil, Ogaiperaiyur	16 km northeast of Mannargudi, south bank of the Kaveri
	Nellivana Nathar, Thirunellikaval	23 km east of Mannargudi, south bank of the Kaveri
	Manikkavannar Temple, Thirunaattiyathankudi	10 km northeast of Mannargudi, 12 km southeast of Koothanallur, south bank of the Kaveri
	Agneeswarar Temple, Thirukollikadu	19 km from Mannargudi
	Sri Ramanatha Swamy Temple, Thirurameshwaram	11 km from Mannargudi, on the Thiruthuraipoondi road
	Vendurainathar Temple, Thiruvanduthurai	10 km east of Mannargudi, south bank of the Kaveri
	Thiruneelakanteswarar Temple	1 km east of Rajagopalaswamy Temple, Mannargudi, south bank of the Kaveri
	Annamalai Nathar Temple, Mannargudi	2 km west of Rajagopalaswamy Temple, south bank of the Kaveri
	Kailasa Nathar Temple	1.5 km east of Rajagopalaswamy Temple, south bank of the Kaveri
	Meenakshi Sokkanathar Temple	4 km southeast of Rajagopalaswamy Temple, south bank of the Kaveri
	Jayamkonda Nathar Temple	2 km northeast of Rajagopalaswamy Temple, south bank of the Kaveri
	Kasivishwa Nathar Temple	2 km northeast of Rajagopalaswamy Temple, south bank of the Kaveri
	Kasivishwa Nathar Temple	1 km north of Rajagopalaswamy Temple, south bank of the Kaveri
	Kamakshi Samedha Ekambareswarar Temple	1 km east of Rajagopalaswamy Temple, south bank of the Kaveri
	Pamani Naganathar Temple	2 km north of Mannargudi, south bank of the Kaveri, north bank of the Pamaniyar River

=== Thiruthuraipoondi ===
Image	Temple	Location
	Thandalai Neelneri	3 km north of Thiruthuraipoondi on the Tiruvarur road, south bank of the Kaveri
	Kaichinnam	11 km north of Thiruthuraipoondi, south bank of the Kaveri
	Thiruthengoor	16 km north of Thiruthuraipoondi, 2 km from Thirunellikkaa, south bank of the Kaveri
	Thirukkollikkadu	15 km north of Thiruthuraipoondi, south bank of the Kaveri
	Thiruchitremam	14 km northeast of Thiruthuraipoondi, south bank of the Kaveri
	Idumbaavanam	12 km south of Thiruthuraipoondi, south bank of the Kaveri; 2 km west of Karpaganadharkulam (below)
	Thirukkadikulam, Karpaganadharkulam, Karpaganarkoil	2 km east of Idumbavanam temple, south bank of the Kaveri
	Thiruvuchaathanam, Koviloor	2 km north of Muthupettai, southwest of Thiruthuraipoondi, south bank of the Kaveri

=== Nagapattinam ===
Temple	Location
Thirunaagaikaaronam	In Nagapattinam, south bank of the Kaveri
Sikkal	5 km west of Nagapattinam, south bank of the Kaveri
Vyagrapureeswarar Temple	7 km west of Nagapattinam, 3 km from Sikkal
Brahmapureeswarar Temple	In Thirukkuvalai, 25 km southwest of Nagapattinam, 19 km from Tiruvarur
Tiruvaimoor	3 km south of Thirukkuvalai, south bank of the Kaveri
Vedaranyeswarar Temple	In Vedaranyam, south of Nagapattinam and the Kaveri
Agathiyanpalli	2 km south of Vedaranyam on the Kodikkarai road
Kodi Kuzhagar Temple	In Point Calimere, 9 km south of Thirumaraikkadu

=== Namakkal ===
Temple	Location
Ardhanareeswarar Temple	Tiruchengode
Sri Asala Deepeshwarar Temple	Mohanur

=== Thanjavur ===
Image	Temple	Location
	Vedapuriswarar Temple	7 km north of Thanjavur, 1 km from Thirukkandiyur; Kaveri south bank
	Vasishteswarar Temple	In Thittai, 10 km north of Thanjavur; Kaveri south bank
	Paridiniyamam Parithiappar Temple	18 km southeast of Thanjavur, 4 km north of Orathanad; Kaveri south bank
	Aradhaiperumpaazhi, Arithuvaramangalam	Accessible by the Thanjavur bus; Kaveri south bank
	Avalivanallur Satchinathar Temple	3 km west of Aradhaiperumpaazhi; Kaveri south bank
	Akshayapureeswarar Temple	In Vilankulam, 18 km from Peravurani
	Brihadisvara Temple	1 km from old bus stand, 1 km from Thanjavur palace

=== Tiruchirappalli ===
Image	Temple	Location
	Rockfort temple	In the center of Tiruchirappalli, on the south bank of the Kaveri
	Panchavarnaswamy Temple	Urayur
	Jambukeswarar Temple	In Thiruvanaikaval, 3 km north of Tiruchirappalli
	Erumbeeswarar Temple	In Thiruverumbur, 11 km east of Tiruchirapalli on the Thanjavur road

=== Madurai ===
Image	Temple	Location
	Meenakshi Temple	Madurai city center
	Thiru Aappanoor	About 2 km from the city center, on the north bank of the Vaigai River
	Subramaniya Swamy Temple	9 km southwest of Madurai, one of the Six Abodes of Murugan
	Edaganathar temple	In Thiruvedagam, 17 km northwest of Madurai
	Piranmalai Kodunkundreeswar Temple	24 km northwest of Thiruputhur
	Poovananathar Temple Thirupuvanam	19 km east of Madurai, on the Vaigai River
	Adhi Ratneswarar Temple	Tiruvadanai
	Thirumeninathar temple	In Tiruchuli, 48 km south of Madurai
	Kalaiyar Kovil	18 km east of Sivaganga
	Tiruttalinathar Temple	In Thiruputhur, 20 km west of Karaikkudi
	Thiruppunavayil	25 km south of Thiru Aappanoor
	Shree Kailasha Nathar Temple	In Piramanoor, 23 km east of Madurai

=== Dindigul ===
The Lord Malligarjuna Swamy Temple is in Kondarangi Keeranur, Dindigul district.

=== Tirunelveli ===
Image	Temple	Location
	Nellaiappar Temple	Tirunelveli
	Thirukutralam	Kutralam
	Sankaranayinarkoil	Sankarankovil
	Kasi Viswanathar Temple	Tenkasi
	Papanasanathar Temple	In Papanasam, 49 km from Tirunelveli
	Sivasailam Temple	In Sivasailam, 60 km from Tirunelveli

=== Tiruvannamalai ===
Image	Temple	Location
	Arunachalesvara Temple	In Tiruvannamalai, 64 km west of Tindivanam
	Agastheesvarar Temple	In Purisai, between Cheyyar and Vandavasi

=== Rameswaram ===
Image	Temple	Location
	Ramanathaswamy Temple	Rameswaram

== Nava Kailasam temples ==
These nine Shiva temples are on the Thamirabarani River near Tirunelveli:

- Papanasam
- Cheran Mahadevi
- Kodaganallur
- Kunnathur, Tirunelveli
- Murappanadu
- Srivaikuntam
- Thenthiruperai
- Rajapathy
- Senthamangalam, Tuticorin
