= Koneswarar Temple, Kudavasal =

Shiva temple in Tamil Nadu, India

Koneswarar
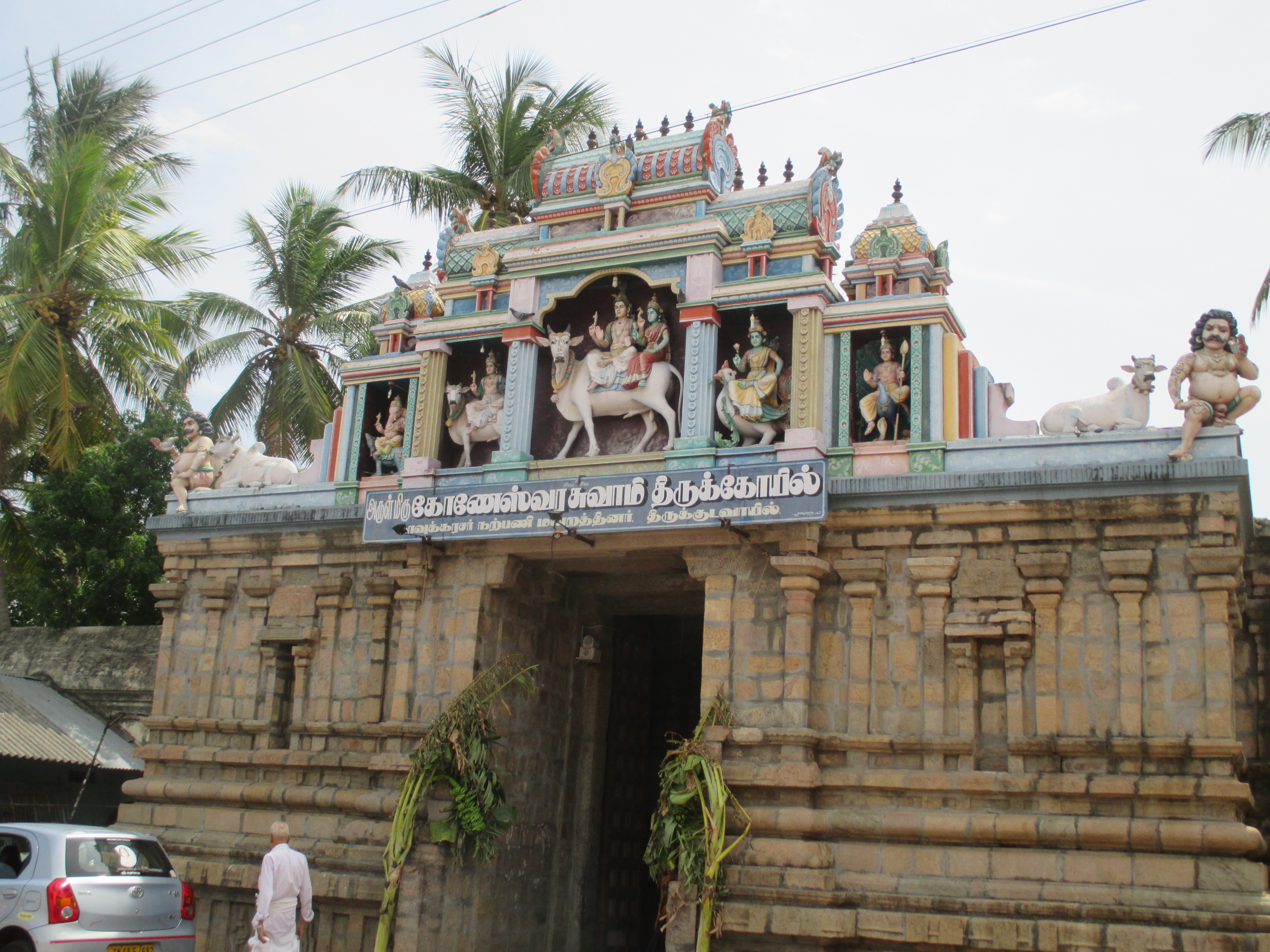

- Location in Tamil Nadu

Religion
- Affiliation: Hinduism
- District: Thiruvarur
- Deity: Koneswarar (Shiva), Periyanayagi(Parvathi)

Location
- Location: Kumbakonam
- State: Tamil Nadu
- Country: India
- Coordinates: 10°51′29″N 79°28′56″E

Architecture
- Type: Dravidian architecture

Koneswarar Temple (Tamil: குடவாசல் கோணேசுவரர் கோயில்) is a Hindu temple in the town of Kudavasal in the Tiruvarur district of Tamil Nadu, India. The presiding deity is Shiva.

Koneswarar Temple is situated at Tirukudavayil in Thanjavur District. Build before 660 AD The temple is dedicated to Lord Shiva. This maadakkovil was built by Ko Chenkann Cholan at an elevation. The principal deity is in the form of Koneswarar along with Goddess Periyanayagi. The temple contains an 80 feet tall Rajagopuram and two prakarams. The temple teertham is Amirtatheertham. Saint Sambandar has contributed pathigams praising the lord. Arudra Darisanam and Maasi Magam are celebrated in a grand manner. The temple can be approached from Koradacherri railway station which is 10 km away.

== Legend ==
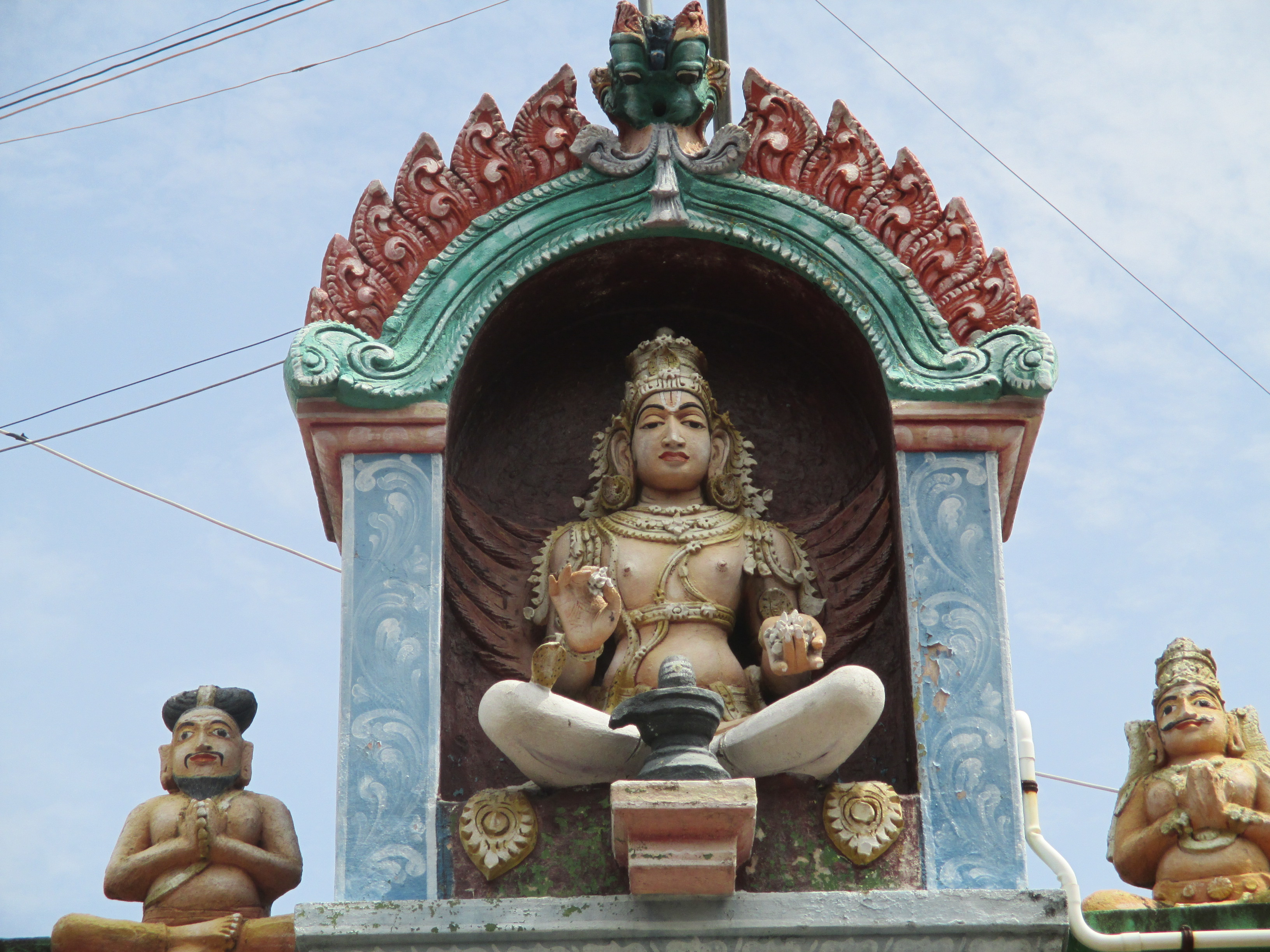
Image of legend of Garuda worshiping Shiva

As per Hindu legend, during the great deluge, the top of the mythical pot (kumbha) of the Hindu god Brahma that contained the seed of all living beings on earth fell at this place. The kumbha is believed to have been displaced by a pralaya (dissolution of the universe) and ultimately came to rest at the spot where the town of Kumbakonam now stands.

As per another legend, Garuda, the eagle of Hindu god Vishnu worshipped Shiva at this place. The mother of Garuda, Vinatha, was a slave of a demon king named Kathru. Garuda wanted to rescue his mother from the demon and he brought a pot of nectar from the abode of Brahma. A demon snatched the pot from Garuda and placed it on an ant hill. Garuda defeated the demon in a battle that followed and while trying to rescue the pot, he found that it was covered by the anthill. He dug the anthill with his beak and found a Linga under the anthill. He prayed to Shiva, explaining his venture; Shiva was pleased and helped Garuda rescue his mom from the clutches. The scar on the image of the Shiva in the form of Lingam is believed to have been caused by Garuda.

== Maadakoil ==
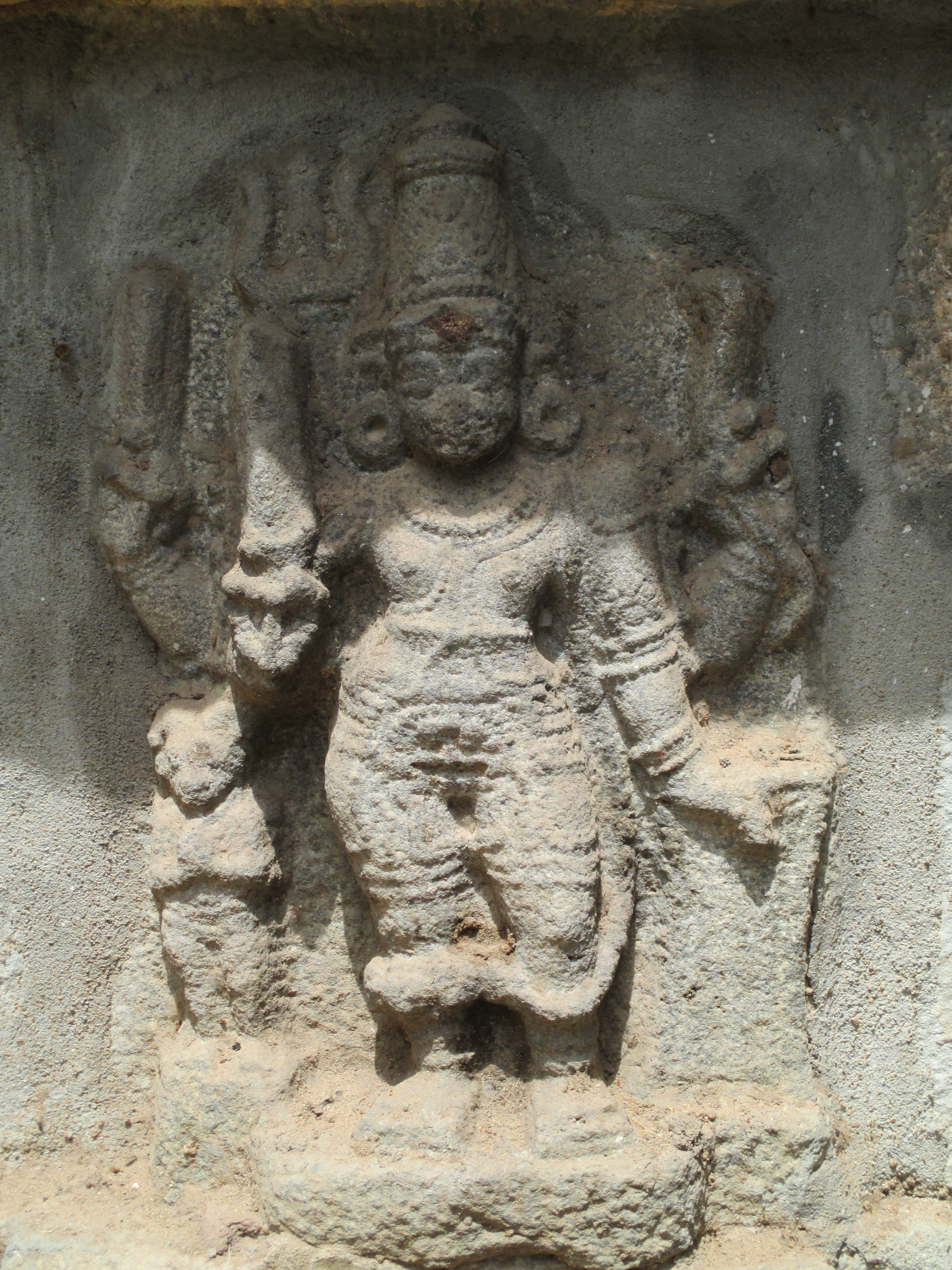
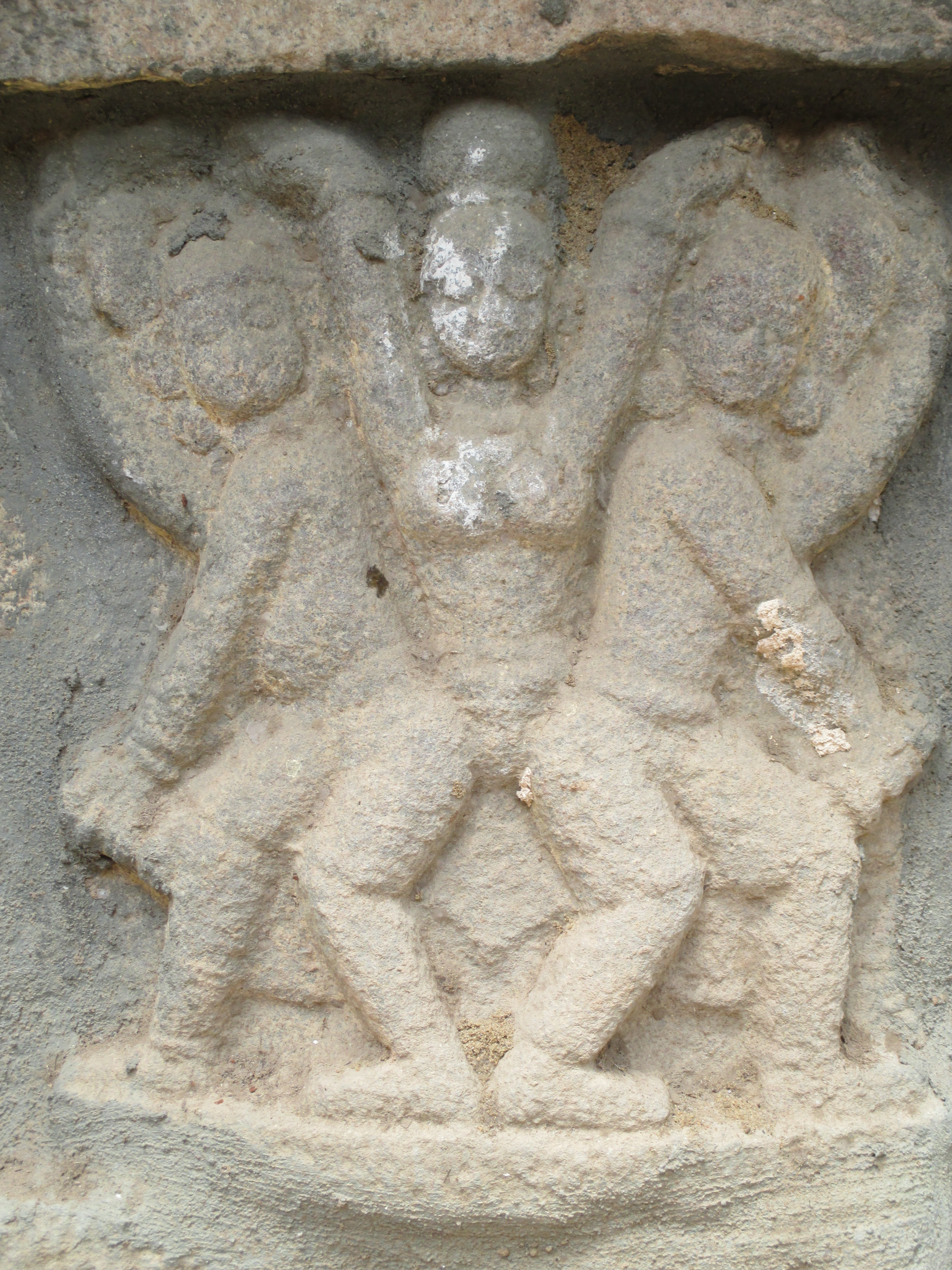
Halls in the temple with sculpted pillars

Kochengat Chola was a Chola king and one of the 63 nayanmars (saivite saints) of saivism. He is believed to have attained spiritual rebirth of a spider that fought with an elephant in its previous birth over the worship of the Hindu god Shiva. He had red eyes during birth as he remained in his mother's womb a little longer. His mother, looking into the babies red eyes said Kochengkannano (in Tamil ko=king, cheng=red, kan=eyes), which literally means king with red eyes and hence he was named Kochengat Cholan. After becoming a king, he followed saivism and built seventy Maadakovils, temples with elevated structure where elephants cannot reach the sanctum, in the Chola empire. The temple is counted as one of the seventy temples built by him.

== Religious Significance ==
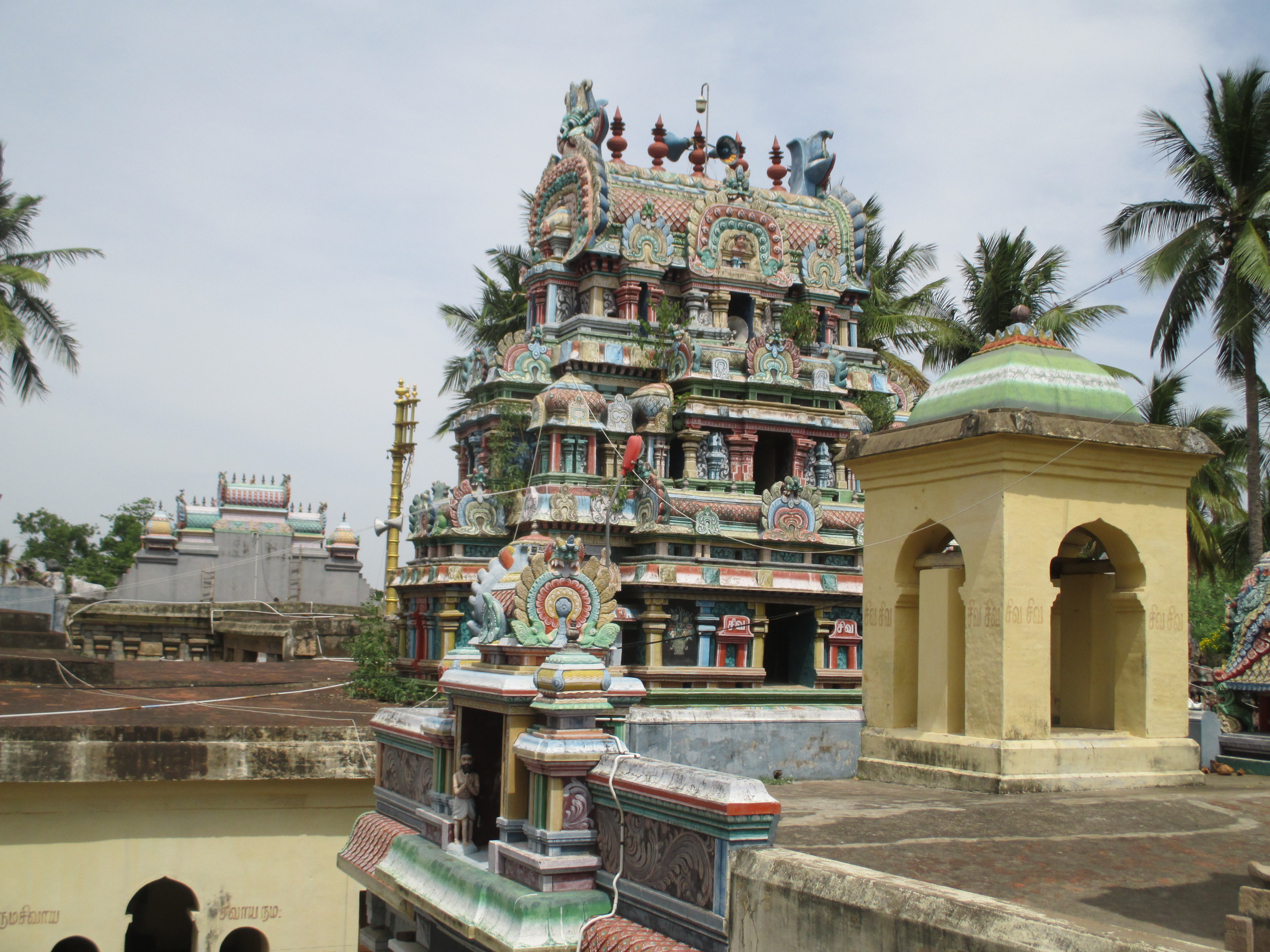
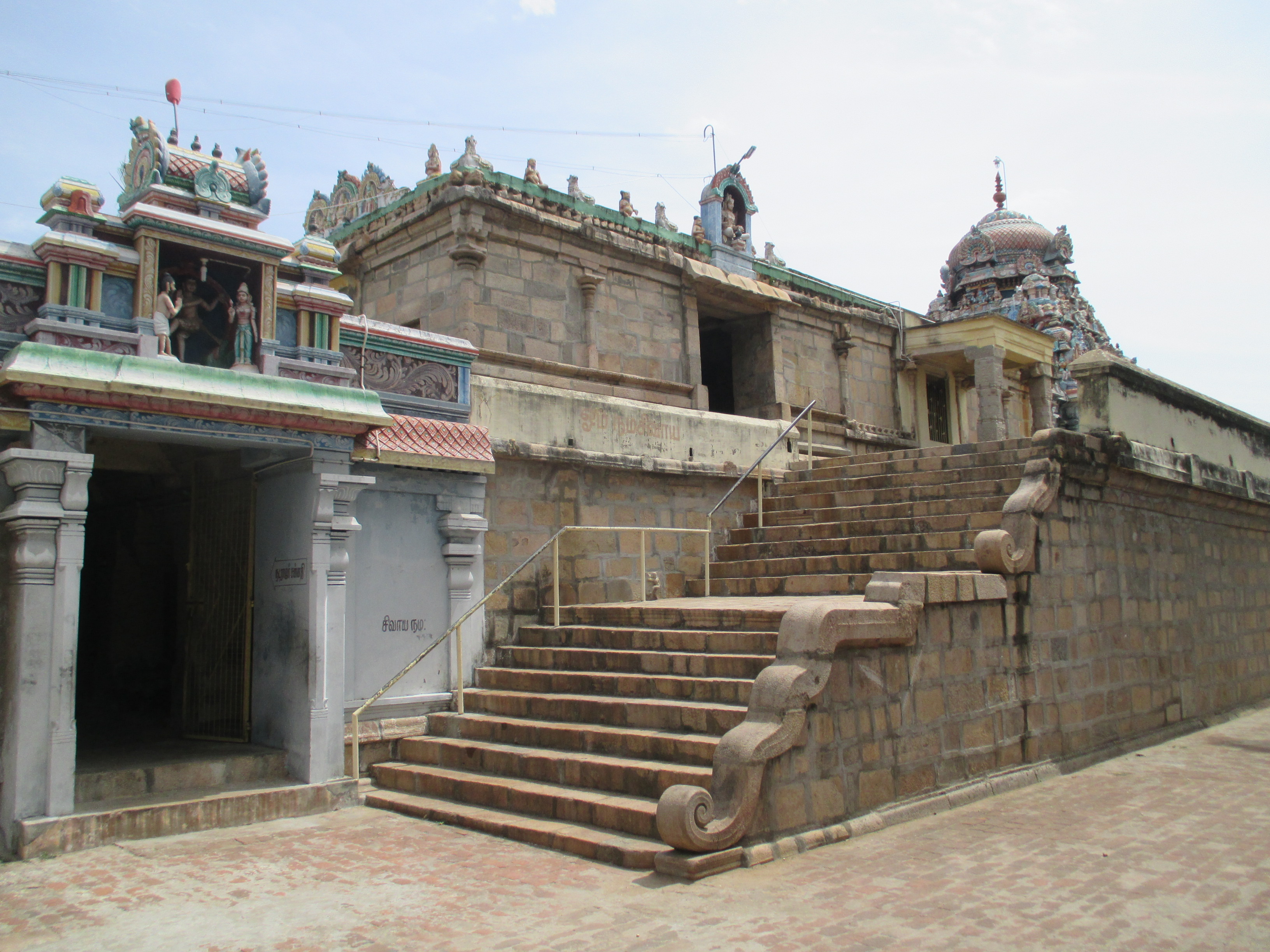
Halls in the temple with sculpted pillars

The Saivite saints, Sambandar and Arunagirinathar have sung praises of the temple. According to Hindu mythology, during pralaya, Shiva carried the four Vedas in the form of nectar in a pot which was eventually destroyed. The mouth of the pot fell at the spot where the temple has been constructed.

== Paadal Petra Sthalam ==
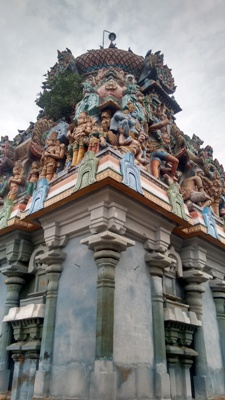
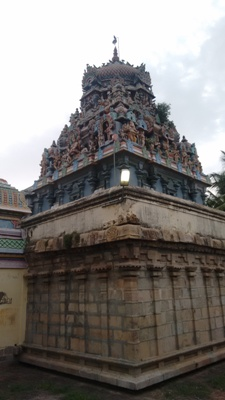
View of the vimana from the first prakara and rear of the sanctum sanctorum

It is one of the shrines of the 275 Paadal Petra Sthalams - Shiva Sthalams glorified in the early medieval Tevaram poems by Tamil Saivite Nayanar Tirugnanasambandar.

== Shrines ==
There are shrines to Murugan, Idumban, Shiva, Sundarar, Saraswati, Surya and Chandra.
