= Agastheesvarar Temple, Kuzhaiyur =

Shiva temple in Nagapattinam district, Tamil Nadu, India

Agastheesvarar Temple
- Agastheesvarar Temple, Kullhaiyur, Mayiladuthurai district, Tamil Nadu

Religion
- Affiliation: Hinduism
- District: Mayiladuthurai
- Deity: Agastheesvarar

Location
- Location: Kullhaiyur
- State: Tamil Nadu
- Country: India
- Coordinates: 11.018984°N 79.591194°E

Specifications
- Temple: One
- Elevation: 38.08 m (125 ft)

Agastheesvarar Temple is a Hindu temple dedicated to the deity Shiva, located at Kuzhaiyur village near Kuthalam in Mayiladuthurai district in Tamil Nadu, India. The temple was constructed in stone by Sembiyan Mahadevi, the mother of Uttama Chola, during the latter's 10th regnal year.

== History ==
An inscription on the temple walls, records that Sembiyan Mahadevi constructed the temple in stone. It also provides details of the number and extent of the devadana lands belonging to the temple.

The temple is referred to as Tirukkarrali-Mahadevar in another inscription of a later king bearing the title Konerimaikondan (No. 73 of 1926). An inscription recording a gift of a lamp to the temple mentions a Parakesarivarman without a distinguishing epithet, possibly referring to Uttama Chola. The temple may therefore have been constructed during or before the tenth regnal year of Uttama Chola. Further endowments were made during the reigns of Rajaraja Chola I and Vikrama Chola.

== Vaippu Sthalam ==
It is one of the shrines of the Vaippu Sthalams sung by Tamil Saivite Nayanar Appar.

== Presiding deity ==
The presiding deity in the garbhagriha is represented by the lingam known as Agastheesvarar. The Goddess is known as Abirami.

== Significance ==
When Agastya came to Therazhundur in order to come out from the curse of destroying Vilvalan Vadhabi, he also came to this temple. When the celestial wedding of Lord Shiva took place at Kailash, all the people went there. At that time the north of earth came down and the south went up. In order to make it in order Shiva asked Agastya to go to South. On the advice of the Lord Agastya came to south. During his journey, he halted in this temple and worshipped the deity. As Agastya worshipped this place, it was known as Kuzhaiyur.

== Architecture ==
The temple has no gopuram. An entrance with compound wall is found. The temple consists of a garbhagriha (sanctum) and an ardhamandapa. The walls of the garbhagriha contain the following devakoshta sculptures Dakshinamurti in south, Lingodbhavar in west, and Brahma in north. The ardhamandapa features Nataraja, Agastyar and Ganesha on its southern wall, and Bhikshatanar, Durga and Ardhanarisvarar on its northern wall. Two dvarapalas are positioned in front of the ardhamandapa.

Near to it the shrine of the presiding deity found, facing east. In front of the deity Nandhi and balipeeta are found. In the west prakara along with two Vinayakas, Agasthia is found. Shrines of Subramania with his consorts Valli and Deivanai, Kasi Visvanatha with Visalakshi and Bairava are found. Shrine of Vishnu known as Varadharaja Perumal Temple is also found in the right side. Kumbhabhishekham of this temple was held in July 2009.

== Location ==
The temple is located 10 km from Kuthalam and 13 km from Mayiladthurai. In Mayiladuthurai-Komal route at Perattakudi this temple is found. In Kumbakonam-Porayar road, through Komal, Perattakudi can be reached. The temple is very near to that place. This is opened for devotees from 10.00 am -11.00 am and 5.00 to 6.30 pm.
