= Vedapureeswarar Temple =

Vedapureeswarar Temple may refer to:

- Vedapureeswarar Temple, Cheyyar, a temple in Cheyyar, Tiruvannamalai district, Tamil Nadu, India
- Vedapureeswarar Temple, Puducherry, a temple in Puducherry, India
- Vedapureeswarar Temple, Therazhundur, a temple in Therazhundur, Nagapattinam district, Tamil Nadu, India
- Vedapureeswarar Temple, Thiruverkadu, a temple in Thiruverkadu, Tiruvallur district, Tamil Nadu, India
- Vedapuriswarar Temple, Thiruvedhikudi, a temple in Thiruvedikudi, Thanjavur district, Tamil Nadu, India
