= Iluppaipattu Neelakandeswarar Temple =

Shiva temple in Tamil Nadu, India

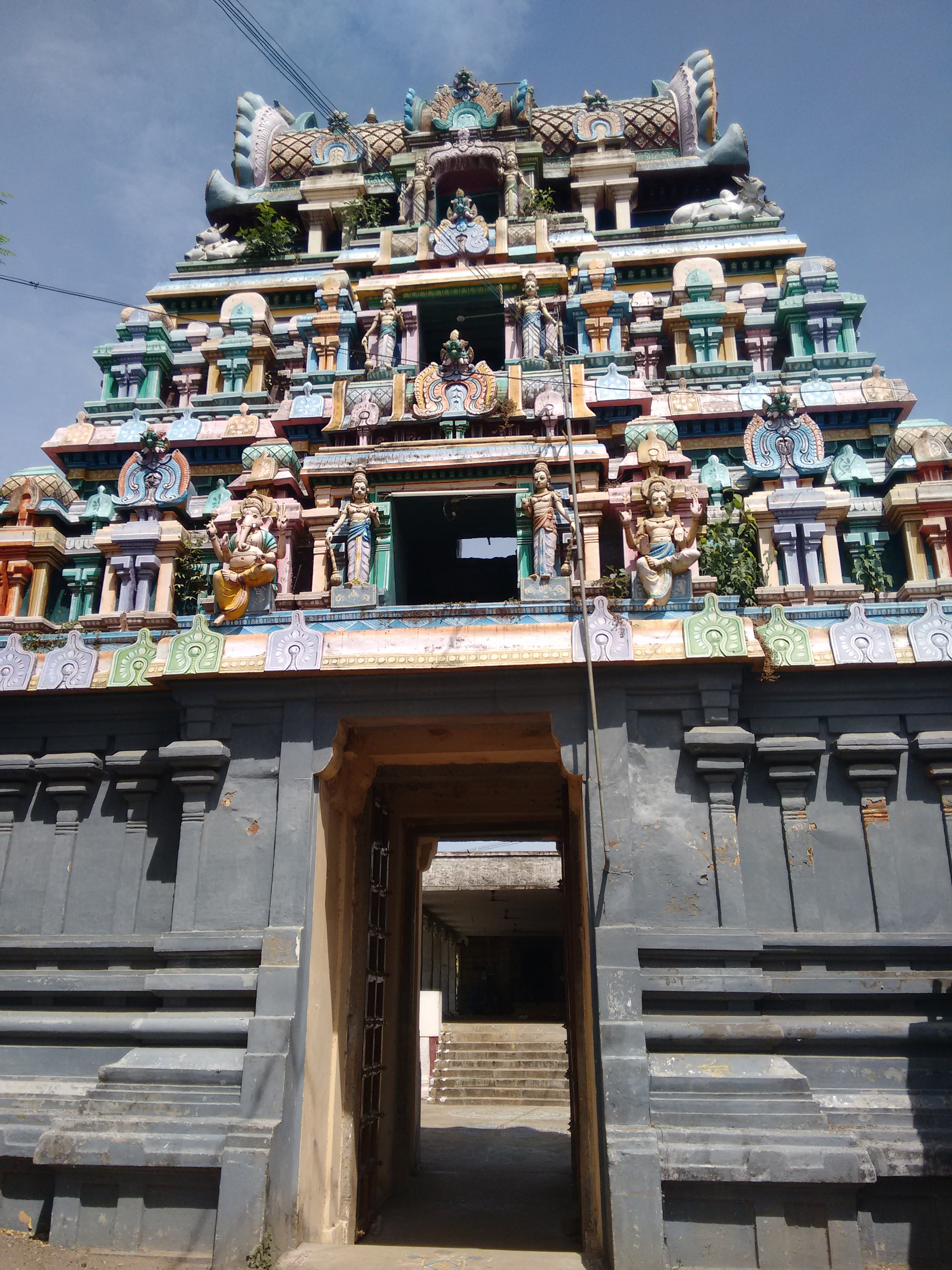
The rajagopura of the temple

Iluppaipattu Neelakandeswarar Temple (இலுப்பைபட்டு நீலகண்டேஸ்வரர் கோயில்) is a Hindu temple located at Iluppaipattu in Mayiladuthurai district of Tamil Nadu, India. The place is also called as Pazhamanni Padikarai and Tirumannippadikkarai. The presiding deity is Shiva. He is called as Thiruneelakandeswarar and Padikarai Nathar. His consort is Amirthavalli.

== Significance ==
It is one of the shrines of the 275 Paadal Petra Sthalams - Shiva Sthalams glorified in the early medieval Tevaram poems by Tamil Saivite Nayanar Sundarar. The temple is counted as one of the temples built on the banks of River Kaveri.
