= Perumpuliyur =

Coordinates: 10°54′N 79°05′E

- village
- Interactive map of Perumpuliyur
- Country: India
- State: Tamil Nadu
- District: Thanjavur
- Taluk: Thiruvaiyaru

Government
  - Type: Panchayati raj (India)
  - Body: Gram panchayat

Population (2001)
  - Total: 1,258

Languages
  - Official: Tamil
- Time zone: UTC+5:30 (IST)

Perumpuliyur is a village in the Thiruvaiyaru taluk of Thanjavur district in Tamil Nadu, India. The village is known for the Vyagrapureeswarar Temple.

== Demographics ==
As per the 2001 census, Senganur had a population of 1,258 with 619 males and 639 females. The sex ratio was 1,032 and the literacy rate, 80.13.
