= Karuppariyalur Kutram Poruttha Naathar Temple =

Hindu temple in Tamil Nadu, India

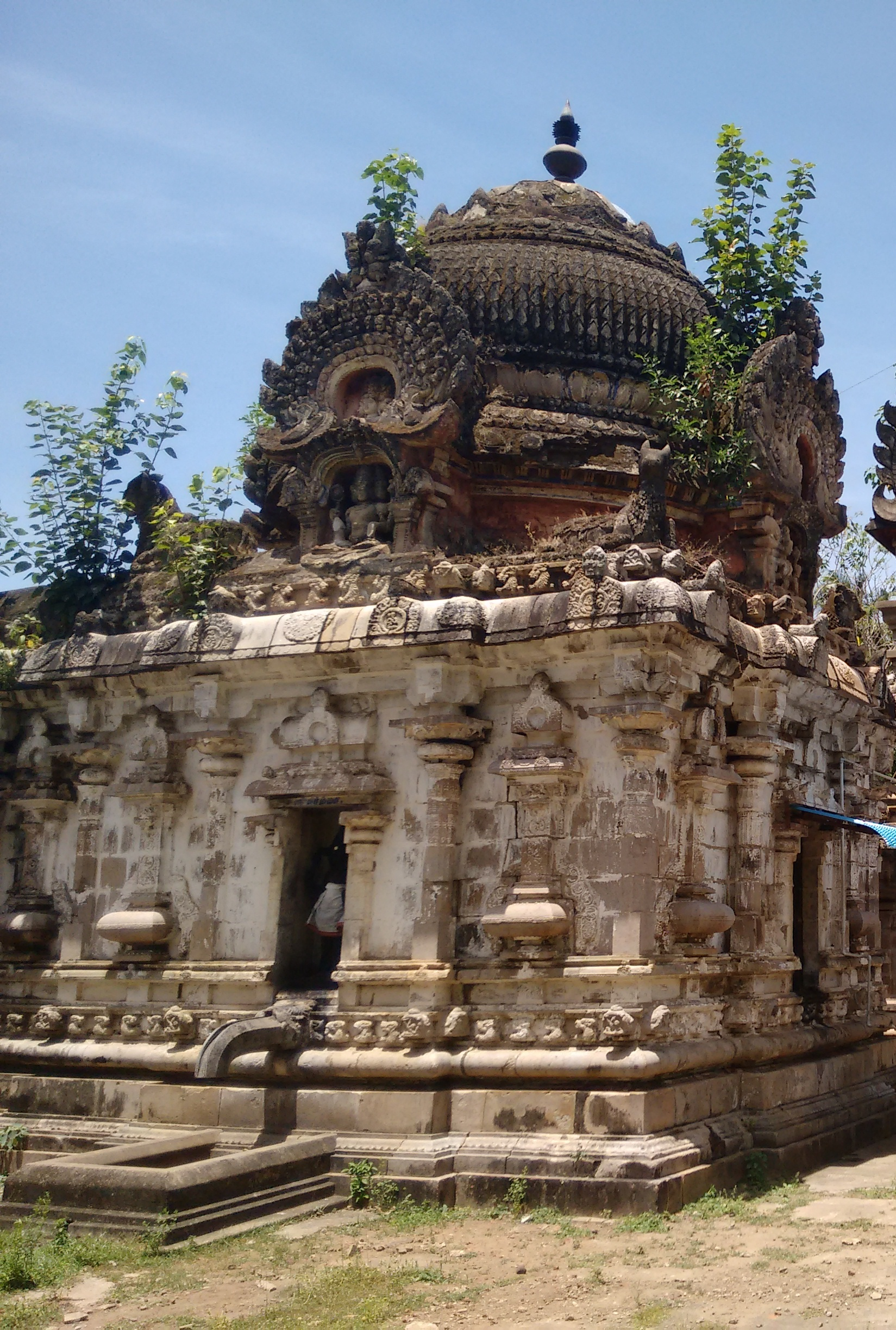
Vimana of the Kutram Poruttha Naathar

Karuppariyalur Kutram Poruttha Naathar temple (கருப்பறியலூர் குற்றம் பொறுத்த நாதர் கோயில்) is a Hindu temple located at Thalaignayiru (or Thalainayar) in Mayiladuthurai District of Tamil Nadu, India. The historical name is Karuppariyalur or Karmanaasapuram. The presiding deity is Shiva. He is called as Kutram Poruttha Naathar(Aparaathakshameswarar). His consort is Kolvalai Naayaki .

== Significance ==
It is one of the shrines of the 275 Paadal Petra Sthalams - Shiva Sthalams glorified in the early medieval Tevaram poems by Tamil Saivite Nayanars Tirugnanasambandar and Sundarar.

== Speciality ==
The temple has a separate shrine called madakkovil (hilltop temple) dedicated to Bhairava (Sattanathar).

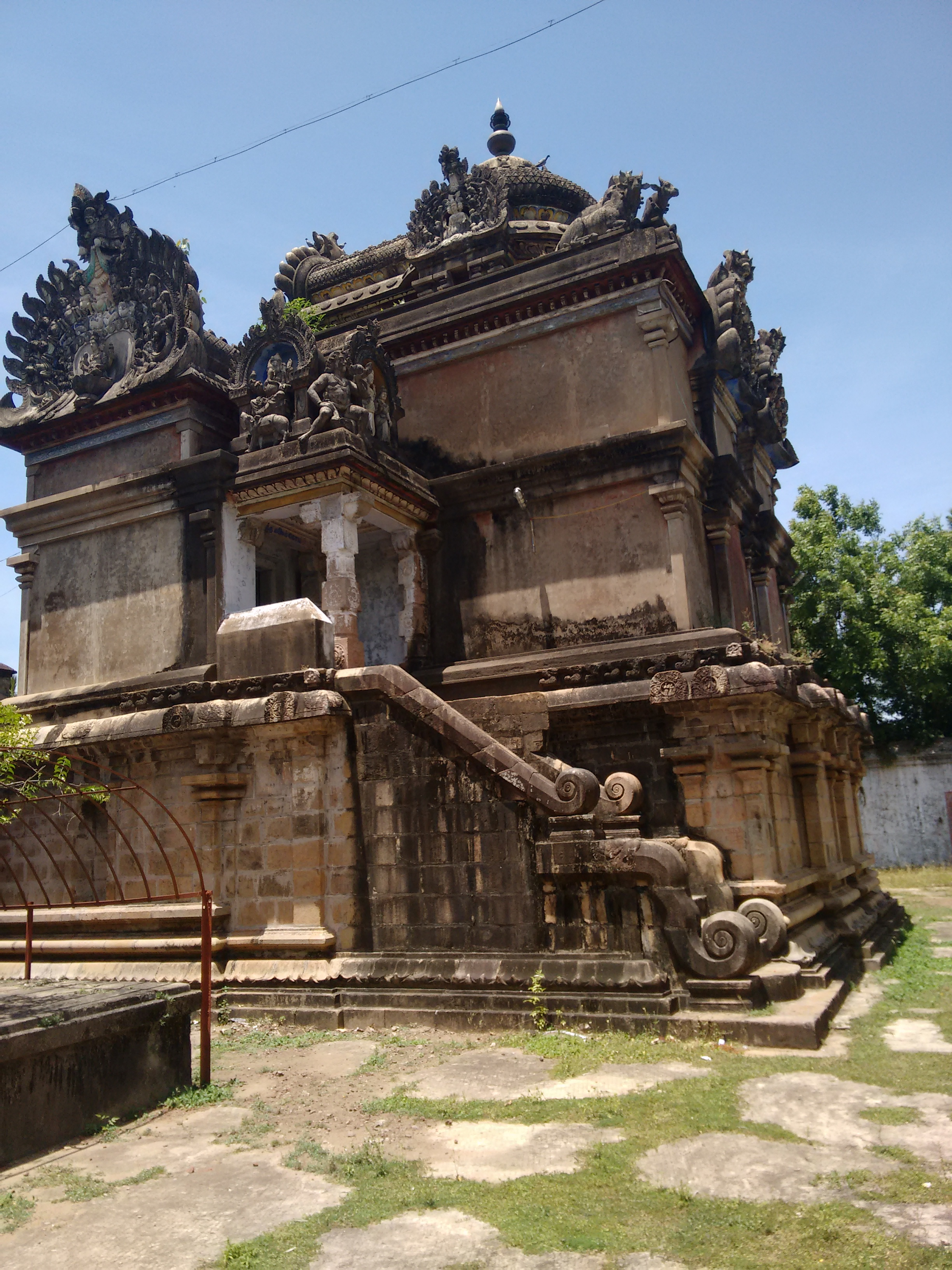
Sattanathar shrine
