= Palaivananathar Temple =

Temple in India

- Tirupalathurai
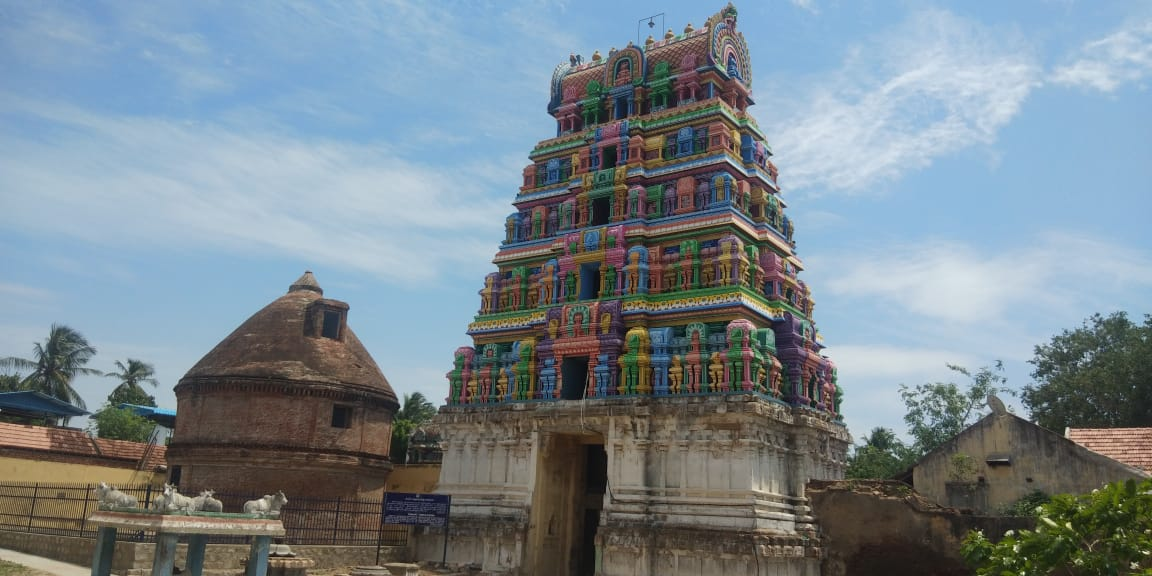

- Location in Tamil Nadu

Religion
- Affiliation: Hinduism
- District: Tanjore
- Deity: Palaivananathar (Shiva) Dhavala Vennakaimangai (Parvati)

Location
- Location: Papanasam
- State: Tamil Nadu
- Country: India
- Coordinates: 10°56′N 79°17′E

Architecture
- Type: Dravidian architecture

Palaivananathar Temple is a Hindu temple dedicated to the deity Shiva, located in Papanasam, in Thanjavur district in the South Indian state of Tamil Nadu. Shiva is worshiped as Papanasanathar, and is represented by the lingam. His consort Parvati is depicted as Thavalavennayagal. The presiding deity is revered in the 7th century Tamil Saiva canonical work, the Tevaram, written by Tamil saint poets known as the Nayanars and classified as Paadal Petra Sthalam.

The temple complex covers around one acre and can be entered through a five-tiered gopuram, the main gateway. The temple has a number of shrines, with those of Papanasanathar and Thavalavennayagal, being the most prominent. All the shrines of the temple are enclosed in large concentric rectangular granite walls. The temple has a granary made of brick from the Vijayanagar Empire, which is maintained as a monument of the state Archeological Department.

The original complex is believed to have been built by Cholas, while the present masonry structure was built by Vijayanagar kings during the 16th century. In modern times, the temple is maintained and administered by the Hindu Religious and Charitable Endowments Department of the Government of Tamil Nadu.

== Legend ==
As per Hindu legend, Shiva is believed to have killed a tiger and worn the skin of the tiger as a sign of his victory in the forest Darukavana. At a later time, during the Mahabharat times, the Pandava prince Arjuna who was in exile along with his brothers was asked by sage Dhaumya to visit the forest and seek the blessings of Shiva. Arjuna visited the place and obtained special skills and weapons in archery from Shiva. The presiding deity is believed to have absolved the sins of various other deities namely Vishnu, Brahma, Rama, Sita, sage Vashista, Lakshmana, other celestial deities and hence got the name Papanasanathar, the one who absolves sins.

== Architecture ==
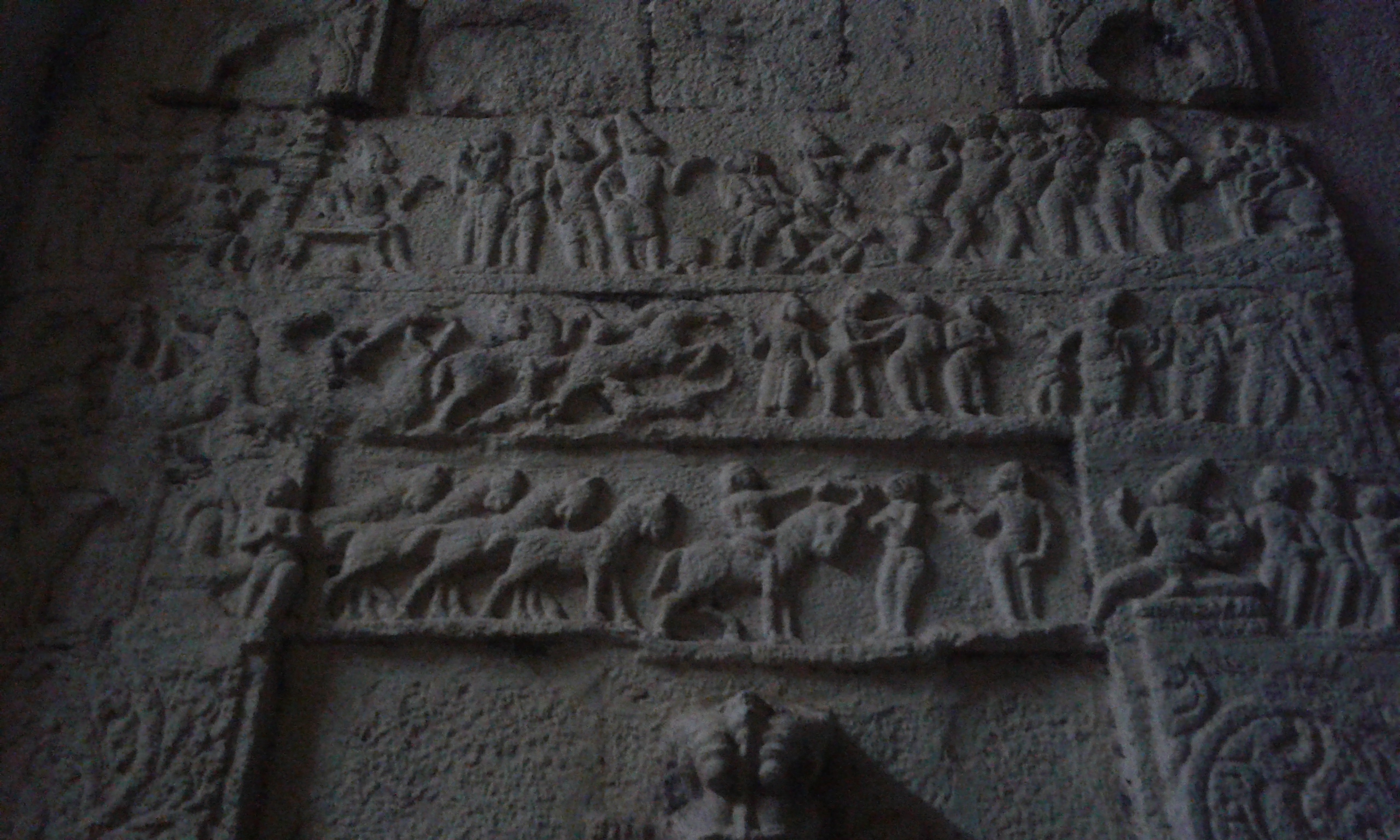
legend of Thiruvilaiyadal depicted on the walls of the gateway tower

Papanasam (Tirunelvli) (Tamil: பாபநாசம், literally means Destruction of Sins) is a panchayat town in Thanjavur district in the Indian state of Tamil Nadu, located 14 km (8.7 mi) from Kumbakonam and 28 km (17 mi) from Thanjavur on the Kumbakonam - Thanjavur highway. There are three rivers named Kaveri, Thirumalairajan and Kudamurutti in the town, with the temple located on the bank of Kudamuruti river. The walls on the temple tower has inscriptions depicting Thiruvilaiyadal, the 64 divine plays of Shiva to test his devotees. Thirupalaithurai temple with two prakarams (outer courtyard) occupies an area of 3 acres (12,000 m^{2}), and its entrance is crowned with a five tiered Rajagopuram. The first precinct houses the images of various supporting deities of Shiva namely, Vinayagar, Dakshninamurthy, Durga, Chandesa and also the images of the 63 nayamars.

There is also a world-famous granary (Store House of paddy) Breadth: 86 feet (26 m), Height: 36 feet (11 m) capacity of 3,000 Kalam (measure) constructed by Raghunatha Nayak in 1600 - 1634. The granary is circular in shape and conical at the top. The State Archaeological Department maintains as a monument of state importance.

== History ==
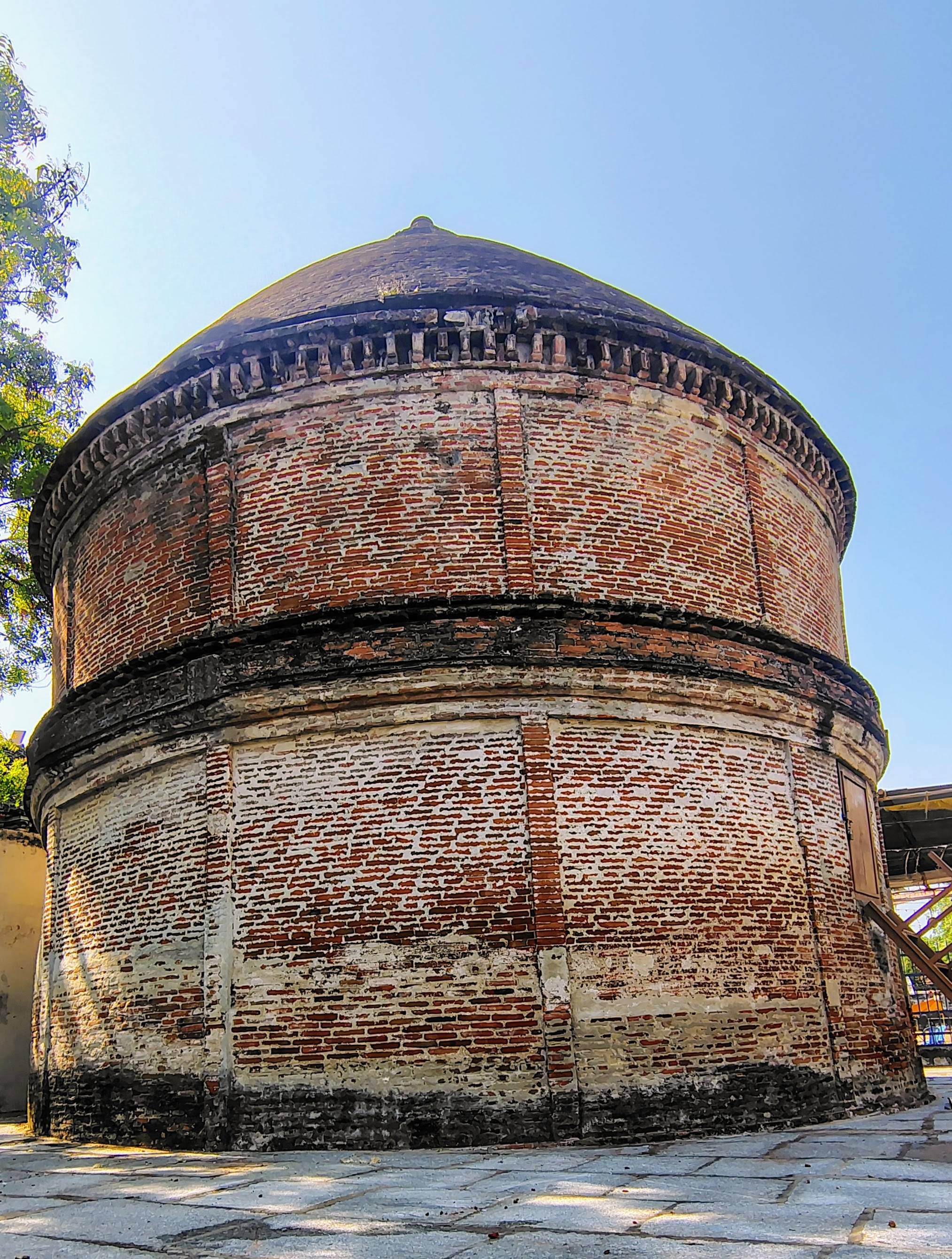
The granary of the Palaivananathar Temple at Papanasam was constructed during the Nayak period, specifically by the Thanjavur Nayak King Ragunatha Nayak (CE 1600-1634).

The original complex is believed to have been built by Cholas, while the present masonry structure was built by Vijayanagar kings during the 16th century. Inscriptions from the Chola and Vijayanagara Empire periods are seen in this temple. The temple has inscriptions from the period of Kulothunga Chola I and Kulothunga Chola III speaking of gifts made to the temple during the Chola period. In the inscriptions, the presiding deity of the temple is referred as Thirupalaithurai Makarathevar. The region is a part of Nittavinoda valanattu Nallur and the inscriptions indicate the survey of land done by the kings. The inscriptions also indicate generous contributions of land for the temple in the form of gardens and arable lands for the maintenance of the temple. In modern times, the temple is administered by the Hindu Religious and Charitable Endowments Department of the Government of Tamil Nadu.

== Festivals and religious importance ==
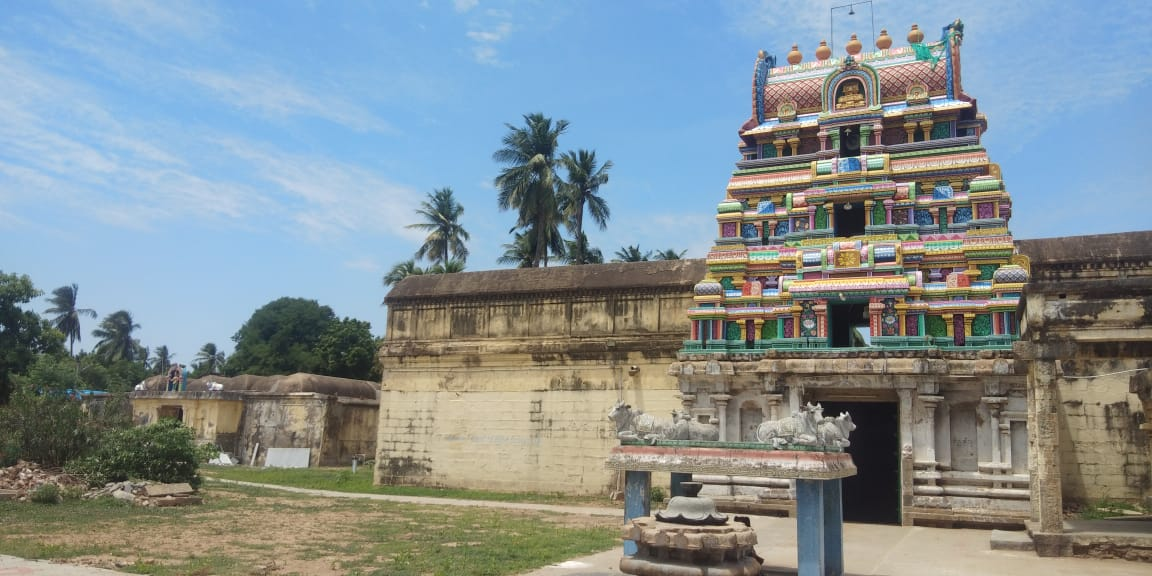
The inner shrine of the temple

It is one of the shrines of the 275 Paadal Petra Sthalams - Shiva Sthalams glorified in the early medieval Tevaram poems by Tamil Saivite Nayanars Sambandar. The temple is counted as one of the temples built on the banks of River Kaveri. It is located on the banks of Kudamurutti, a tributary of river Kaveri.
