= Tirukkandalam Sivanandeswarar Temple =

Hindu temple in Tamil Nadu, India

Tirukkandalam Sivanandeswarar Temple is a Hindu temple located at Tirukkallil (now known as Tirukkandalam) in Tiruvallur district, Tamil Nadu, India. The presiding deity is Shiva. He is called as Sivanandeswarar. His consort is known as Anandavalli Ammai.

== Significance ==
It is one of the shrines of the 275 Paadal Petra Sthalams - Shiva Sthalams glorified in the early medieval Tevaram poems by Tamil Saivite Nayanar Sambandar.
