= Pamani Naganathar Temple =

Religion
- Affiliation: Hinduism
- District: Tiruvarur
- Deity: Lord (Shiva)

Location
- Location: Pamani
- State: Tamil Nadu
- Country: India
- Interactive map of Pamani Naganathar Temple
- Coordinates: 10.69027°N 79.45115°E

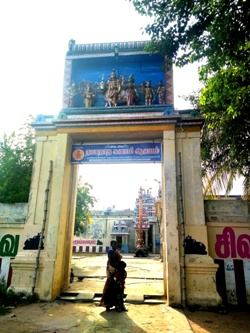
Entrance

Pamani Naganathar Temple(பாமணி நாகநாதர் கோயில்) is a Hindu temple located at Pamani in Tiruvarur district, Tamil Nadu, India. The temple is dedicated to Shiva, as the moolavar presiding deity, in his manifestation as Naganathar. His consort, Parvati, is known as Amirthanayaki. The historical name of the place is Tiru Padaleswaram.

== Significance ==
It is one of the shrines of the 275 Paadal Petra Sthalams - Shiva Sthalams glorified in the early medieval Tevaram poems by Tamil Saivite Nayanar Tirugnanasambandar Sundarar and Thirnavukkarasar (Appar). Also it is Ragu-Kethu pariharasthalam. Which parihaara pooja has done every friday and sunday.

== Gallery ==
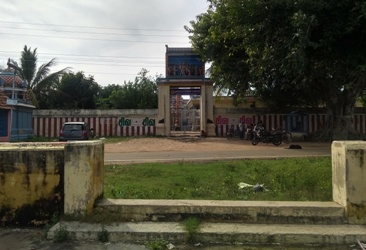
View from Temple tank

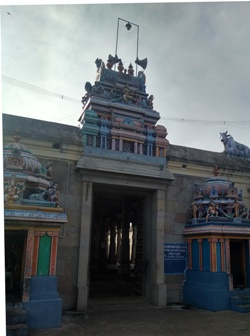
Inner gopura

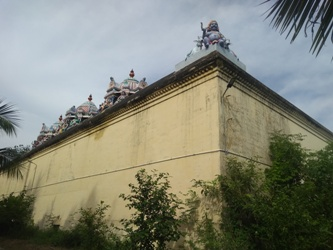
Outer prakara

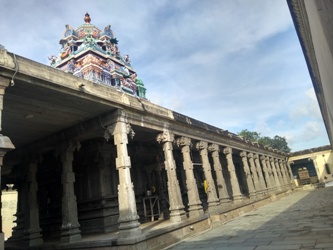
Inner prakara

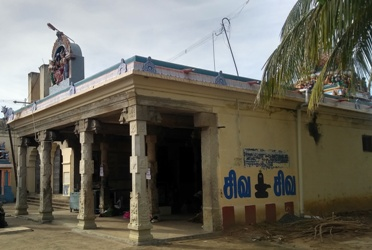
Amirthanayaki shrine

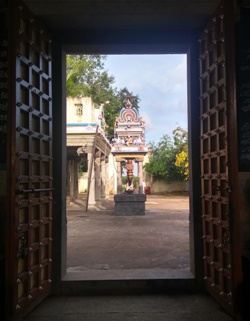
Nandi mandapa from inside

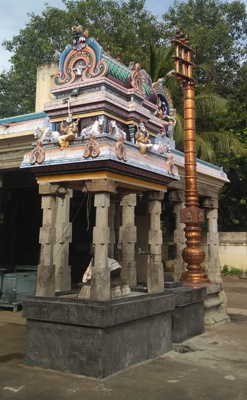
Nandi mandapa, bali peeta and Flagpost
