= Tirunarayur Siddhanatheswarar Temple =

Hindu temple in Tamil Nadu, India

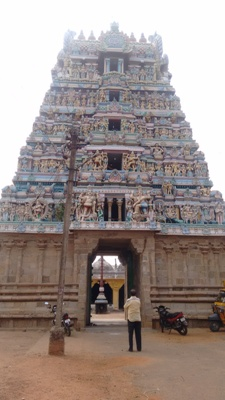
Rajagopura

Tirunarayur Siddhanatheswarar Temple (திருநறையூர் சித்தநாதேசுவரர் கோயில்)is a Hindu temple located at Tirunarayur in Thanjavur district, Tamil Nadu, India. The presiding deity is Shiva. He is called as Siddha Natheswarar. His consort is known as Soundarya Nayaki.

== Significance ==
It is one of the shrines of the 275 Paadal Petra Sthalams - Shiva Sthalams glorified in the early medieval Tevaram poems by Tamil Saivite Nayanars Tirugnanasambandar and Sundarar.

== Literary mention ==
Tirugnanasambandar describes the feature of the deity as:

மெய்யின் மாசர் விரிண் டுகிலிலார்

கையி லுண்டு கழறு முரைகொள்ளேல்
உய்ய வேண்டி லிறைவன் னறையூரில்

செய்யுஞ் சித்தீச் சரமே தவமாமே.

== Photogallery ==
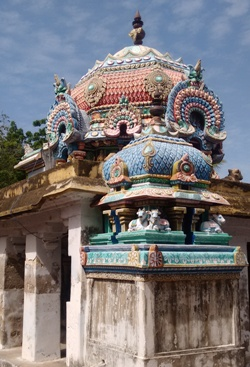
Vimana of the presiding deity

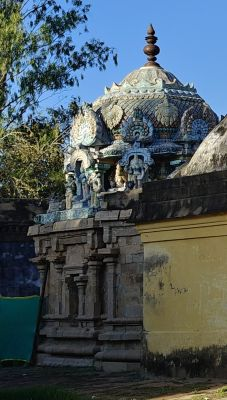
Shrine of the consort

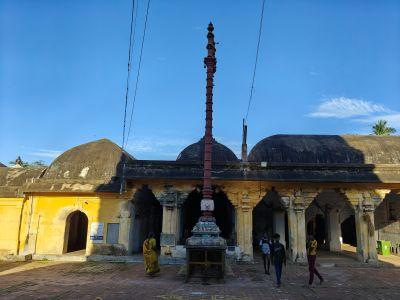
Flagpost, Front mandapa
