= Tirucherai Gnanaparameswarar Temple =

Shiva temple in Tamil Nadu, India

Gnanaparameswarar Temple
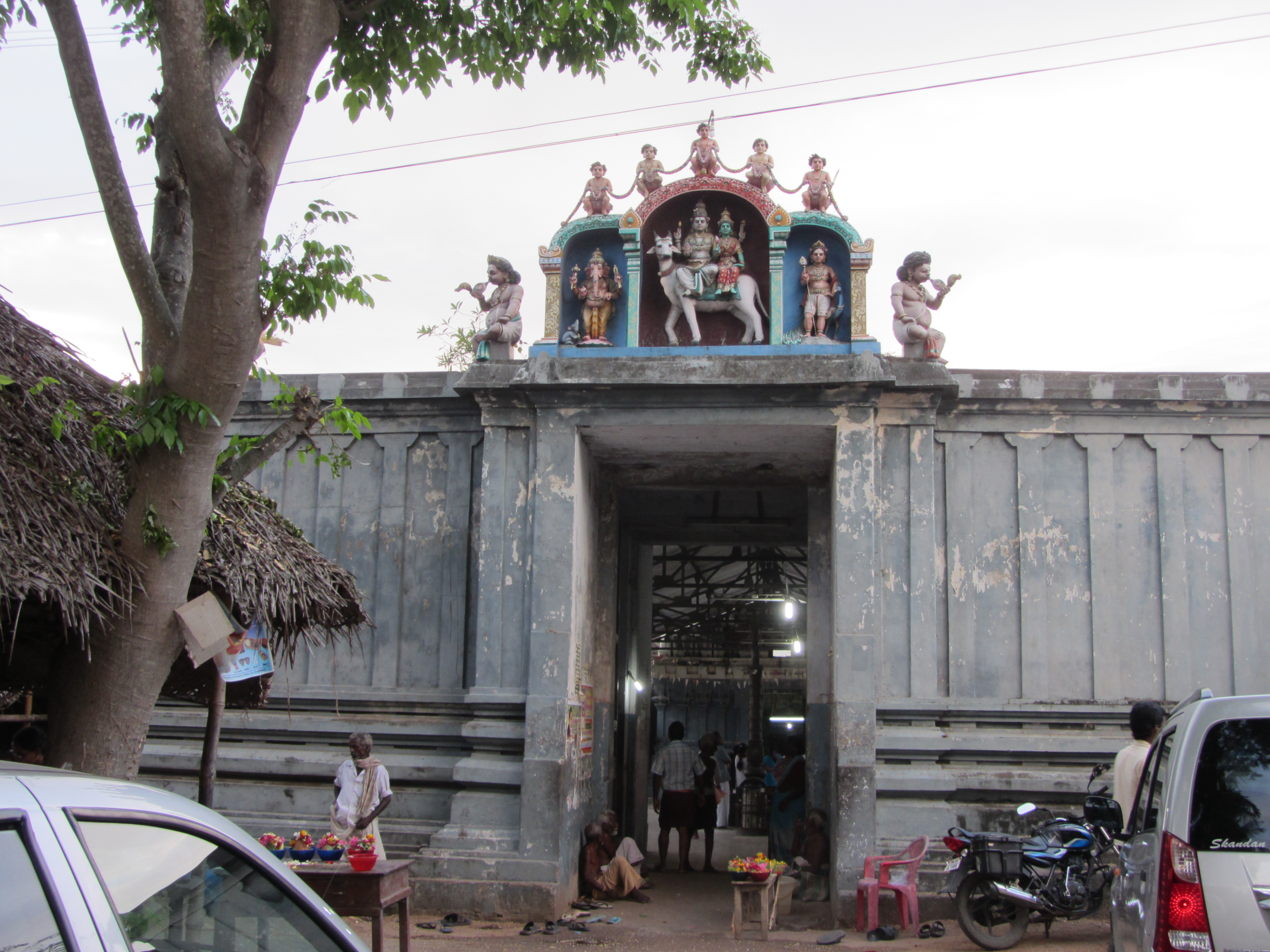

- Location in Tamil Nadu

Religion
- Affiliation: Hinduism
- District: Tiruvarur
- Deity: Gnanaparameswarar(Shiva)

Location
- Location: Tirucherai near Kudavasal
- State: Tamil Nadu
- Country: India
- Coordinates: 10°55′56″N 79°31′58″E

Architecture
- Type: Dravidian architecture

The Tirucherai Gnanaparameswarar Temple is a Tevara sthalam located in the village of Tirucherai near Kudavasal in Tiruvarur district, Tamil Nadu, India. The place is located at a distance of 14 km south of Kumbakonam and 4 km north of Kudavasal.

== Presiding deity ==
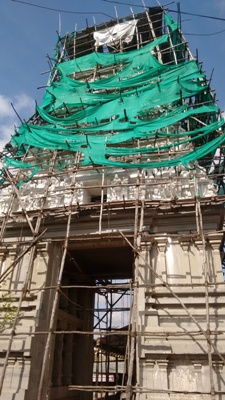
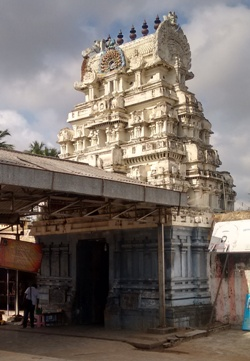
Main gopura and inner gopura

The presiding deity, Shiva, is also known as Gnanaparameswarar and Saraparameswarar. The goddess is known as Gnanambikai and Gnanavalli. Nayanmars Appar and Campantar have sung in praise of the deity. It is one of the shrines of the 275 Paadal Petra Sthalams.

== Those worshipped ==
Markandeya, Kaveri, and Dowmya rishi are said to have worshipped the deity in this shrine.

== Festivals ==
Maha Sivaratri in Tamil month of Masi (February–March), Annabishegam in Aippasi (October–November) and Tiruvathirai in Margazhi (December–January) are celebrated in grand manner.

== See also ==
- Tourist Guide to Tamil Nadu. Sura Books. 2008. p. 86. ISBN 978-81-7478-177-2.
