= Keezhaiyur Kadaimudinathar Temple =

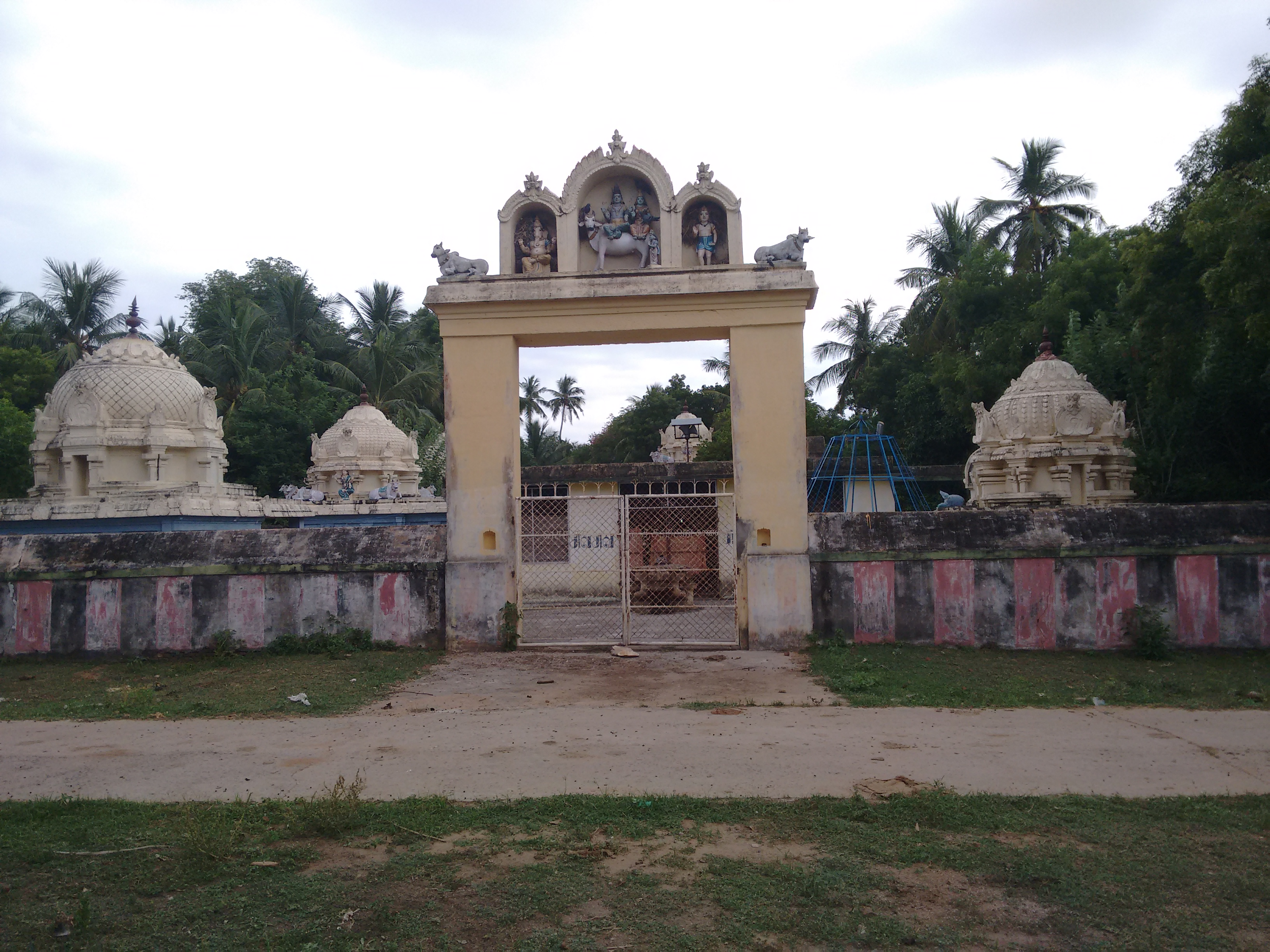
The entrance of the temple

Keezhaiyur Kadaimudinathar Temple (கீழையூர் கடைமுடிநாதர் கோயில்) is a Hindu temple located at Keezhaiyur in Mayiladuthurai District of Tamil Nadu, India. The presiding deity is Shiva. He is called as Kadaimudinathar. His consort is Abirami.

== Significance ==
It is one of the shrines of the 275 Paadal Petra Sthalams - Shiva Sthalams glorified in the early medieval Tevaram poems by Tamil Saivite Nayanar Tirugnanasambandar. It is believed that Brahma is believed to have worshipped Shiva in the temple. The temple is counted as one of the temples built on the banks of River Kaveri.
