= Tiruttelicheri Parvatheeswarar Temple =

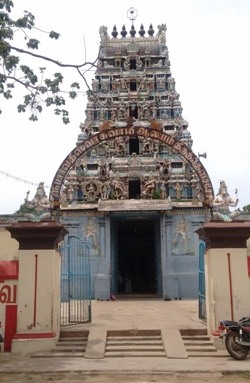
The entrance of the temple

Tiruttelicheri Parvatheeswarar Temple (in Tamil : திருத்தெளிச்சேரி பார்வதீசுவரர் கோயில்) is a Hindu temple located at Tiruttelicheri, now known as Koilpatthu, in the periphery of Karaikal city in the Union Territory of Puducherry, India. The presiding deity is Shiva, called as Parvatheeswarar. His consort is known as Parvathi Ammai.

== Significance ==
It is one of the shrines of the 275 Paadal Petra Sthalams - Shiva Sthalams glorified in the early medieval Tevaram poems by Tamil Saivite Nayanar Tirugnanasambandar.

== Literary mention ==
Tirugnanasambandar describes the feature of the deity as:

மந்தி ரந்தரு மாமறை யோர்கள் தவத்தவர்

செந்தி லங்கு மொழியவர் சேர்தெளிச் சேரியீர்
வெந்த லாகிய சாக்கிய ரோடு சமணர்கள்

தந்தி றத்தன நீக்குவித் தீரோர் சதிரரே.

== Photogallery ==
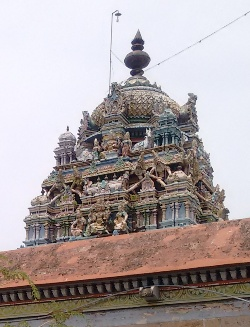
Vimana of the presiding deity

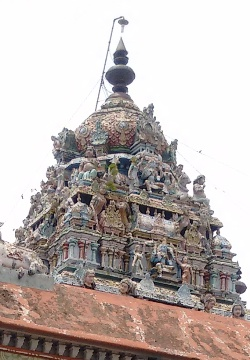
Vimana of the consort

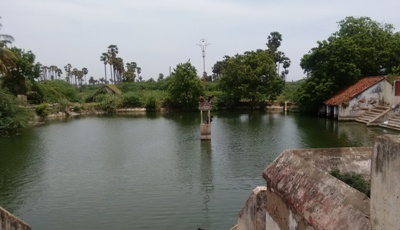
Temple tank
