= Vijayamangai Vijayanatheswarar Temple =

Hindu temple in Tamil Nadu, India

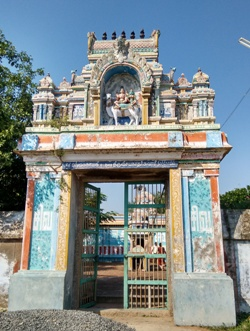
Temple entrance

Vijayamangai Vijayanatheswarar Temple (or Vijaya Natheswarar Temple) is a Hindu temple located at Thiruvijayamangai (or Vijayamangai) in the Thanjavur district of Tamil Nadu, India. The presiding deity is Shiva. He is called as Vijayanatheswarar. His consort is known as Mangalanayaki.

== Location ==
Thiruvijayamangai is situated at a distance of 4 kilometres from Thiruppurambiyam in Thanjavur district and 11 kilometres from Kumbakonam.

== History ==
The temple was constructed by the Medieval Cholas in accordance with contemporary Chola designs.

== Shrines ==
The presiding deity is Shiva and the consort is Mangalanayaki or Mangalambikai. There are smaller shrines to Ganesha, Dakshinamoorthy, Surya and Chandra.

== Significance ==
It is one of the shrines of the 275 Paadal Petra Sthalams - Shiva Sthalams glorified in the early medieval Tevaram poems by Tamil Saivite Nayanars Tirugnanasambandar and Tirunavukkarasar.

According to the Indian epic Mahabharatha, while Arjuna was meditating upon Shiva seeking the Pasupata weapon on the advice of Krishna, the demon Mookasura attacked him. At once, Arjuna shot an arrow at him. Meanwhile, Shiva had also arrived at the spot along with Parvati in the guise of a hunter and shot Mookasura. Both then argued as to whose arrow had shot Mookasura dead when Arjuna violently struck Shiva causing tremors in the three worlds. Impressed with Arjuna's strength, Shiva reverted to his normal self and bestowed upon him the Pasupata weapon which was crucial to his victory in the Kurukshetra War.

== Literary mention ==
Tirugnanasambandar describes the feature of the deity as:

தோடமர் காதினன் துதைந்த நீற்றினன்

ஏடமர் கோதையோ டினித மர்விடம்
காடமர் மாகரி கதறப்போர்த்ததோர்

வேடம துடையணல் விசய மங்கையே.

Tirunavukkarasar describes the feature of the deity as:

வந்து கேண்மின் மயல்தீர் மனிதர்காள்

வெந்த நீற்றன் விசயமங் கைப்பிரான்
சிந்தை யால்நினை வார்களைச் சிக்கெனப்

பந்து வாக்கி உய்யக்கொளுங் காண்மினே.
