= Yazhmoorinathar Temple =

Hindu temple in Karaikkal, Pondicherry, India

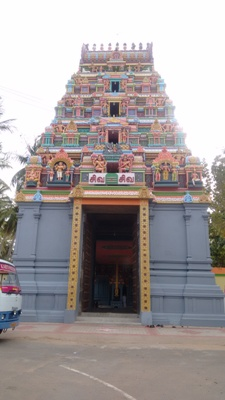
The main entrance of the temple

Yazhmoorinathar Temple (in Tamil : தருமபுரம் யாழ்மூரிநாதர் கோயில்) is a Hindu temple located at Dharmapuram near Karaikal, an enclave of the Union Territory of Pondicherry, in Southern India. The presiding deity is Shiva, called as Yazh Moori Nathar. His consort is known as Thenamirthavalli.

== Significance ==
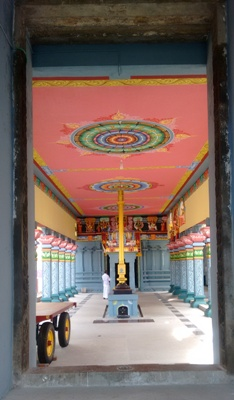
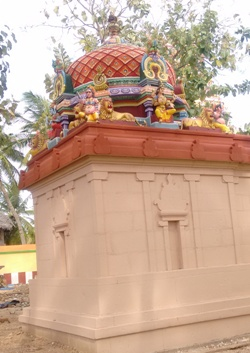
Front mandapa, Amman shrine

It is one of the shrines of the 275 Paadal Petra Sthalams - Shiva Sthalams glorified in the early medieval Tevaram poems by the Tamil Saivite Nayanar Tirugnanasambandar.

== Literary mention ==
Tirugnanasambandar describes the feature of the deity as:

நேரும வர்க்குணரப் புகி லில்லைநெ டுஞ்சடைக் கடும் புனல் படந் திடம் படுவ்வதொர் நிலையர்

பேரும வர்க்கெனையா யிர முன்னைப்பி றப்பிறப் பிலா தவருடற் றடர்த் தபெற்றியா ரறிவார்
ஆர வர்க்கழல்வா யதொர் நாகம ழஃகுறவ் வெழுஃ கொழும் மலர் கொள்பொன் னிதழிநல் லலங்கல்

தாரம வர்க்கிமவான் மக ளூர்வது போர்விடை கடிபடு செடி பொழிற் றருமபு ரம்பதியே.
