= Srinivasa Perumal Temple, Kudavasal =

Srinivasa Perumal Temple
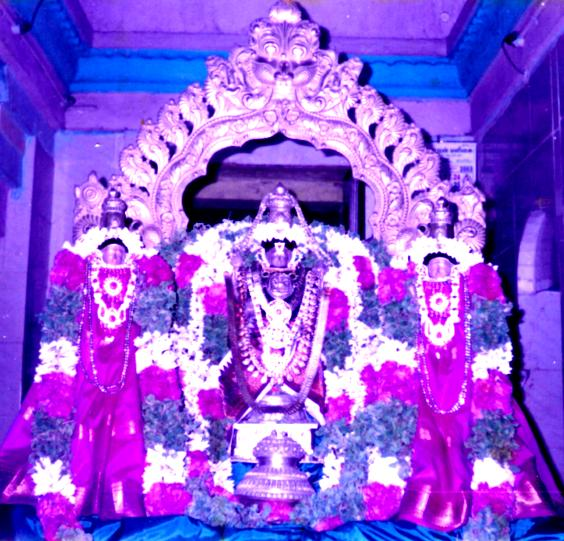

Religion
- Affiliation: Hinduism
- Deity: Srinivasa (Vishnu), Sridevi (as Alarmelu Manga Thaayar)
- Features: Tower: Garuda Vimanam; Temple tank: Amirtha Pushakarani

Location
- Location: Kudavasal
- State: Tamil Nadu
- Country: India

Architecture
- Type: Kovil
- Completed: 1509-1529 CE
- Direction of façade: North-facing

The Sri Srinivasa Perumal Temple in Kudavasal, Tamil Nadu, India is a Hindu temple dedicated to Srinivasa, a form of the god Vishnu. The temple is glorified by The son of Pulastya Maharishi Kubera and classified as one of the 108 Abhimana Kshethrams of the Vaishnavate tradition. Kudavasal is a small town located in the Thiruvarur district, in between two distributaries of Kaveri river, Kudamurutti and Chola Choodamani. Srinivasa appears with his consorts Sridevi and Bhudevi.

The temple's speciality is that it has the only north-facing sanctum of Srinivasa in the World.

== Legend ==
Kubera, God of Wealth and the ruler of the North direction, undertook severe penance and wanted Srinivasa to provide darshan facing the North. Accepting his prayers, he is said to have appeared here in the Direction North.

== The temple ==
The temple is more than 500 years old. The temple follows the traditional Vadakalai sect of Iyengars.

The last Samprokshanam to the Temple was performed in 1996 by the Board of Trustees with the help of Kudavasal Srinivasa Perumal Seva Samithi. During this renovation, the Temple Quarters was also rebuilt and a new ‘Transit House’ with basic amenities was constructed for the convenience of the sevarthis from outstations.

The Uthsava Murthis were stolen and with great efforts by the Board of Trustees, they were recovered subsequently. Thereafter, the Board of Trustees as well as the Kudavasal Srinivasa Perumal Seva Samithi took several steps to improve the security arrangements in the Temple. Thanks to these measures and perseverance, the Idols could be brought back to their original abode recently. A proposal arose to conduct Samprokshanam again for the temple in view of last Samprokshanam was held in the year 1996. Efforts started with the Balalayam performed on 8 and 9 July 2008. The Maha kumbabhishekam was performed on 21 March 2009.
