= Kurumanakkudi Kannayiram Udayar Temple =

Hindu temple in India

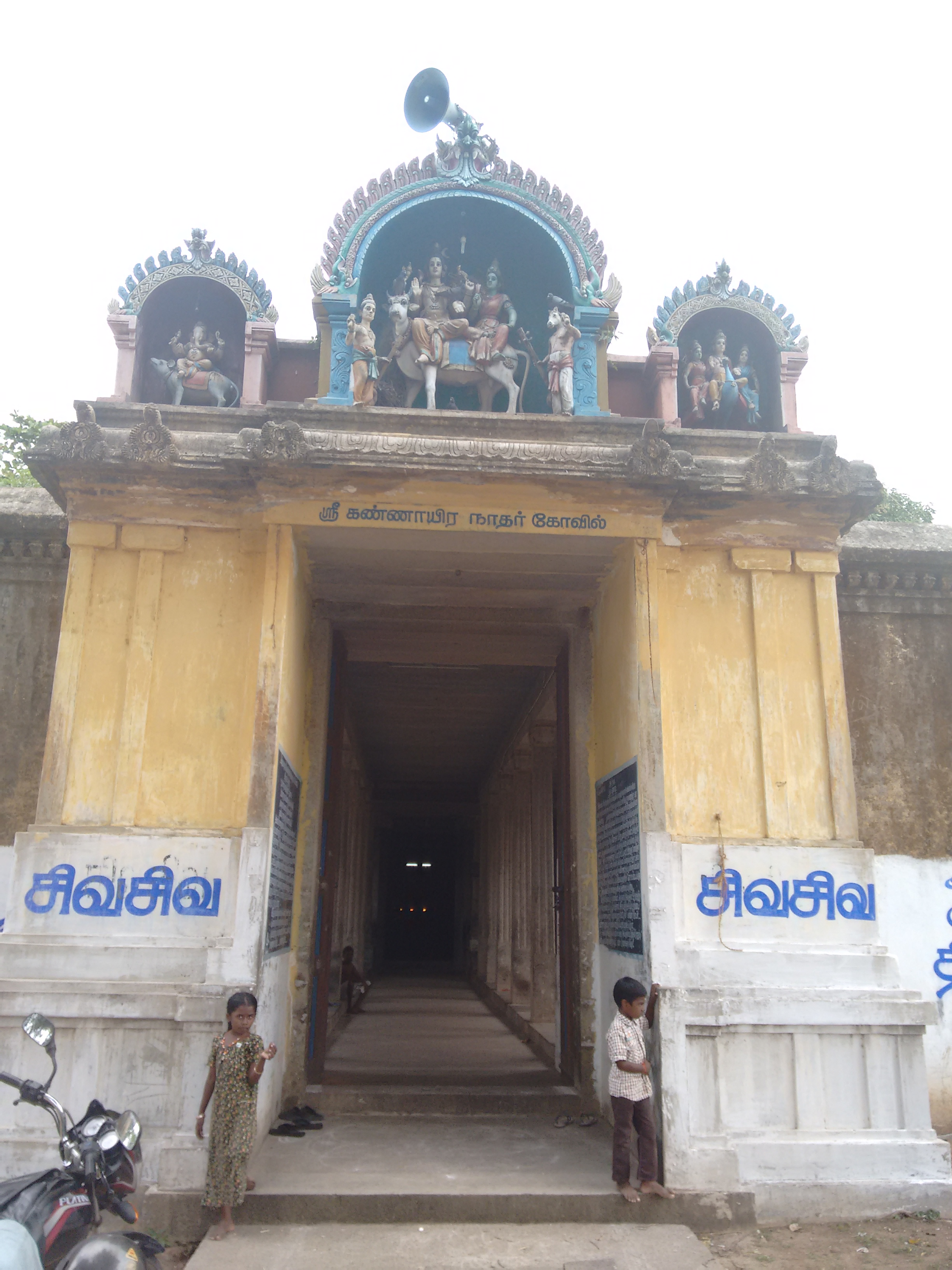
The entrance of the temple

Kurumanakkudi Kannayiram Udayar Temple(குறுமாணக்குடி கண்ணாயிரமுடையார் கோயில்) is a Hindu temple located at Kurumanakkudi in Mayiladuthurai district of Tamil Nadu, India. This temple is also known as Kannarkovil. The presiding deity is Shiva. He is called as Kannayiram Udayar and Kannayiranathar. His consort is Murugu Valar Kothai Naayaki.

== Significance ==
It is one of the shrines of the 275 Paadal Petra Sthalams - Shiva Sthalams glorified in the early medieval Tevaram poems by Tamil Saivite Nayanar Tirugnanasambandar. It is believed that Vishnu in the form of Vamana, is believed to have worshipped Shiva at this place.
