= Paridiniyamam Parithiappar Temple =

Temple in India

Keezhvengainaadu Paridiniyamam Parithiappar Temple
- கீழ்வேங்கைநாடு பரிதிநியமம் பரிதியப்பர் கோயில்
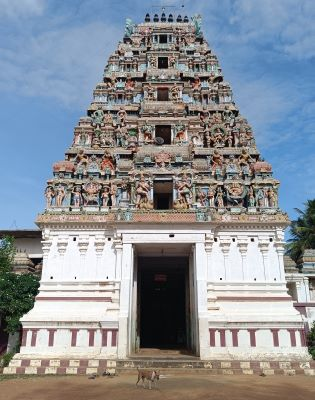
- Rajagopura

- Location in Tamil Nadu, India

Religion
- Affiliation: Hinduism
- Deity: Shiva (Parithiappar)

Location
- Location: Keezhvengainaadu, Parithiappar Koil, Thanjavur district, Tamil Nadu, India
- Country: India
- Territory: Keezhvengainaadu
- Coordinates: 10°40′38″N 79°14′14″E

Architecture
- Type: Tamil temple
- Temple: 1

Website
- Sri Bhaskareswarar, Parithiappar (Parithi Niyamam) temple

Keezhvengainaadu Paridiniyamam Parithiappar Temple (கீழ்வேங்கைநாடு பரிதிநியமம் பரிதியப்பர் கோயில்) is a Tamil temple located at Parithiappar Koil, Keezhvengainaadu in Thanjavur district, Tamil Nadu, India. The temple is dedicated to Shiva, as the moolavar presiding deity, in his manifestation as Parithiappar. His consort, Parvati, is known as Mangalambikai.

== Significance ==
It is one of the shrines of the 276 Paadal Petra Sthalams - Shiva Sthalams glorified in the early medieval Tevaram poems by Tamil Saivite Nayanar Tirugnanasambandar. Located on the Thanjavur-Pudukkottai road, Paruthiapparkoil was the place where Surya (the sun god of Hindu mythology) is believed to have worshipped Shiva. Hence, the temple built on the spot got the name "Paruthiapparkoil" which means "Temple of the Sun" in Tamil language and "Bhaskareswarar", an alternate name of the Sun-god Surya in Sanskrit. Later, Paruthiapparkoil was also used to denote the settlement which grew around the temple.
