= Anniyur Abathsahayeswarar Temple =

Shiva temple in Tamil Nadu, India

Coordinates: 11°07′21″N 79°36′23″E

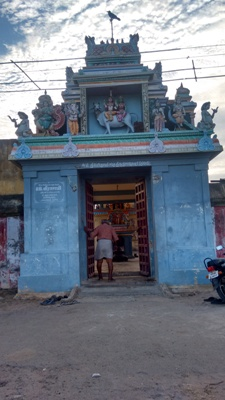
The entrance of the temple

Anniyur Abathsahayeswarar Temple (பொன்னூர் ஆபத்சகாயேசுவரர் கோயில்) is a Hindu temple located at Ponnur in Mayiladuthurai district of Tamil Nadu, India. The historical name of the place is Tiru Anniyur. The presiding deity is Shiva. He is called as Abathsahayeswarar. His consort is known as Perianayaki.

== Significance ==
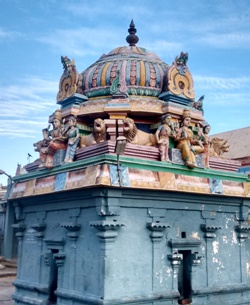
vimana of Amman shrine

It is one of the shrines of the 275 Paadal Petra Sthalams - Shiva Sthalams glorified in the early medieval Tevaram poems by Tamil Saivite Nayanars Tirugnanasambandar and Tirunavukkarasar.

== Literary mention ==
Gnanasambandar describes the feature of the deity of Anniyur as:

நீதி பேணுவீர், ஆதி யன்னியூர்ச்
சோதி நாமமே, ஓதி யுய்ம்மினே.

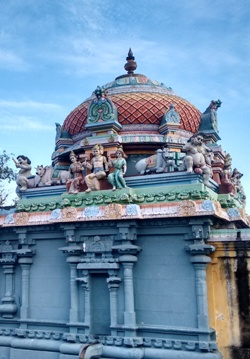
vimana of Presiding deity
