= Sivanandeswarar Temple =

Shiva temple in Tamil Nadu, India

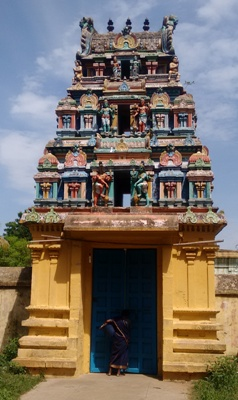
Gopura

Sivanandeswarar Temple (திருப்பந்துறை சிவானந்தேசுவரர் கோயில் ])is a Hindu temple located at Tirupandurai in Thanjavur district, Tamil Nadu, India. The presiding deity is Shiva. He is called as Sivanandeswarar. His consort is known as Mangalambikai.

Location: Sri Sivanantheswarar Temple Padal petra sthalam, Tirupandurai Rd, Thiruppandurai, Tamil Nadu 612602

near Nachiyarkoil

== Significance ==
It is one of the shrines of the 275 Paadal Petra Sthalams - Shiva Sthalams glorified in the early medieval Tevaram poems by Tamil Saivite Nayanar Tirugnanasambandar.

== Literary Mention ==
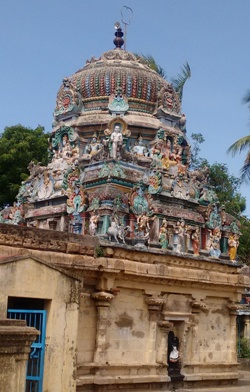
Vimana of the presiding deity

Tirugnanasambandar describes the feature of the deity as:

புள்வாய் போழ்ந்து மாநிலங் கீண்ட பொருகடல் வண்ணனும் பூவின்

உள்வா யல்லி மேலுறை வானு முணர்வரி யானுமை கேள்வன்
முள்வாய் தாளின் தாமரை மொட்டின் முகமலரக் கயல் பாயக்

கள்வாய் நீலங் கண்மல ரேய்க்குங் காமர்பெ ருந்துறை யாரே.
