= Thiru Aappanoor =

Aapudayar Temple
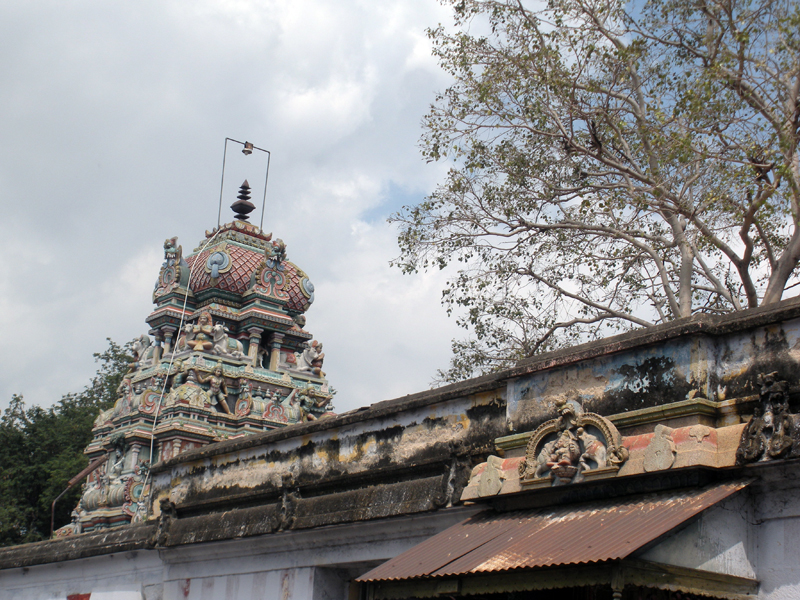

- Thiruvaappudaiyaar Temple, Sellur, Madurai, Tamil Nadu

Religion
- Affiliation: Hinduism
- District: Madurai
- Deity: Sokkanathar
- Festival: Maha Shivaratri

Location
- Location: Sellur, Madurai
- State: Tamil Nadu
- Country: India
- Coordinates: 9.9305°N 78.1228°E

Architecture
- Type: Dravidian architecture
- Completed: Unknown

Specifications
- Temple: One
- Elevation: 182 m (597 ft)

Thiru Aappanoor is a Hindu temple of the god Shiva in Sellur, Madurai, India. The Pandya Kings and the Royal Sethupathi kings made many contributions to this temple. It is one of the shrines of the 275 Paadal Petra Sthalams.

== Legend ==
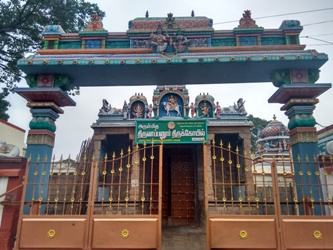
Temple entrance

One day a wedge, or 'aappu', is said to have miraculously transformed into a shivalingam to allow the Pandya King Solandhagan to cross the flooded Vaigai River to reach the Meenakshi Amman Temple (the principal temple in Madurai); it is from this event that the Thiru Aappanoor temple takes its name. On another occasion, Shiva is also believed to have miraculously caused the sand of the river here to turn into rice during a famine.

== Temple structure ==
The Pandya kings began the construction of the temple, which was further expanded by the Nayak kings. The shrine of the presiding deity, Shiva faces east. A shrine to Subrahmanya (Kartikeya) is situated between the shrines of his parents Shiva and Ambal (Parvati). Thus, the temple is said to be of the Somaskanda type, an icon where Kartikeya is depicted dancing between his parents. The god Hanuman is found on a pillar, and there is a fig tree (Ficus religiosa) in between the two shrines, with a Vinayagar (Ganesha, another son of Shiva) statue beneath it. This tree is considered to be a Shtala Virutcham or temple tree.

Sambandar composed the Tevaram Pathigam on Thiru Aappanoor.

== Festivals ==
The Brahmotsava is celebrated at Thiru Aappanoor for the Tamil month of Maasi. Navaratri is also celebrated at the temple. On the day of Panguni Uththiram, images of Meenakshi and Sundareswarar are brought to Thiru Aappanoor from the Meenakshi Amman temple across the river, and return on Rishabha Vaahanam. The festival idols at the temple are made of silver, and are taken in procession during the bimonthly Pradosham festival.

== Transport links ==
Thiru Aappanoor is located in Sellur, part of Madurai city in Tamil Nadu. Town bus services run from Madurai Periyar bus stand, and the Simmakkal bus stop is also close by on the other side of the river.
