= Arulmigu Manneaswarar Temple, Annur =

Historic Hindu temple in Tamil Nadu, India

Arulmigu Manneaswarar Temple
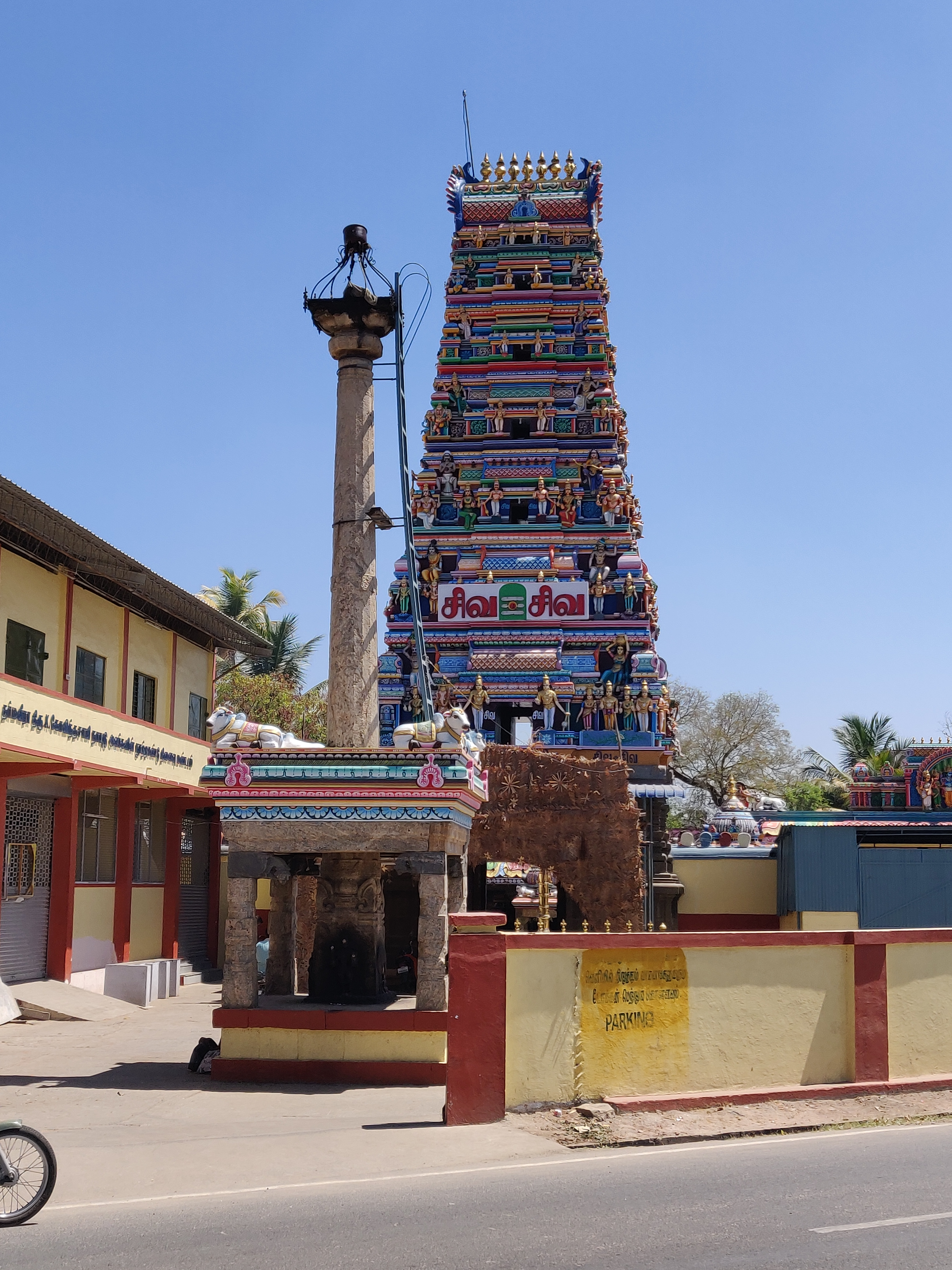

- Location within Tamil Nadu Location within India

Religion
- Affiliation: Hinduism
- District: Coimbatore
- Deity: Mannaeswarar (Shiva); Arundavaselvi (Parvati)
- Festivals: Chithirai Thiruvizha, Maha Shivarathiri, Cradle festival
- Governing body: Hindu Religious and Charitable Endowments Department

Location
- State: Tamil Nadu
- Country: India
- Interactive map of Arulmigu Manneaswarar Temple
- Coordinates: 11.232683°N 77.103642°E

Architecture
- Type: Dravidian architecture
- Inscriptions: over 41
- Elevation: 244 m (801 ft)

Arulmigu Manneaswarar Temple is a historic temple located at Annur in the Indian state of Tamil Nadu. It is a temple dedicated to Lord Shiva

== Etymology ==
According to legends, two theories are proposed. According to the first one, Lord Shiva granted his blessings to a local tribal leader named Annie, so the Presiding deity is known as "Anneaswarar" from whom the name of the town Annur is being derived. According to the second one, Lord Shiva forgave the tribal leader named Annie, so the Presiding deity is known as "Manneaswarar".

== Architecture ==
The temple is an expertise of Chola style as a part of Tamil Architecture. The chief deity, "Manneaswarar" faces to the west. His consort, Arundavaselvi, a form of Parvati is located at Amman Sannithi. Other deities such as Murugan, Maanikavasakar, Thirugnyanasambandar, Anjanaeya and a seven-headed snake statue.

== Inscriptions ==
There are 41 inscriptions present in this temple. The inscriptions belongs to Kokalimoorka Vikrama Chozhan (11th Century A.D), Kulothunga Chozha –I and II ( 12th and 13th century A.D respectively ), Virarajendra Chozha (13th Century A.D ), Vikrama Chozha – II & III ( 13th Century A.D) and Hoysala King Vira Vallalan ( 15th Century A.D ).

== Festival ==
The car festival of the temple is celebrated in the month of Margazhi. Maha Shivaratri is celebrated in the month of Maasi.

== Temple timings ==
The temple will be kept open between: 06.00 hrs to 01.00 hrs and 16.30 hrs to 20.30 hrs.
