= Vaigalnathar Temple =

Shiva temple in Tamil Nadu, India

- Vaigalnathar Temple, Thiruvaigal, Mayiladuthurai, Tamil Nadu

Religion
- Affiliation: Hinduism
- District: Mayiladuthurai
- Deity: Lord Shiva

Location
- Location: Thiruvaigal
- State: Tamil Nadu
- Country: India
- Coordinates: 10°59′04.6″N 79°30′58.3″E

Architecture
- Elevation: 39.76 m (130 ft)

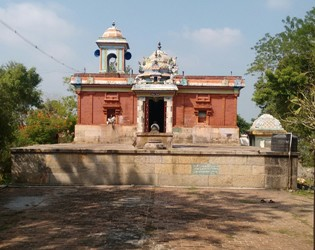
The temple

Vaigalnathar Temple is a Hindu temple in the village of Thiruvaigal in the Mayiladuthurai of Tamil Nadu, India. The temple is dedicated to Shiva.

== History ==
The Vaigalnathar Temple is believed to be one of the three major temples constructed by the Early Chola king Kochengannan. Praises of the temple are found in the Thevaram as well as Thiruvasakam. The presiding deity is Shiva in form of Shenbaga Aranyeswarar.

== Shrines ==
The temple complex has shrines to Brahma, Vishnu, Lakshmi and Agastya. It is one of the shrines of the 275 Paadal Petra Sthalams. Thirunavukkarasar have sung hymns in praise of the temple.
