= Vyagrapureeswarar Temple =

Shiva temple in Tamil Nadu, India

Vyagrapureeswarar Temple is a Hindu temple located at Perumpuliyur near Thiruvaiyaru in the Thanjavur district of Tamil Nadu, India.

== Deity ==
The temple faces east. The principal deity is Shiva. There are also shrines to Ganesha, Murugan, Valli, Deivayanai, Dakshinamurthy, Ardhanareeswara, Chandikeswara, Somaskanda, Nataraja, Bhairava and the Navagrahas.

== Significance ==
Vyagrapureeswarar Temple also known as Perumpuliyur is one of the five shrines associated with the Saivite saint Vyagrapada. Hymns have been composed in praise of the temple by Sambandar in the Thevaram.
