= Therazhundur Vedapureeswarar Temple =

Shiva temple in Tamil Nadu, India

Vedapureeswarar Temple
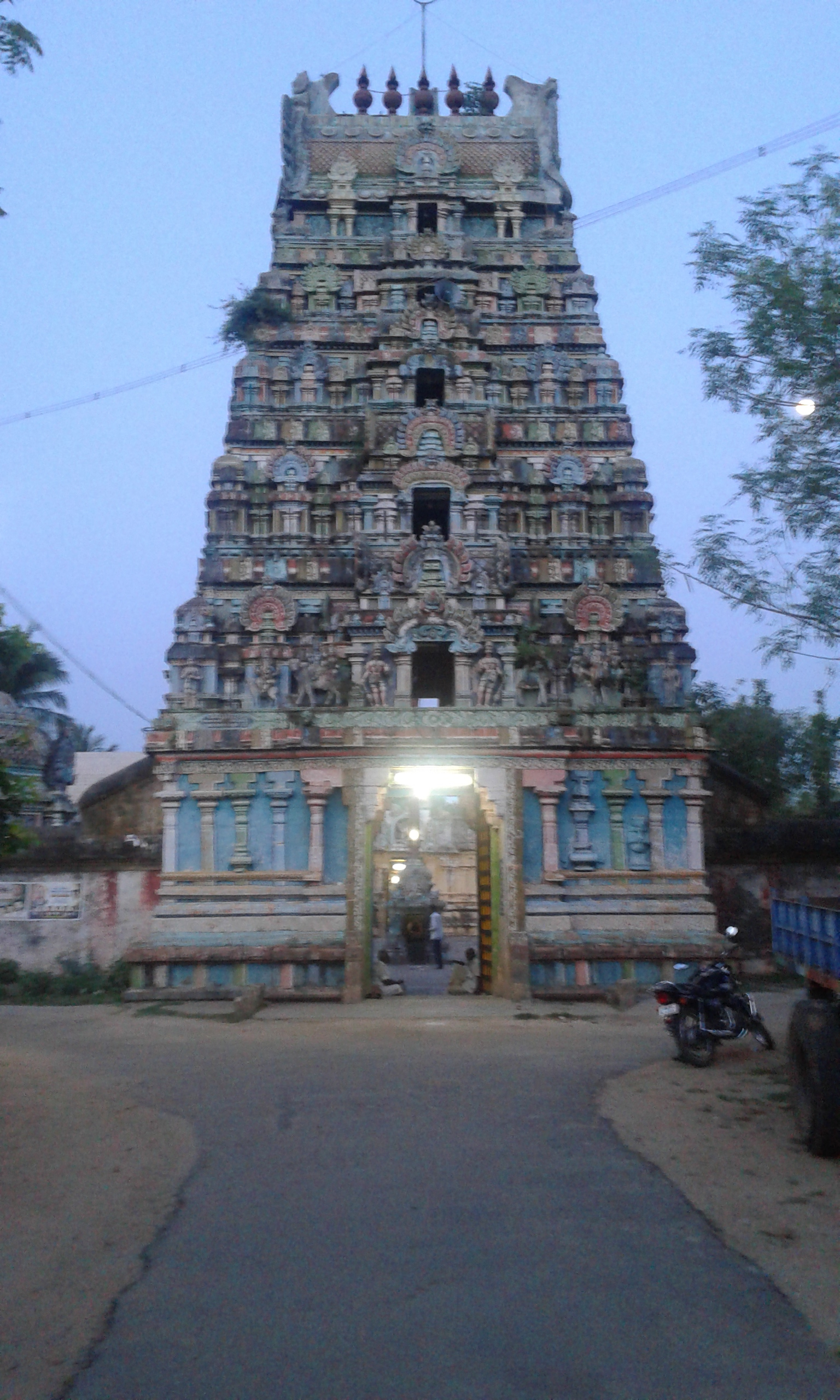

- Location in Tamil Nadu

Religion
- Affiliation: Hinduism
- District: Mayiladuthurai
- Deity: Vedapureeswarar Temple

Location
- Location: Therazhundur, near Kuttalam
- State: Tamil Nadu
- Country: India
- Coordinates: 11.04°N 79.58°E

Architecture
- Type: Dravidian architecture

Therazhundur Vedapureeswarar Temple is a Hindu temple located at Therazhundur in Mayiladuthurai district of Tamil Nadu, India. The historical name of the place is Thirunedungalam. The presiding deity is Shiva. He is called as Vedapureeswarar. His consort is known as Soundaraambigai. At the right side of the temple, Madesvarar shrine is found.

The Archaeological Survey of India (ASI) has recently documented a set of inscriptions dating to the period of the Imperial Cholas at this temple. Two Tamil inscriptions, engraved on the door jamb and written in 12th-century script, are dated to the 34th and 44th regnal years of Kulottunga Chola I.

== Significance ==
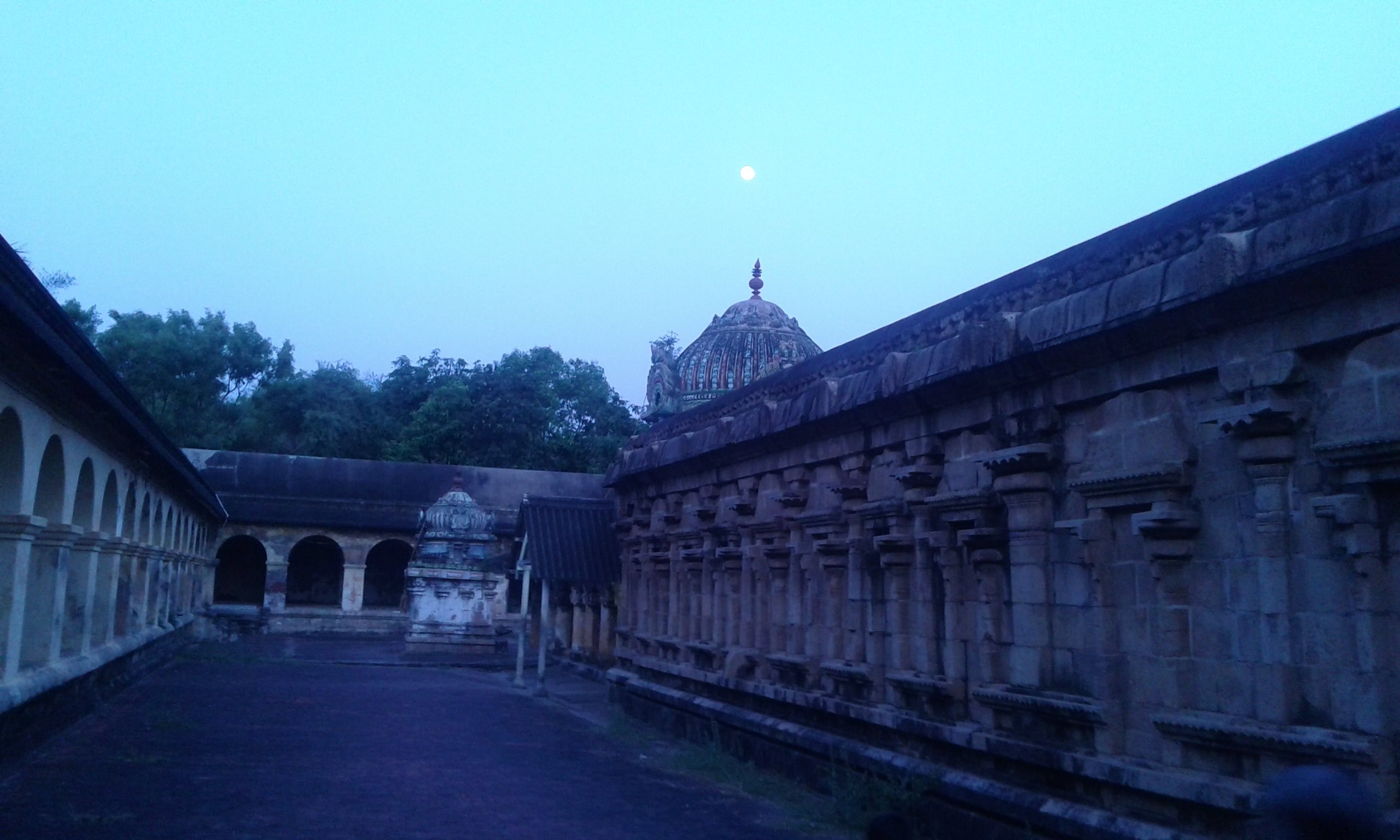
Premises of Vedapureeswarar Temple

It is one of the shrines of the 275 Paadal Petra Sthalams - Shiva Sthalams glorified in the early medieval Tevaram poems by Tamil Saivite Nayanar Tirugnanasambandar. The temple is counted as one of the temples built on the banks of River Kaveri.

== Literary Mention ==
Tirugnanasambandar describes the feature of the deity as:

பெரியாய் சிறியாய் பிறையாய் மிடறு

கரியாய் கரிகா டுயர்வீ டுடையாய்
அரியாய் ஒளியாய் அழுந்தை மறையோர்

வெரியார் தொழமா மடம்மே வினையே.

== Gallery ==
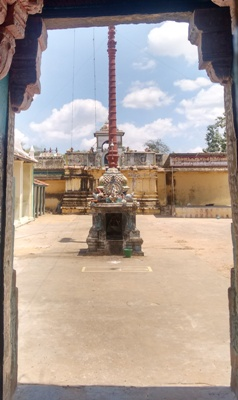
Flagpost and Vinayaka

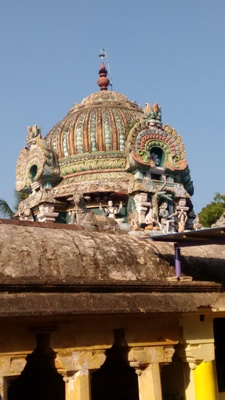
Vimana of presiding deity

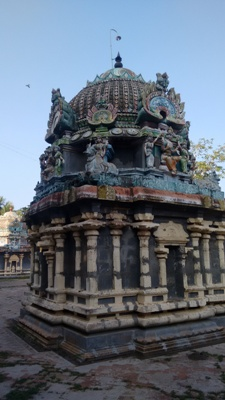
Vimana of goddess

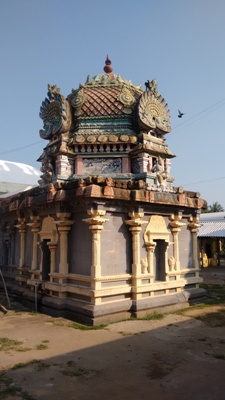
Madesvarar shrine
