= Kudavasal =

Kudavasal Kodavasal
- Town
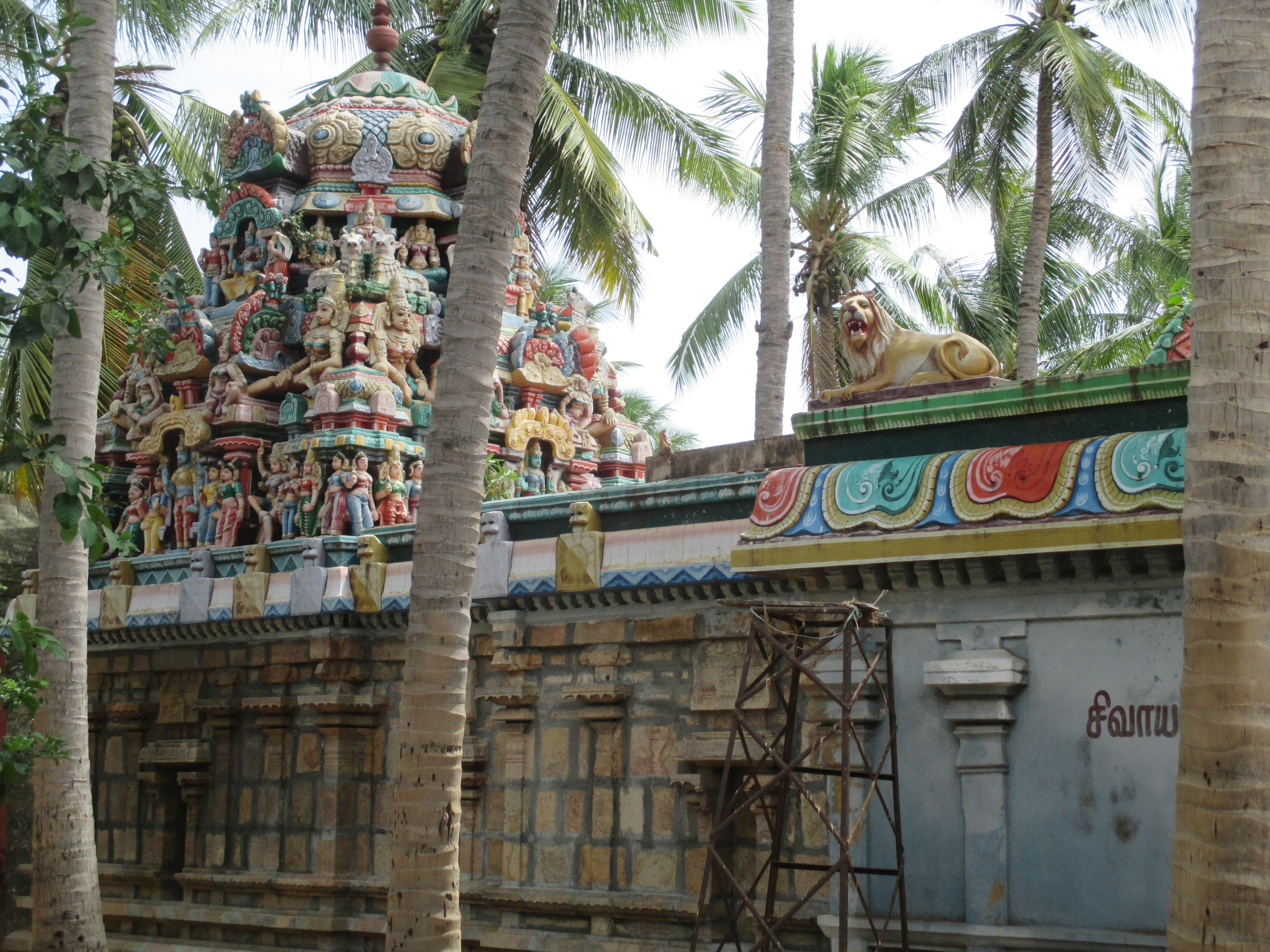
- Kudavasal Temple

- Location in Tamil Nadu, India
- Coordinates: 10°52′20″N 79°29′09″E
- Country: India
- State: Tamil Nadu
- District: Thiruvarur
- Taluk: Kudavasal

Population (2001)
  - Total: 13,247

Languages
  - Official: Tamil
- Time zone: UTC+5:30 (IST)
- Postal code: 610107
- Vehicle registration: TN:50

Kudavasal or Kodavasal is a panchayat in Thiruvarur district in the Indian state of Tamil Nadu. The town is the headquarters of Kudavasal taluk.

== Demographics ==
As of the 2001 Indian census, Kudavasal had a population of 13,500. Males constituted 49% of the population and females 51%. Kudavasal has a literacy rate of 72%, higher than the national average of 59.5%. The male literacy rate is 78%, and the female rate is 66%. In Kudavasal, 10% of the population is under 6 years of age.

Located at the heart of the Cauvery delta, Kudavasal was a prominent settlement during medieval times. Brahmin scholars migrating from the north of India to the Chola kingdom lived here. There are multiple Shaivite temples here including Koneswarar Temple, and multiple Vaishnavite temples including the Srinivasa Perumal Temple and Varadharaja Perumal temple at Kodavasal. Post-independence migration trends have seen native populations move to urban centers like Chennai, with subsequent settlement by the Muslim population resulting in a dramatic demographic shift.
