= Dharmapuram Adheenam =

Hindu monastery in Mayiladuthurai district, Tamil Nadu, India

Dharumapuram Adheenam
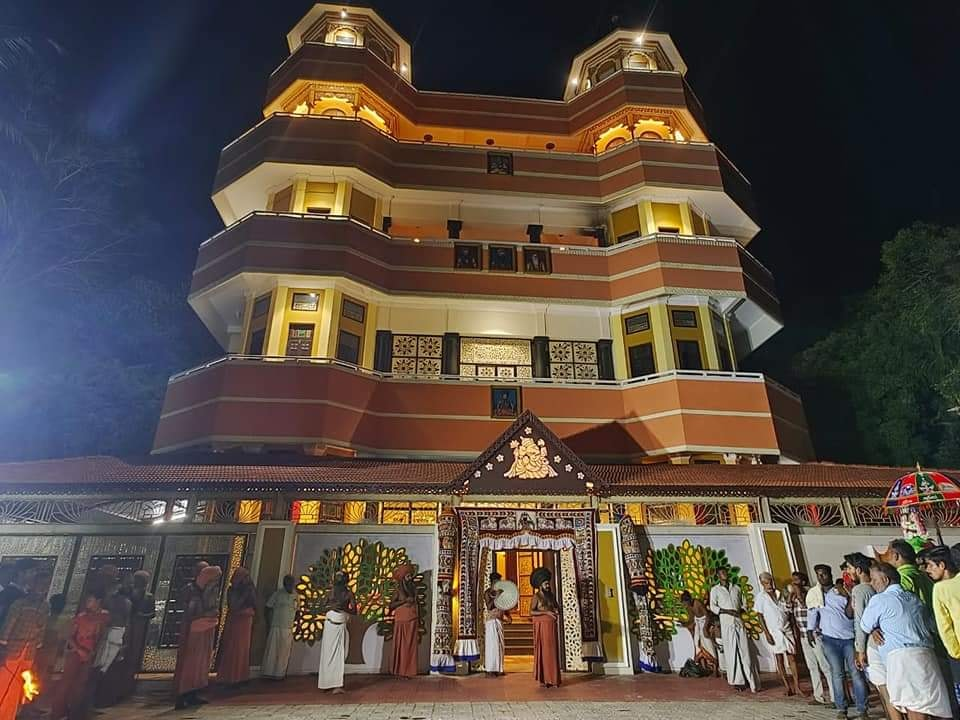
- Dharumapuram Adheenam headquarters
- Founder: Guru Gnanasambhandhar
- Type: Religious
- Location: Mayiladuthurai, Tamil Nadu, India
- Coordinates: 11.1041°N 79.6733°E
- First Adheenam: Guru Gnanasambhandhar
- Present Adheenam: Sri Masillamani Desiga Gnanasambanda Parmachariya Swamigal
- Affiliations: Hinduism, Shaivism
- Website: https://dharumaiadheenam.in/

Dharumapuram Adheenam (Tamil: தருமை ஆதீனம்) is a Saivite monastic institution based in the town of Mayiladuthurai, Tamil Nadu. As of 2019, there were a total of 27 Shiva temples under the control of the adheenam.

== History and activities ==
The adheenam was founded during the 16th century, along with the Thiruvaduthurai Adheenam and the Thiruppanandal Adheenam, to spread the ideology of Saiva Sidhantham. Dharumapuram mutt was founded by Thirugnana Sambanthar.

The adheenam is involved in publishing Saivite literature, specifically the Thevaram and Tiruvasakam and its translations. It is also involved in literary scholarship. Vaitheeswaran Koil, near Sirkazhi, is one of the temples the adheenam maintains.

Arunachala Kavirayar a Tamil poet and a composer of Carnatic music in the 18th Century CE studied both Tamil and Sanskrit in this adheenam. The head of Mutt was so pleased with Kavirayar and even considered making Arunchala as his successor. At 18, Kavirayar left the Mutt and Later composed the Famous Opera on the Epic Ramayana called as Rama Natakam.

The 26th Guru Maha Sannidhanam died on 4 December 2019, and was succeeded by Sri Masillamani Desiga Gnanasambanda Swamigal as the 27th Guru Maha Sannidhanam of the adheenam.

== Temples under Dharumapuram Adheenam ==
- Vaitheeswaran Koil
- Thiruppanantaal Arunajadeswarar Temple
- Amritaghateswarar-Abirami Temple, Thirukkadaiyur
- Veerateeswarar Temple, Thirupariyalur
- Uthavedeeswarar Temple, Kuthalam
- Thirunanriyur
- Yazhmoorinathar Temple, Thiru Dharumapuram, Karaikal
- Aiyarappar Temple, Thiruvayyaru
- Manakuddi
- Karunkuilnathanpettai
- Uchiravaneswarar Temple, Tiruvilanagar
- Dharbaranyeswarar Temple, Tirunallar
- Swayambhunathaswamy Temple, Peralam
- Kampaheswarar Temple, Thirubuvanam
- Shivalokathyagar Temple, Achalpuram
- Veerateeswarar Temple, Tirukurukki
- Mayiladuthurai (Sri Kasi Viswanathar Temple)
- Vallalar Temple, Mayiladuthurai
- Mayiladuthurai (Kumara Kattalai)
- Mullaivananathar Temple, Thirumullaivasal
- Mahalingeswarar Temple, Thiruvidaimarudur
- Sattainathar Temple, Sirkazhi
- Uyyakondan Thirumalai Temple
- Thalagnayar
- Brahmapureeswarar Temple, Thirukkuvalai
- Thyagaraja Temple, Tiruvarur - Rajanga Kattalai
- Dharumapuram
- Dharumapuram (Gnanapuriswara Temple)
