= Tirukkollampudur Vilvaranyeswarar Temple =

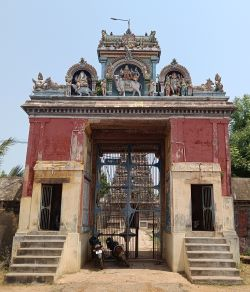

Religion
- Affiliation: Hinduism
- District: Tiruvarur
- Deity: Lord Shiva

Location
- Location: Tirukollampudur in Tiruvarur district
- State: Tamil Nadu
- Country: India
- Interactive map of Tirukkollampudur Vilvaranyeswarar Temple

Tirukkollampudur Vilvaranyeswarar Temple is a Hindu temple located at Tirukollampudur in Tiruvarur district, Tamil Nadu, India. The temple is dedicated to Shiva, as the moolavar presiding deity, in his manifestation as Vilvaranyeswarar. His consort, Parvati, is known as Soundara Nayaki. The historical name of the place is Koovilambur.

== Significance ==
It is one of the shrines of the 275 Paadal Petra Sthalams - Shiva Sthalams glorified in the early medieval Tevaram poems by Tamil Saivite Nayanar Tirugnanasambandar .

Pancha Aranya Sthalams: Aranyam means forest and the following five temples at different forests Thanjavur / Kumbakonam / Thiruvarur region are revered as “Pancha Aranya Sthalams”.

- 1. Sri Mullaivananathar Temple at Tirukkarugavur – Mullai vanam [SCN018]
- 2. Sri Satchi Nathar Temple at Avalivanallur – Paadhiri vanam [SCN100]
- 3. Sri Paathaaleswarar Temple at Thiru Aradaipperumpazhi (Haridwara mangalam) – Vanni vanam [SCN099]
- 4. Sri Aapathsahayeswarar Temple at Thiru Erumpoolai (Alangudi) – Poolai vanam [SCN098]
- 5. Sri Vilvavaneswarar Temple at Thirukollam Pudhur – Vilva vanam [SCN113]
