= Aridwaramangalam Padaleswarar Temple =

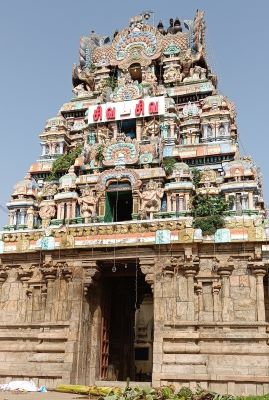
- Paathaaleswarar Temple, Aridwaramangalam, Tiruvarur district, Tamil Nadu

- Paathaaleswarar Temple, Aridwaramangalam, Tiruvarur district, Tamil Nadu

Religion
- Affiliation: Hinduism
- District: Tiruvarur
- Deity: Lord Shiva

Location
- Location: Aridwaramangalam
- State: Tamil Nadu
- Country: India
- Coordinates: 10.831747°N 79.350697°E

Architecture
- Type: Dravidian architecture
- Elevation: 51.15 m (168 ft)

Aridwaramangalam Padaleswarar Temple (அரித்துவாரமங்கலம் பாதாளேஸ்வரர் கோயில்) is a Hindu temple located at Aridwaramangalam in Tiruvarur district, Tamil Nadu, India. The temple is dedicated to Shiva, as the moolavar presiding deity, in his manifestation as Padaleswarar. His consort, Parvati, is known as Alankaravalli. The place is also known as Aradhai Perumpazhi.

== Significance ==
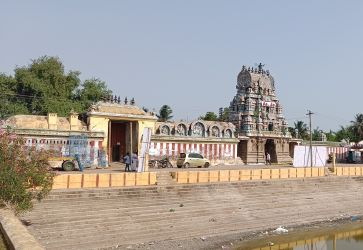
Temple entrance and the Temple tank

It is one of the shrines of the 275 Paadal Petra Sthalams - Shiva Sthalams glorified in the early medieval Tevaram poems by Tamil Saivite Nayanar Tirugnanasambandar.

Pancha Aranya Sthalams: Aranyam means forest and the following five temples at different forests Thanjavur / Kumbakonam / Thiruvarur region are revered as “Pancha Aranya Sthalams”.

- 1. Sri Mullaivananathar Temple at Tirukkarugavur – Mullai vanam [SCN018]
- 2. Sri Satchi Nathar Temple at Avalivanallur – Paadhiri vanam [SCN100]
- 3. Sri Paathaaleswarar Temple at Thiru Aradaipperumpazhi (Haridwara mangalam) – Vanni vanam [SCN099]
- 4. Sri Aapathsahayeswarar Temple at Thiru Erumpoolai (Alangudi) – Poolai vanam [SCN098]
- 5. Sri Vilvavaneswarar Temple at Thirukollam Pudhur – Vilva vanam [SCN113]

== Legend ==
This is one of the few temples where Shiva and Vishnu co-exist. Legend has it that just prior to his wedding with Parvati, Shiva went into hiding underground (Patala), just for fun. Vishnu, Parvati's brother, took the form of a boar and went in search for Shiva underground. Since Vishnu (Hari) created a door (Dwar) to go underground in search of the bridegroom Shiva, the name of this place became "Haridwara"mangalam. Since Shiva went and hid in Patala, the name of the main linga in this temple became Patala Eshwara. Shiva's consort at this temple is Parvati and the name of the devi is Alankaravalli. Unlike other Shiva temples, there is no special sannadhi for Durga here since Goddess Alankaravalli herself is believed to be a manifestation of Goddess Durga.
