= Kungiliya Kalaya Nayanar =

Kungiliya Kalaya Nayanar (also spelt as Kunguliya Kalaya Nayanar, Kungulia Kalaya Nayanar), also known as Kungiliya Kalaya (Kunguliya Kalaya), Kalayar (Kalaya, Kalayan), Kunguliya and Kalaya Nayanar, is a Nayanar saint, venerated in the Hindu sect of Shaivism. He is generally counted as the eleventh in the list of 63 Nayanars.

== Life ==
Kungiliya Kalaya Nayanar is regarded as a historical figure, evident from accounts where he played host to the Nayanar saints Appar (Tirunavukkarasar, 7th century), Sambandar (7th century), Siruthondar (Paranjothi, the army general of the Pallava king Narasimhavarman I, who ruled between 630–668 CE) and Nilanakkar (Tiruneelanakka).

The life of Kungiliya Kalaya Nayanar is described in the Periya Puranam by Sekkizhar (12th century), which is a hagiography of the 63 Nayanars. Kalaya was born in Tirukadavur (Katavur), presently known as Thirukkadaiyur, Nagapattinam district of the Indian state of Tamil Nadu. It was then part of the Chola kingdom. Thirukkadaiyur is famous for Amritaghateswarar Abhirami Temple dedicated to the god Shiva, the patron god of Shaivism and of Kalaya. Kalaya was a Brahmin, member of the priest caste and worked as a temple priest. Kalaya served Shiva by offering Him incense called Kungiliya, giving him the name Kungiliya Kalaya.

Shiva is said to be pleased with Kungiliya Kalaya's service, but decided to test his devotion. Over course of time, Kungiliya Kalaya's wealth diminished. He lost his money and possessions. He had to sell his properties to feed his starving family. However, he continued to burn incense sticks in Shiva's temple. When all valuables were sold, only his wife's gold thali (a necklace given by a groom to a bride in a Hindu wedding, which she wears as a sign of her marital status) remained. The wife removed her thali and gave it for Kalaya to sell and bring some rice for the family, even though it was considered inauspicious for a married woman to remove it. However, Shiva disguised as a Kungiliya merchant or hawker and asked if he wanted to buy the incense. Unmindful of his family's condition, Kungiliya Kalaya traded the thali for a bag of incense and went to the temple to burn it. The wife waited patiently and finally put the children to bed and prayed to Shiva. Shiva was pleased with the devotion of the couple and appeared in the dream of the wife and promised to restore their wealth. When she woke the next day, the house was filled with valuable objects. She sang a panegyric in honour of the Lord and prepared the meal and waited for Kalaya.

Shiva then appears before Kungiliya Kalaya - who had lost his senses and was immersed in devotion till then - in the temple and blesses him. He instructs him to return to his home and wife. Kungiliya Kalaya returned home to find his house transformed into a mansion with all wealth. Several devotees of Shiva gathered there. Kungiliya Kalaya served the devotees and distributed money amongst them.

Another tale associates Kungiliya Kalaya Nayanar with the Aruna Jadeswarar Temple, a Shiva temple in Thiruppanandal. The Nayanar wanted to visit the Thiruppanandal temple. The lingam (Shiva's aniconic symbol, generally worshipped as his form in the sanctum sanatorium of the temple) of this temple was bent. It was said that a female devotee called Thadaga was garlanding the lingam where her upper part of the sari slipped; she tried to garland the lingam with one hand while holding her sari by the other. Shiva bent his neck (shaft of the lingam), making it easier for her to garland the lingam. The lingam remained in the leaning posture since that day. Many tried to straighten the lingam, but failed. The Chola king, who was renovating the temple, was upset. The saint offered to help the king. He sang the Panchakshara mantra and offered Kungiliya incense to Shiva. He tied one end of the rope around his neck and other bend around the shaft of the stone lingam, at the risk being suffocated by the noose. He pulled gently and Shiva complied by making the lingam straight. The king became happy and rewarded Kungiliya Kalaya Nayanar with many gifts.

The hagiography says that after serving Shaivas for many years, Kungiliya Kalaya Nayanar attained Kailash, Shiva's abode on his death.

== Remembrance ==
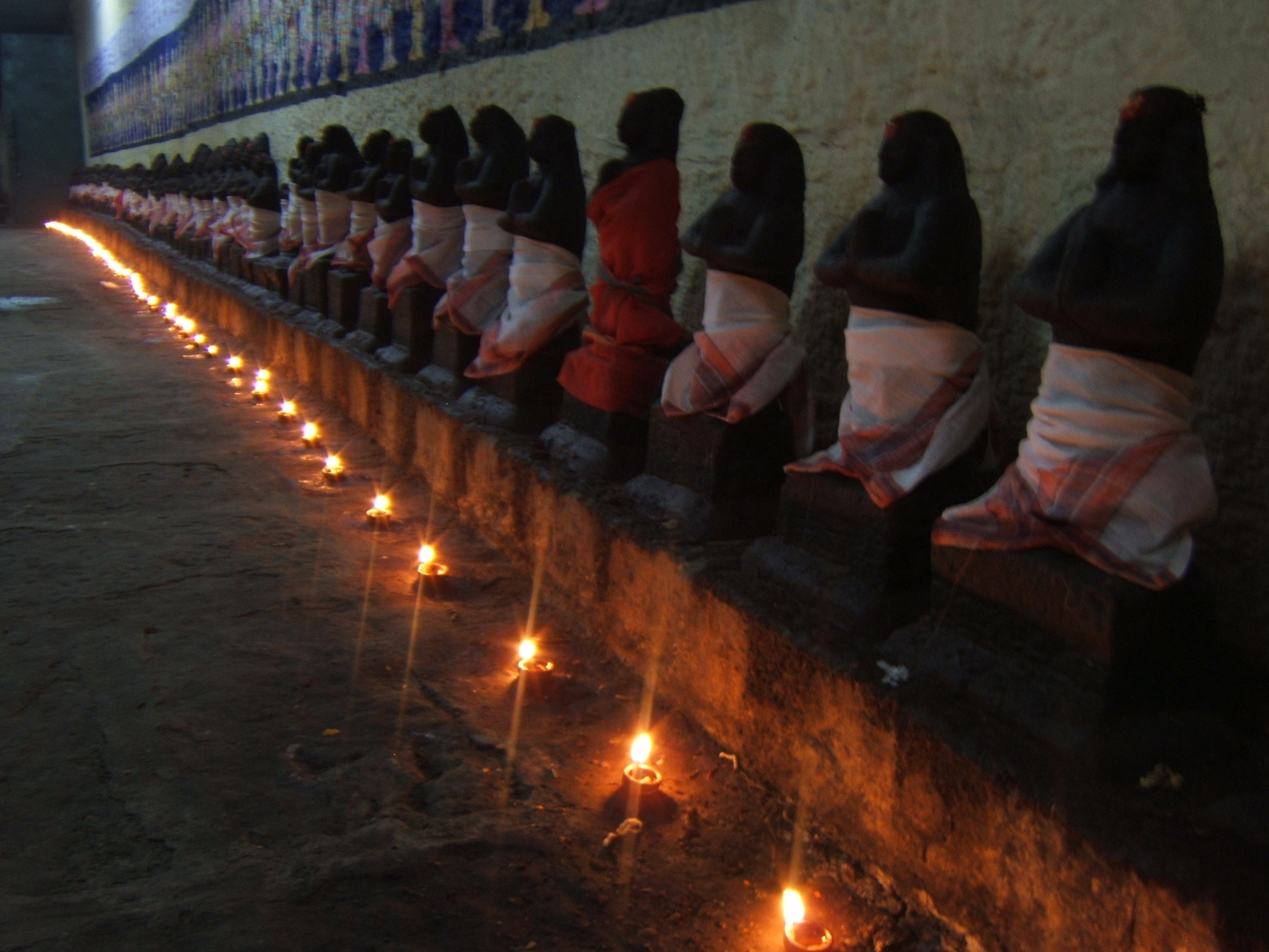
The images of the Nayanars are found in many Shiva temples in Tamil Nadu.

One of the most prominent Nayanars, Sundarar (8th century) mentions Kungiliya Kalaya Nayanar (called Kalayan of Katavur) in hymn to various Nayanar saints. When Sambandar met Kungiliya Kalaya Nayanar at Tirukadavur, he composed a hymn singing the glories of the latter.

Kungiliya Kalaya Nayanar is depicted wearing a crown, with folded hands (see Anjali mudra) and holding a club in the crook of his arm. A holy day in his honour is observed on the ninth day of the Tamil month of Avani, generally coincides with 25 August. He receives collective worship as part of the 63 Nayanars. Their icons and brief accounts of his deeds are found in many Shiva temples in Tamil Nadu. Their images are taken out in procession in festivals.
