= Tiru Nilakanta Yazhpanar =

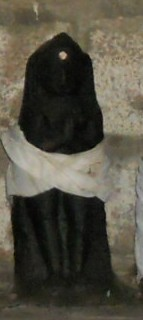

Personal life
- Born: 6th - 7th century CE Erukattanpuliyur, Chola Kingdom
- Died: 6th - 7th century CE Thirunallur, Chola Kingdom
- Spouse: Madhanga Soodamani
- Honors: Nayanar saint

Religious life
- Religion: Shaivism (sect of Hinduism)
- Philosophy: Shaivism, Bhakti

Tiru Nilakanta Yazhpanar was a Nayanar saint, venerated in the Hindu sect of Shaivism. He is generally counted as the sixty-first in the list of 63 Nayanars. While the first part of his name can be spelt as Tirunilakanta, Tirunilakantha, Tiru Neelakanta, Tiru Nilakanta, Nilakantan and Thiruneelakanda, Yazhpanar is spelt as variously as Yalppanar, Yalapannar, Yalpanar and Yazhpaanar. He is described as a companion of Sambandar (first half of the 7th century CE), one of the most prominent Nayanars.

== Life ==
The life of Tiru Nilakanta Yazhpanar is described in the Tamil Periya Puranam by Sekkizhar (12th century), which is a hagiography of the 63 Nayanars.

Tiru Nilakanta Yazhpanar was born in Erukattanpuliyur in the Chola kingdom. He belonged to the Tamil Panar community of wandering musicians. He was a staunch devotee of the god Shiva, the patron god of Shaivism. An maestro of the Yazh (a lute), he used to travel to various temples, as the bard of Shiva. However, as a travelling minstrel of a low caste, he was allowed to enter the temples and sang and played hymns to Shiva on the yazh, outside the entrance of the shrine. The name "Yazh-panar" denotes his job as the panar player of the yazh.

Once, Tiru Nilakanta Yazhpanar reached Madurai, which was ruled by the Pandyas. As usual, he sang and played the yazh outside the entrance of the Tiru-aalavai temple. In a dream, Shiva ordered the Brahmin priests to bring him inside the shrine as he wanted to listen to Yazhpanar's yazh. The Brahmins brought him to the garbhagriha (sanctum sanatorium) of the temple. A heavenly voice suggested that the Nayanar be a given a golden seat, so that the yazh is not placed on the wet temple floor. As ordered, a golden seat was presented to the Nayanar, who stood on it and sang the Lord's glories, playing his yazh.

Yazhpanar went to Thiruvarur and played the yazh outside the Thyagaraja Temple there. Thyagaraja, the presiding form of Shiva at Thiruvarur invited him in through the northern entrance, which the god opened for him. The Nayanar entered and played the yazh for Shiva.

Yazhpanar continued his journeys and visited many shrines. He finally reached Sirkazhi, home of the Sattainathar Temple and met the young Sambandar. The child saint requested Yazhpanar to play the yazh; the sonorous music won Sambanar's favour. Impressed by Sambandar's devotion, Yazhpanar asked him permission to accompany him and set tune to Sambadar's hymns to Shiva. Sambandar consented. Yazhpanar and his wife Mandangasulamani (described as virali or songstress) accompanied the young saint on his travels. The couple sang Sambandar's hymns and Yazhpanar composed music for the hymns on his yazh.

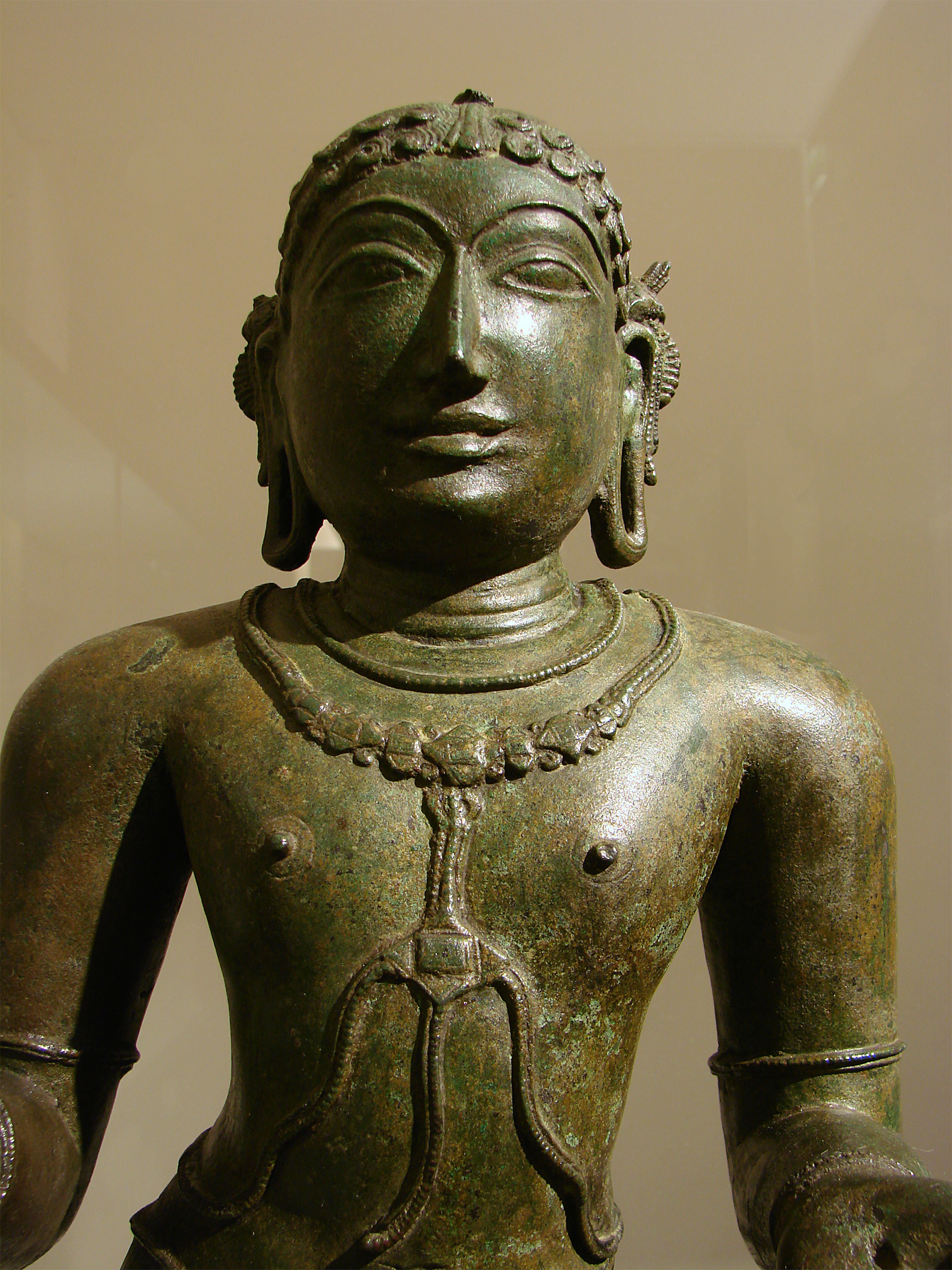
Tiru Nilakanta Yazhpanar travelled with Sambandar (pictured) and set music to many of the latter's hymns to Shiva.

The duo also visited Yazhpanar's home-town, Erukattanpuliyur and numerous other shrines of Shiva.

At Dharmapuram, the duo went to meet Yazhpanar's mother. The people of Dharmapuram praised Yazhpanar's music, but Yazhpanar credited Sambandar's hymns. Ultimately, Sambandar composed an hymn devoted to Shiva's son Ganesha, which Yazhpanar could not play on the yazh to his satisfaction. The frustrated yazh player decided to break his yazh, but was stopped by the lyricist, who said the musical composition was good enough and Yazhpanar should be content with it.

Yazhpanar accompanied Sambanar on his journeys and meetings with other Nayanars like Tiruneelanakka Nayanar, Siruthondar, Muruga Nayanar, Kungiliya Kalaya Nayanar, Appar, the Pandya king Koon Pandiyan, the queen Mangayarkkarasiyar and Kulachirai Nayanar. On a visit to the Brahmin Nayanar Tiruneelanakka, the caste-conscious host was uneasy inviting the Shudra (low-caste) couple of Tiru Nilakanta Yazhpanar and his wife home. After insistence by Sambanar, the host gave them place to sleep near the homa kunda, the fire altar used for sacrifices. The fire of homa kunda shone brightly in the night, giving testimony to the couple's devotion. After many pilgrimages, Tiru Nilakanta Yazhpanar and his wife returned to their home-town.

After a while, Sambandar invited Tiru Nilakanta Yazhpanar to his wedding in Thirumana Nallur (presently known as Achalpuram). After the wedding, Sambandar, his bride and the wedding party went the Shivaloka Thyagar temple of Shiva, in Thirumana Nallur. Sambandar prayed to Shiva, seeking salvation. Shiva appeared as a blazing flame and granted his wish. Then Sambandar, his bride and all the wedding guests, including Tiru Nilakanta Yazhpanar merged in the Light of Shiva.

== Remembrance ==
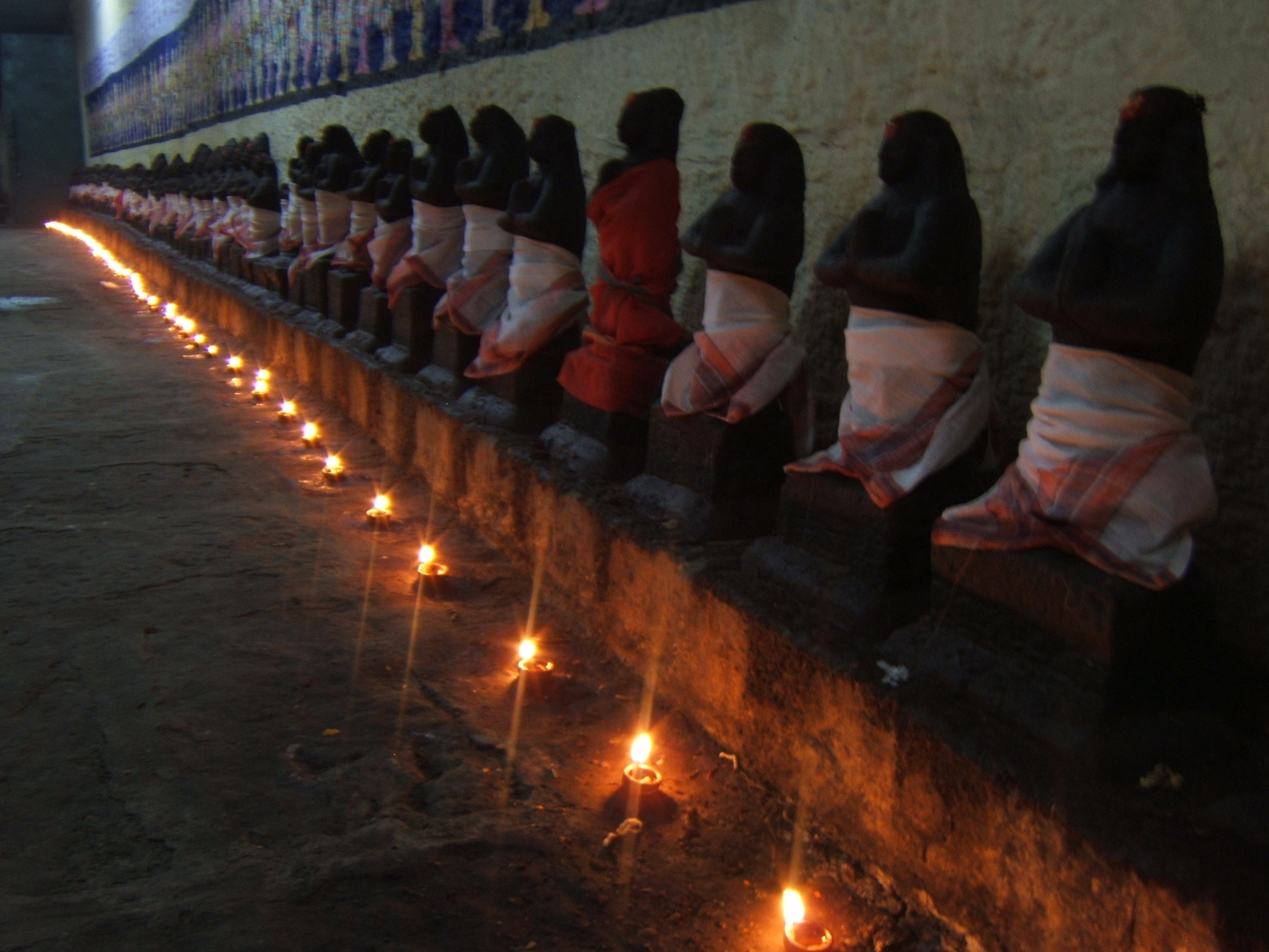
The images of the Nayanars are found in many Shiva temples in Tamil Nadu.

One of the most prominent Nayanars, Sundarar (8th century) venerates Tiru Nilakanta Yazhpanar in the Tiruthonda Thogai, a hymn to Nayanar saints, calling him the Tirunilakantan, the Panar player of the yazh.

Tiru Nilakanta Yazhpanar is worshipped in the Tamil month of Vaikasi, when the moon enters the Mula nakshatra (lunar mansion). He is depicted with a crown and folded hands (see Anjali mudra), and with the yazh or another lute in the crook of his arm. He receives collective worship as part of the 63 Nayanars. Their icons and brief accounts of his deeds are found in many Shiva temples in Tamil Nadu. Their images are taken out in procession in festivals.

Tiru Nilakanta Yazhpanar was the first to set music to the songs of a Nayanar and set a "precedent for musical performance of the Tevaram hymns". The Tevaram by Nambiyandar Nambi (11th century) compiles the hymns of Sambandar, Appar and Sundarar. However, the music of the Tevaram was lost, until Nambiyandar Nambi reached Tiru Nilakanta Yazhpanar's home-town to recover it. A Panar woman is said to have revealed it to him, which she got to know by a "divine revelation".
