= Thirukondeeswaram Pasupatheeswarar Temple =

Religion
- Affiliation: Hinduism
- District: Tiruvarur
- Deity: LordShiva

Location
- Location: Thirukondeeswaram in Tiruvarur district
- State: Tamil Nadu
- Country: India
- Interactive map of Thirukondeeswaram Pasupatheeswarar Temple
- Coordinates: 10°52′48″N 79°37′45″E

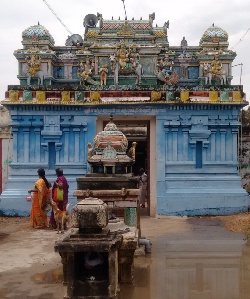
Entrance

Thirukondeeswaram Pasupatheeswarar Temple (Tamil: திருக்கொண்டீஸ்வரம் பசுபதீஸ்வரர் கோயில்) is a Hindu temple located at Thirukondeeswaram in Tiruvarur district, Tamil Nadu, India. The temple is dedicated to Shiva, as the moolavar presiding deity, in his manifestation as Pasupatheeswarar. His consort, Parvati, is known as Shanthanayaki.

== Significance ==
It is one of the shrines of the 275 Paadal Petra Sthalams - Shiva Sthalams glorified in the early medieval Tevaram poems by Tamil Saivite Nayanar Tirunavukkarasar.

== Literary mention ==
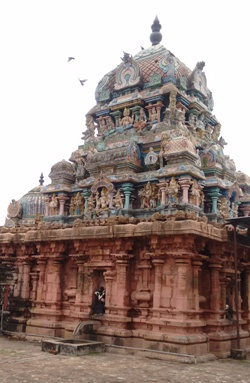
vimana

Tirunavukkarasar describes the feature of the deity as:

பொக்கமாய் நின்ற பொல்லாப் புழுமிடை முடைகொ ளாக்கை

தொக்குநின் றைவர் தொண்ணூற் றறுவருந் துயக்க மெய்த
மிக்குநின் றிவர்கள் செய்யும் வேதனைக் கலந்து போனேன்

செக்கரே திகழு மேனித் திருக்கொண்டீச் சரத்து ளானே.
