= Tiruthandalaineeneri Neenerinathar Temple =

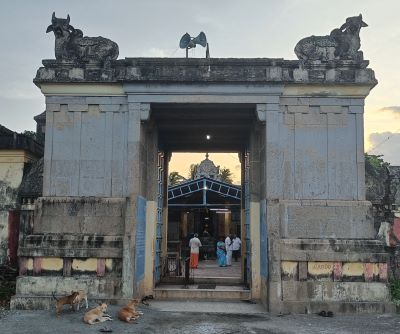

Religion
- Affiliation: Hinduism
- District: Tiruvarur
- Deity: Lord (Shiva),

Location
- Location: Thandalacherry in Tiruvarur district
- State: Tamil Nadu
- Country: India

Tiruthandalaineeneri Neenerinathar Temple is a Hindu temple located at Thandalacherry in Tiruvarur district, Tamil Nadu, India. The temple is dedicated to Shiva, as the moolavar presiding deity, in his manifestation as Neenrinathar. His consort, Parvati, is known as Gnanambikai. The historical name of the place is Tiru Thandalai Neel Neeri.

== Significance ==
It is one of the shrines of the 275 Paadal Petra Sthalams - Shiva Sthalams glorified in the early medieval Tevaram poems by Tamil Saivite Nayanar Tirugnanasambandar.
