= Araneri Achaleswarar Temple =

- Location in Tamil Nadu

Religion
- Affiliation: Hinduism
- District: Tiruvarur
- Deity: LordShiva, moolavar

Location
- Location: Tiruvarur
- State: Tamil Nadu
- Country: India

Architecture
- Type: Dravidian architecture

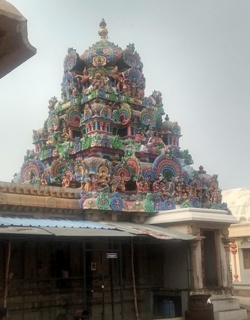
Vimana of Araneri Achaleswarar

Araneri Achaleswarar Temple (அரநெறி அசலேஸ்வரர் கோயில்) is a Hindu temple located in the premises of Thyagaraja Temple in Tiruvarur of Tiruvarur district, Tamil Nadu, India. Historical name of this place is Arur Araneri. The temple is dedicated to Shiva, as the moolavar presiding deity, in his manifestation as Araneriyappar. His consort, Parvati, is known as Vandarakuzhali.

== Significance ==
It is one of the shrines of the 275 Paadal Petra Sthalams - Shiva Sthalams glorified in the early medieval Tevaram poems by Tamil Saivite Nayanar Tirunavukkarasar.
