= Kumaragurupara Desikar =

Indian poet (1625–1688)

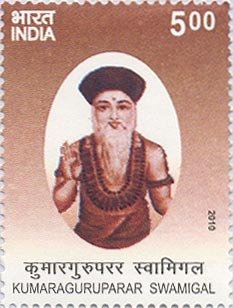

Personal life
- Born: 1625 Tiruvaikuntam, Madurai Nayak Kingdom (now in Thoothukudi District, Tamil Nadu, India)
- Died: 18 May 1688 (aged 62–63) Benares, Illahabad Subah, Mughal Empire (now Varanasi, Uttar Pradesh, India)
- Parents: Sivakama-Sundari (mother); Shanmukha Sikhamani Kavirayar (father)
- Notable works: Sakalakalavalli Maalai; Muththukkumaraswami Pillai Tamil; Tiruvarur Nanmani Malai

Religious life
- Religion: Hinduism
- Philosophy: Shaivism
- School: Dharmapuram Adheenam

Kumaragurupara Desikar (1625 - 18 May 1688) or Kumaraguruparar was a Saivite ascetic-poet connected with the Thiruppanandal Adheenam.

== Early life ==
Kumaraguruparar was born to Shanmukha Sikhamani Kavirayar and Sivakama-Sundari Ammaiyar in Tiruvaikuntam town in Tirunelveli district, Tamil Nadu. Until age five, he was unable to speak. When they visited Tiruchendur temple, he was blessed with speech. He sang Kandar Kalivenba in praise on Murugan. A few years later, he wrote Pillaitamizh in praise of the Meenakshi temple in Madurai. Soon afterward, he enrolled at the mutt at Dharmapuram where he began to study Sivava Siddhanta.

Childhood

Kumaraguruparar was born in Srivaikuntam in Tirunelveli District in Tamil Nadu. His parents - Sanmuka Sikamanik Kavirayar and Sivakama Sundhari Ammaiyar - did not have a child for long. They worshipped their beloved deity Lord Murugan of Thiruchchendur. By the grace of Lord Murugan, they gave birth to a boy and named him, Kumaraguruparar. Though they got the son, as a result of their devotion and prayers, the child did not speak until five years. The worried parents again took their pleading to the presence of the Lord of Thiruchchendur. Astonishingly, the child began to not just speak but started the speech by singing a composition at that young five years of age on Lord Murugan, called Kandhar Kalivenpaa. The austerities of all the previous births made him into a prodigy.

Early Wanderings

At a very young age Kumaraguruparar left his house in search of a guru who could kindle his spirit in the pursuit of God. In Thiruchendhur he heard a divine voice that his guru would be the one in whose presence he would be unable to speak well. In search of a guru, Kumaraguruparar came to Madurai, where the renowned Thirumalai Nayakkar was ruling. Thirumalai Nayakkar honored Kumaraguruparar in Madurai. He composed Meenatchi Amman Pillaiththamizh and sang the childhood of Goddess Meenatchi one stage a day. One day when he sang Varukaipparuvam Goddess Meenatchi Herself came as a young girl and bestowed Her grace by presenting a pearl garland to him. Kumaraguruparar sang Madhuraik Kalambakam, Meenatchi Ammai Kuram hailing the God and Goddess at Madurai. On the request of Nayakkar, he also composed a song-a book of ethics by the name Neethi Neri Vilakkam. He was venerated and treated respectfully at Madurai.

He went next to Thiruvarur, where he sang Thiruvarur Nanmanimalai rejoicing the grace of Lord Thyagarajar of that abode.

Meeting the guru

From Tiruvarur Kumaraguruparar moved to Dharumapuram, reaching where his mind was signaling about a great thing that was going to happen soon. This town hosts the renowned mutt of the Saiva Siddhantha tradition called Thirukkayilaya Paramparai Dharumapura Adhinam. The saint who was decorating the Presidency of the mutt was Masilamani Desikar. Arriving at the mutt, Kumaraguruparar paid his obeisance to the saint. Desikar asked Kumaraguruparar to explain the significance of the song from Periya Puranam - ain^thu pEraRivum kaNkaLE Kolla. This is the song that describes the state of Sundaramurthy Nayanar, as he saw the dance of Lord Shiva at Thillai. Who can tell the state of that great saint Sundarar as he saw to his ecstasy the Blissful dance of his beloved Lord! Sekkizhar has so beautifully described the union Sundarar achieved with God at that sight. Unless by utter stupidity one tries to talk about that glory beyond any words, how can it be explained at all?

Kumaraguruparar stood stunned. His words stammered. He realized that he was in front of the guru whom he has been searching for so long. He fell at the feet of Desikar and pleaded with him to initiate him into a life of renunciation. Desikar was not just a spiritually oriented person. He also had a concern for society. When spiritually getting elevated, shouldn't one become full of love for all the lives around? Desikar had realized the state in which Hinduism was getting crushed under the Mughal Empire with its barbaric intolerance towards Hinduism. He realized the need for the spiritually high, well-skilled, and devoted caliber like Kumaraguruparar to strengthen the Shaivite wisdom in the troubled lands. So he agreed to be the guru of Kumaraguruparar on the condition that he goes on pilgrimage to Kasi (Varanasi) and returns, subsequently, he would initiate Kumaraguruparar into sannyasa.

Initiation of Kumaraguruparar

Kumaraguruparar pleaded to Desikar that it would take a long time for him to complete the pilgrimage to Kasi (given the lack of facilities at that point in time). So Desikar waved off Kasi for the time being and asked him instead to stay at Thillai for a period of one Mandalam (48 days). Happily Kumaraguruparar agreed to that and proceeded to Thillaich Chirambalam (present Chidambaram Nataraja Temple). On the way, divinity called him to Vaiththeeshvaran koyil (Pullirukku Velur). There he sang Muththukkumaraswami Pillaith Thamizh.

Kumaraguruparar enjoyed the stay at Thillai worshipping the Dancing Lord. He composed on the God and Goddess Chidhambara Mummanik Kovai, Chidhambarach Cheyyut Kovai, Sivakami Ammai Irattai Manimalai. On his return, Desikar initiated him to the renounced life with saffron robes. Having given the initiation, Desikar stressed to him the importance of revitalizing Saivism in the northern part of the country where it was suffering from the oppression by the Muslim rulers. Now Kumaraguruparar agreed to go to Kasi.

The saint on a lion

It was about the year 1658 CE. Dara Shukoh(eldest son of Shah Jahan, who was killed by Aurangazeb) was the ruler of the Varanasi province of the Mughul Empire. Aurangazeb the most intolerant of the Moghul lineage was ruling at Inpdraprastham (Delhi). Dara was an exceptional one in the Mughals. He was tolerant enough to seek what the other religions had to say and encouraged discussions among the religions. He dealt with the scholars of the Hindu religion. He is said to have translated some of the Upanishads into the Persian language. For a long time before, successive Muslim invaders ruined the holy city of Kasi and demolished the abode of Lord Vishwanath. At this point, there was a critical urge to keep alive the spirituality of the suppressed Hindus.

On reaching Kasi, Kumaraguruparar sung Sakala Kalavalli Malai in praise of Goddess Saraswathi, praying to her to bestow the skill of words. The blessings of Vani came as a boon when he had to convince the opponents about the glory of Shaivism. He got to know the Hindustani language by Vani's grace. Kumaraguruparar wanted to meet with the Badusha, to establish a mutt in Kasi. Though Dara was fair with other religions, Kumaraguruparar had to cross many obstacles before he met Dara. The blessed saint, who had the valiance of spirituality, rode on a lion and went majestically into the court of Dara which frightened all the obstacle creators. Dara realized the spiritual power of saint Kumaraguruparar. He treated the saint with respect. Dara organized an inter-religious conference. He requested saint Kumaraguruparar to address the same. Kumaraguruparar accepted the invitation and he spoke fluently in Hindustani language explaining the greatness of the philosophy of Saiva Siddhanta. The audience was thrilled to know the glory of Shaivism. Dara bowed before the saint.

Establishing Kasi Mutt and Services

Dara asked him what he could do for him. What materials would the saint want, for whom only God matters? He asked the king to provide him with the land in Kasi where he would build a mutt and serve Saivism. The saint was given the option to choose a place of his choice for Dara. The saint wanted to renovate the Kedhar Eashwaraswamy Temple at the Kedharnath. The saint said that a kite (Garudan) would fly in the sky and the area it circles is the area that would be required to build the mutt. As prophesied a kite appeared in the sky and marked the area that included the Kedhar Eashwaraswamy Temple and the land nearby for building a mutt. Dara gladly gave that land for that purpose.

Kumaraguruparar renovated the abode of Kedhar Eashwara which was earlier ruined by the religious intolerants. In the Kumaraswamy Mutt that he built, he guided the people in the glory of Shaivite philosophy. His inspiring teachings the paved way for the restoration of the highly adored Lord Vishwanath and Lord Panduranga temples subsequently. The devotees offered many valuables to the saint. He took them to his guru at Dharumapuram. But Desikar refused to accept them and directed him to spend those for the spiritual development of the people of Kasi. As per that Kumaraguruparar spent the materials in spreading the message of Shaivism. He visited Dharumapuram four times to pay respect to his guru. It is said that Kumaraguruparar also gave discourses on Kamba Ramayanam and among those who got inspired by that was the famous Hindi poet Tulasidas, who wrote Ramcharitamanas. Kumaraguruparar stayed in Kasi for thirty years from 1658 to 1688 spreading the glory of Shaivism giving the vital support to Hinduism during those troubled times. He attained Samadhi at Kasi on the third day after full moon day in May 1688. His vital services for the sustenance of the Hinduism will be remembered along with his beautiful compositions by future generations.

Adoption of an ascetic lifestyle

Upon entering the Dharmapuram mutt, he made a detailed study of the system of Saiva Siddhanta and worked on improving his knowledge of Tamil. Convinced of his deep learning and sincerity towards leading an ascetic lifestyle, the heads of the mutt conferred upon him the title of "Tambiran".

He went to Kasi as insisted by his guru. There he spread the message of Saivism. He renovated the Kedareswar temple. He established a mutt in Kasi and until death he was present in Kasi.

On 27-June-2010, a commemorative postage stamp on him was released by the Indian Postal department.

== Literary contributions ==
His contributions are

- Sakalakalavalli Maalai – In praise of Saraswati
- Muththukkumaraswami Pillai Tamil – In praise of Murugan
- Tiruvarur Nanmani Malai
- Madurai Kalambakam and
- Meenakshi Pillai Tamil – In praise of Meenakshi
- Sivakami Ammai Irattai Mani Malai
- Chidhambara Cheyyul Kovai
- Kandar Kalivenba In praise of Lord Murugan

In all, Kumaraguruparar has composed 14 poems, the best of which, the Nidineri-vilakkam has been translated into English.
