= Avalivanallur Satchinathar Temple =

Hindu temple in Tamil Nadu, India

Coordinates: 10.831883°N 79.327415°E

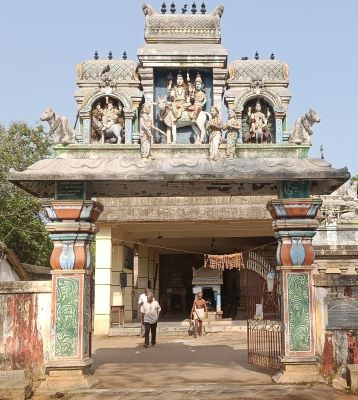

Religion
- Affiliation: Hinduism
- District: Tiruvarur district

Location
- State: Tamil Nadu
- Country: India
- Interactive map of Avalivanallur Satchinathar Temple

Avalivanallur Satchinathar Temple(அவளிவணல்லூர் சாட்சிநாதர் கோயில்) is a Hindu temple located at Avalivanallur in Tiruvarur district, Tamil Nadu, India. The temple is dedicated to Shiva, as the moolavar presiding deity, in his manifestation as Satchinathar. His consort, Parvati, is known as Soudnaranayaki.

== Significance ==
It is one of the shrines of the 275 Paadal Petra Sthalams - Shiva Sthalams glorified in the early medieval Tevaram poems by Tamil Saivite Nayanars Tirugnanasambandar and Sundarar.

Pancha Aranya Sthalams: Aranyam means forest and the following five temples at different forests Thanjavur / Kumbakonam / Thiruvarur region are revered as “Pancha Aranya Sthalams”.

- 1. Sri Mullaivananathar Temple at Tirukkarugavur – Mullai vanam [SCN018]
- 2. Sri Satchi Nathar Temple at Avalivanallur – Paadhiri vanam [SCN100]
- 3. Sri Paathaaleswarar Temple at Thiru Aradaipperumpazhi (Haridwara mangalam) – Vanni vanam [SCN099]
- 4. Sri Aapathsahayeswarar Temple at Thiru Erumpoolai (Alangudi) – Poolai vanam [SCN098]
- 5. Sri Vilvavaneswarar Temple at Thirukollam Pudhur – Vilva vanam [SCN113]
