= Tiruvusaattaanam Mandirapureeswarar Temple =

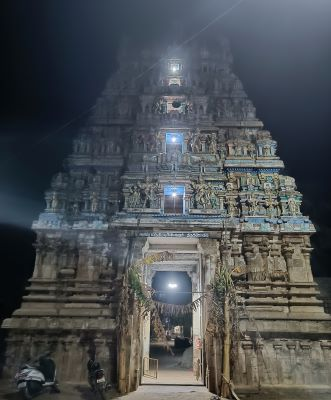

Religion
- Affiliation: Hinduism
- District: Tiruvarur
- Deity: Lord Shiva

Location
- Location: Kovilur in Tiruvarur district
- State: Tamil Nadu
- Country: India

Tiruvusaattaanam Mandirapureeswarar Temple is a Hindu temple located at Kovilur in Tiruvarur district, Tamil Nadu, India. The temple is dedicated to Shiva, as the moolavar presiding deity, in his manifestation as Mandirapureeswsarar. His consort, Parvati, is known as Periyanayaki.

== Significance ==
It is one of the shrines of the 275 Paadal Petra Sthalams - Shiva Sthalams glorified in the early medieval Tevaram poems by Tamil Saivite Nayanar Tirugnanasambandar.
