= Thoovanayanar Thoovainathar Temple =

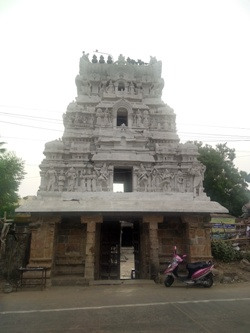
The entrance of the temple

Thoovanayanar Thoovainathar Temple is a Hindu temple located at Tiruvarur East Street in Tiruvarur of Tiruvarur district, Tamil Nadu, India. Historical name of this place is Arurparavaiyunmandazhi. The temple is dedicated to Shiva, as the moolavar presiding deity, in his manifestation as Thoovainathar. His consort, Parvati, is known as Panchin Mennadiyal.

== Significance ==
It is one of the shrines of the 275 Paadal Petra Sthalams - Shiva Sthalams glorified in the early medieval Tevaram poems by Tamil Saivite Nayanar Tirugnanasambandar.
