= Kizhvelur Kediliappar Temple =

Coordinates: 10.767574°N 79.740495°E

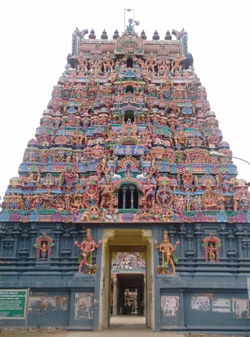
Main gopura

Keezhvelur Kediliappar Temple (கீழ்வேளூர் கேடிலியப்பர் கோயில்) is a Hindu temple located at Keezhvelur in Nagapattinam district, Tamil Nadu, India. The historical name of the place is Thirukeezhvelur. The temple is dedicated to Shiva, as the moolavar presiding deity, in his manifestation as Kediliappar. His consort, Parvati, is known as Vanamulai Amman.

== Significance ==
It is one of the shrines of the 275 Paadal Petra Sthalams - Shiva Sthalams glorified in the early medieval Tevaram poems by Tamil Saivite Nayanars Tirugnanasambandar and Tirunavukkarasar.

This temple is believed to be 1000 years or more older, based on the sculptures found in temple and notes from old Hindu literatures.

== Photogallery ==
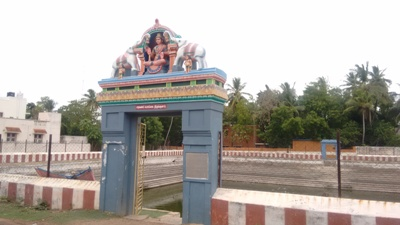
Temple tank

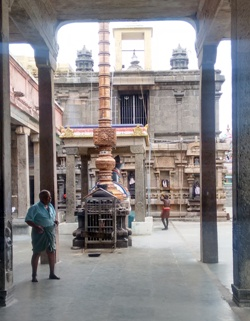
Flagpost

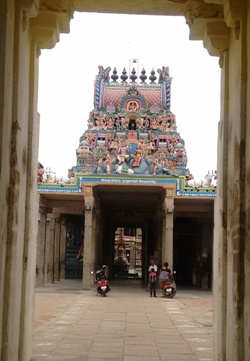
Front mandapa

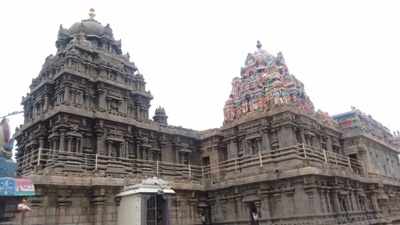
Shrine on raised platform

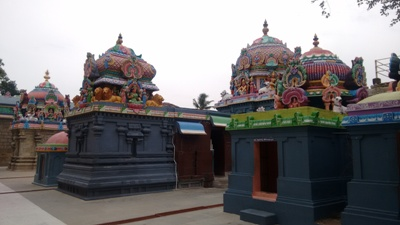
Shrines in the prakara

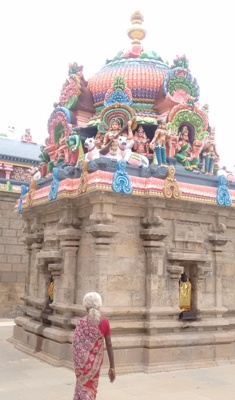
Amman shrine

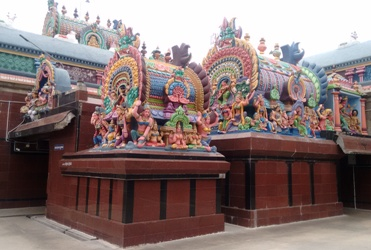
Anjuvattattamman shrine
