= Thiruthangur Vellimalainathar Temple =

Religion
- Affiliation: Hinduism
- District: Tiruvarur
- Deity: Lord Shiva

Location
- Location: Thiru Thangur in Tiruvarur district
- State: Tamil Nadu
- Country: India
- Interactive map of Thiruthangur Vellimalainathar Temple
- Coordinates: 10.6487°N 79.6258°E

Thiruthangur Vellimalainathar Temple is a Hindu temple located at Thiru Thangur in Tiruvarur district, Tamil Nadu, India. The temple is dedicated to Shiva, as the moolavar presiding deity, in his manifestation as Vellimalainathar. His consort, Parvati, is known as Perianayaki. The historical name of the place is Tiru Thengur.

== Significance ==
It is one of the shrines of the 275 Paadal Petra Sthalams - Shiva Sthalams glorified in the early medieval Tevaram poems by Tamil Saivite Nayanar Tirugnanasambandar.
