= Tirupalli Mukkudal Tirunethranathar Temple =

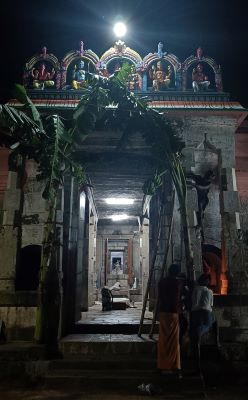

Religion
- Affiliation: Hinduism
- District: Tiruvarur
- Deity: Lord Shiva

Location
- Location: Tirupalli Mukkudal in Tiruvarur district
- State: Tamil Nadu
- Country: India
- Interactive map of Tirupalli Mukkudal Tirunethranathar Temple
- Coordinates: 10.7984°N 79.6572°E

Tirupalli Mukkudal Tirunethranathar Temple (Tamil: திருப்பள்ளி முக்கூடல் திருநேத்திரநாதர் கோயில்) is a Hindu temple located at Tirupalli Mukkudal in Tiruvarur district, Tamil Nadu, India. The historical name of the place is Kekkarai. The temple is dedicated to Shiva, as the moolavar presiding deity, in his manifestation as Tirunethranathar. His consort, Parvati, is known as Mayilmevum Kanni.

== Significance ==
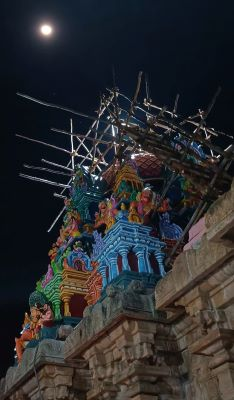
Vimana of the presiding deity

It is one of the shrines of the 275 Paadal Petra Sthalams - Shiva Sthalams glorified in the early medieval Tevaram poems by Tamil Saivite Nayanar Tirunavukkarasar.

== Literary mention ==
Tirunavukkarasar describes the feature of the deity as:

ஊனவனை உடலவனை உயிரா னானை உலகேழு மானானை உம்பர் கோவை

வானவனை மதிசூடும் வளவி யானை மலைமகள்முன் வராகத்தின் பின்பே சென்ற
கானவனைக் கயிலாய மலையு ளானைக் கலந்துருகி நைவார்தம் நெஞ்சி னுள்ளே

பானவனைப் பள்ளியின்முக் கூட லானைப் பயிலாதே பாழேநான் உழன்ற வாறே.
