= Pereyil Jagadeeswarar Temple =

Jagadeeswarar Temple
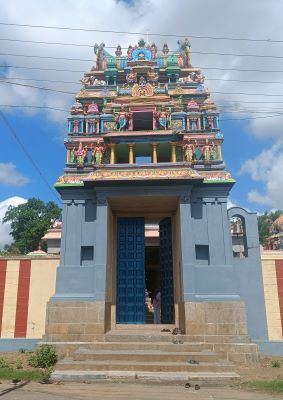

Religion
- Affiliation: Hinduism
- District: Tiruvarur
- Deity: Lord Shiva

Location
- Location: Tirukollampudur
- State: Tamil Nadu
- Country: India
- Interactive map of Jagadeeswarar Temple
- Coordinates: 10.8146°N 79.4600°E

Pereyil Jagadeeswarar Temple(பேரெயில் ஜகதீஸ்வரர் கோயில்) is a Hindu temple located at Tirukollampudur in Tiruvarur district, Tamil Nadu, India. The temple is dedicated to Shiva, as the moolavar presiding deity, in his manifestation as Vilvaranyeswarar. His consort, Parvati, is known as Jagan Nayaki. The historical name of the place is Pereyil.

== Significance ==
It is one of the shrines of the 275 Paadal Petra Sthalams - Shiva Sthalams glorified in the early medieval Tevaram poems by Tamil Saivite Nayanar Tirunavukkarasar.
