= Tirunellikka Nellivananathar Temple =

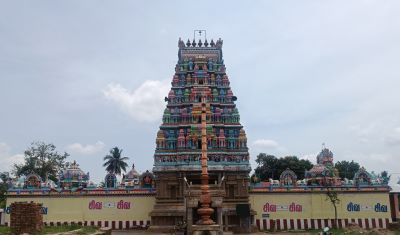

Religion
- Affiliation: Hinduism
- District: Tiruvarur
- Deity: Lord Shiva

Location
- Location: Tirunellikka in Tiruvarur district
- State: Tamil Nadu
- Country: India
- Interactive map of Tirunellikka Nellivananathar Temple

Tirunellikka Nellivananathar Temple is a Hindu temple located at Tirunellikka in Tiruvarur district, Tamil Nadu, India. The temple is dedicated to Shiva, as the moolavar presiding deity, in his manifestation as Nellivananathar. His consort, Parvati, is known as Mangalanayaki.

== Significance ==
It is one of the shrines of the 275 Paadal Petra Sthalams - Shiva Sthalams glorified in the early medieval Tevaram poems by Tamil Saivite Nayanar Tirugnanasambandar.
