= Vilamal Pathanchali Manoharar Temple =

Religion
- Affiliation: Hinduism
- District: Tiruvarur
- Deity: Lord Shiva

Location
- Location: Vilamal in Tiruvarur district
- State: Tamil Nadu
- Country: India
- Interactive map of Vilamal Pathanchali Manoharar Temple

Vilamal Pathanchali Manoharar Temple ( Tamil: விளமல் பதஞ்சலி மனோகரர் கோயில்) is a Hindu temple located at Vilamal in Tiruvarur district, Tamil Nadu, India. The temple is dedicated to Shiva, as the moolavar presiding deity, in his manifestation as Pathanchali Manoharar. His consort, Parvati, is known as Yazhinum Menmozhiyaal.

== Significance ==
It is one of the shrines of the 275 Paadal Petra Sthalams - Shiva Sthalams glorified in the early medieval Tevaram poems by Tamil Saivite Nayanar Tirugnanasambandar.

== Literary mention ==
Tirugnanasambandar describes the feature of the deity as:

தொண்டசை யுறவரு துயருறு காலனை மாள்வுற

அண்டல்செய் திருவரை வெருவுற வாரழ லாயினார்
கொண்டல்செய் தருதிரு மிடறின ரிடமெனி லளியினம்

விண்டிசை யுறுமலர் நறுமது விரிபொழில் விளமரே.
