= Veerateeswarar Temple, Korukkai =

Shiva temple in Tamil Nadu, India

Veerateswarar temple
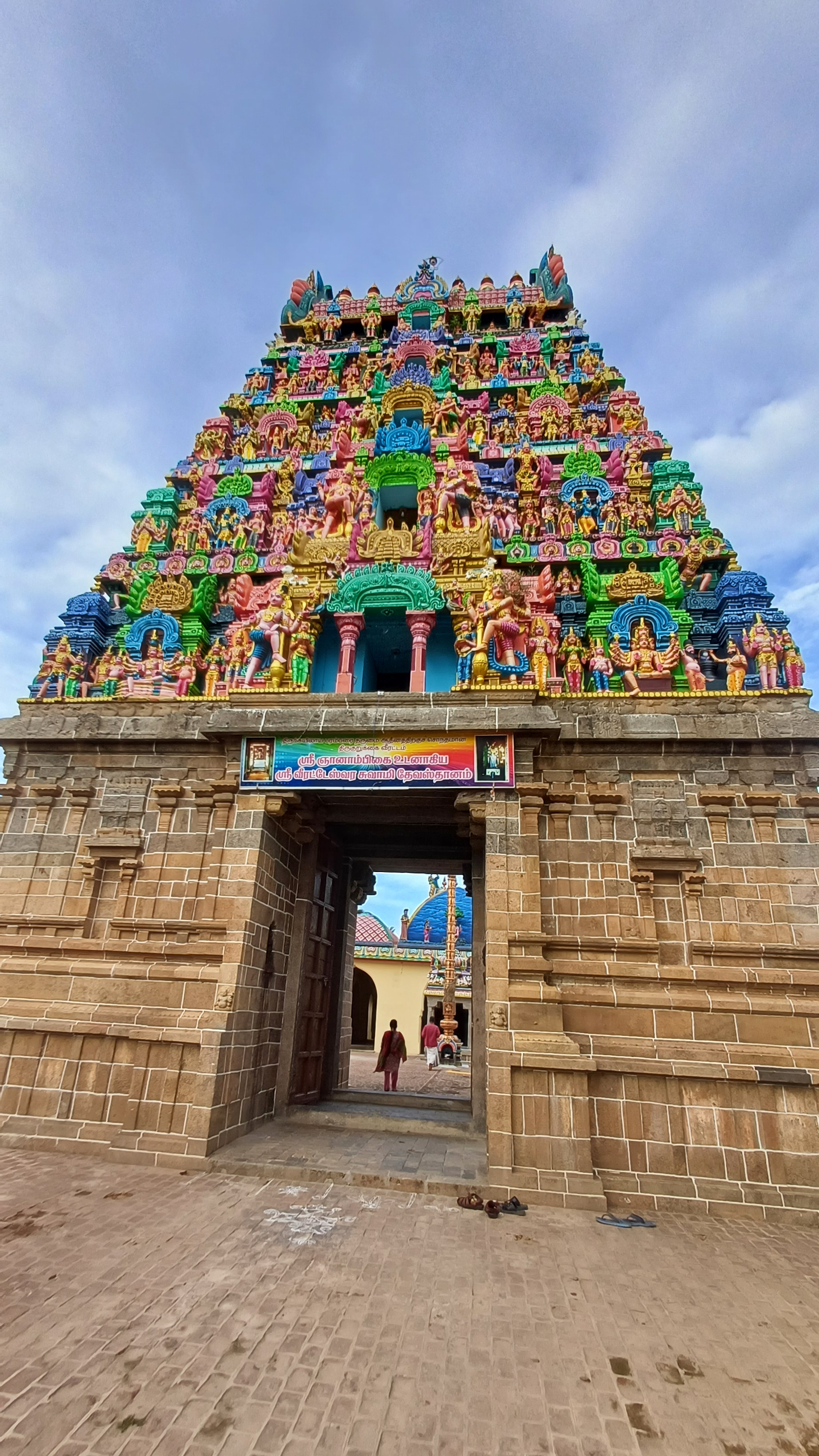
- Gopura of the Veerataneswarar Temple

- Location within Tamil Nadu

Religion
- Affiliation: Hinduism
- District: Mayiladuthurai
- Deity: Veerateeswarar (Shiva)
- Festival: Kamadahana

Location
- Location: Korukkai
- State: Tamil Nadu
- Country: India
- Coordinates: 11.155340°N 79.611976°E

Architecture
- Type: Dravidian

Veerateeswarar Temple (also called Korukkai Veerateeswarar temple) is a Hindu temple located at Korukkai in Mayiladuthurai district of Tamil Nadu, India. The presiding deity is Shiva in the form of Veerateswarar and his consort is known as Gnanambigai. The presiding deity is revered in the 7th century Tamil Saiva canonical work, the Tevaram, written by Tamil saint poets known as the nayanars and classified as Paadal Petra Sthalam, the 276 temples that find mention in it.

As per Hindu legend, Shiva is believed to have destroyed eight different demons and the eight Ashta Veeratanam temples are built signifying each of his victories. The temple is counted one of the eight where Shiva is believed to have punished Kama, the cupid.

The temple has four daily rituals at various times from 6:30 a.m. to 8:30 p.m., and few yearly festivals on its calendar. The present masonry structure was built during the Chola dynasty during the 9th century, while later expansions are attributed to Thanjavur Nayaks. The temple is maintained and administered by the Dharmapuram Aadhenam.

== Legend ==
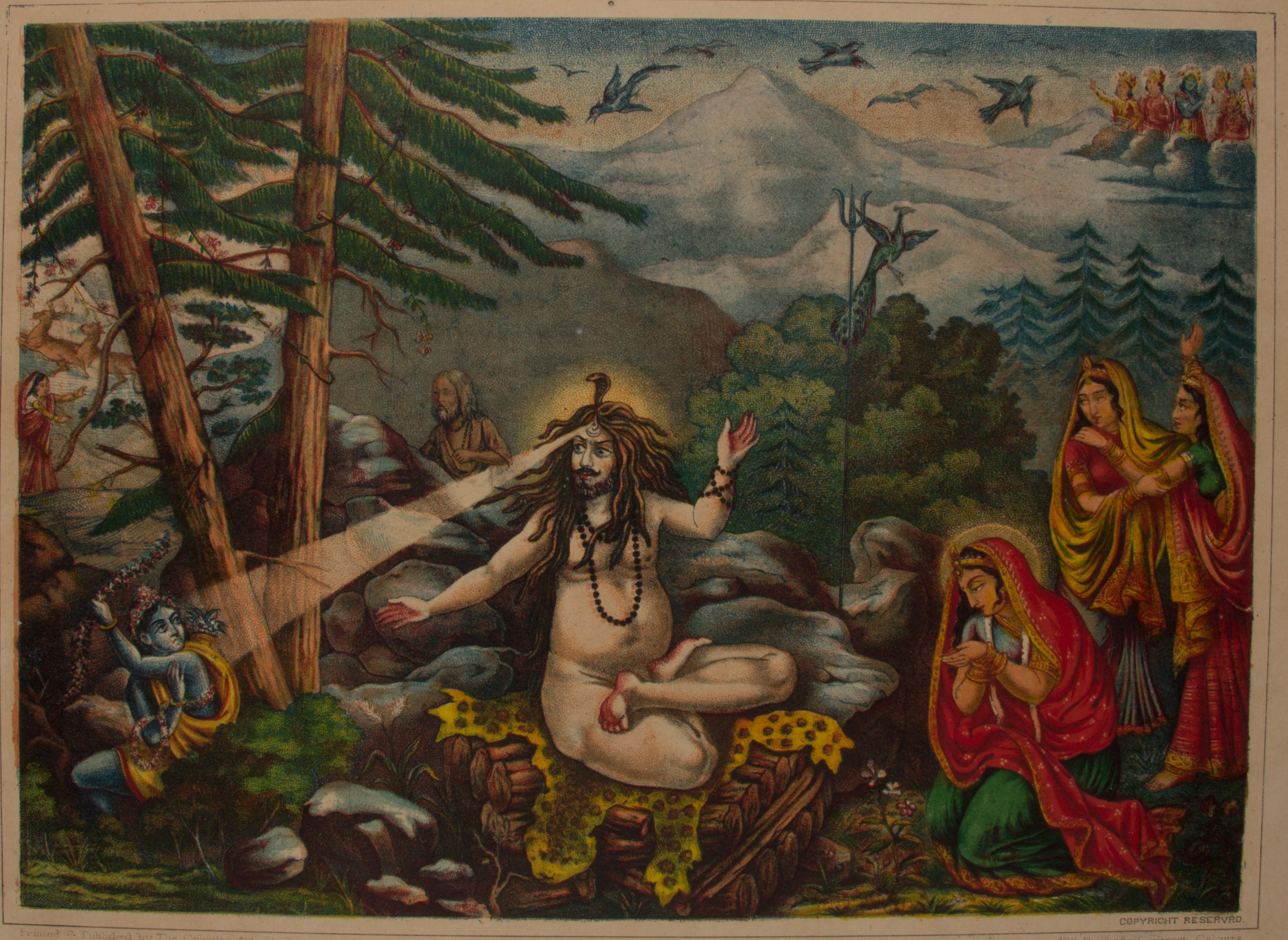
Legend of Shiva turning Kamadeva into ashes for disturbing his sacrifice

As per Hindu legend, Kamadeva, the cupid, was married to Ratī. One of the principal myths regarding Kama is that of his incineration by Shiva, the Kama Dahana. It occurs in its most developed form in the Matsya Purana (verses 227–255) but is also repeated with variants in the Shaiva Purana and other Puranas.Indra and the gods were suffering at the hands of the demon Tarakasura. Tarakasura obtained superior powers from Brahma from his severe penance. He could not be defeated by anyone except by Shiva's son. Brahma advised the celestial deities that Parvati should get an offspring from lord Shiva who would be able to defeat Taraka. Indra requested Kamadeva to break Shiva's penance. To create a congenial atmosphere, Kamadeva (Madana) created an untimely spring (akāla-vasanta). After he awoke Shiva with a flower arrow, Shiva, furious, opened his third eye, which incinerated Madana instantaneously and he is turned into ash. Lord Shiva agreed with Parvati's proposal and their pooja resulted the birth of lord karthikeya who defeated Taraka. Rati prayed to Indra, who along with celestial deities prayed to Shiva that it was under their request that Kama disturbed his penance. Shiva gave a boon that Kama would be reborn in Treta Yuga in the womb of Krishna's wife Rukmini as Pradyumna and marry Rati.

As per another legend, a sage named Theerthapahu, unaware of the power of Soola Theertham, the water body of the temple, prayed to bring water of river Ganga for his worship. His hands were shortened during the worship and after realising the mistake, he punished himself by hitting his head against a rock. Shiva was pleased by his devotion and cured his hand. He came to be known as Kurungai Munivar (meaning a sage with short hands in Tamil) and the place came to be known as Kurungai, which eventually became Korukkai. The place has other names like Kamadahanapuram, Kampakapuram and Yogeesapuram. It is believed that Vishnu, Lakshmi, Brahma and Muruga worshipped the Shiva at this place.

== Architecture ==
The temple is located in Korukkai, a village 3 km (1.9 mi) away from Needur in Mayiladuthurai - Manalmedu road. The temple faces the West and has a five-tiered rajagopuram. The temple tank, the Soola Theertham is located outside the main entrance. The sanctum houses the image of Veeratneeswarar in the form of lingam. The sanctum has ardhamandapa before it and a Mahamandapa, the worship hall. The Mahamandapa houses the metal image of Kamadahanamurthy sported with six hands holding six different weapons. There are metal images of Kamadeva and Rati. The images of Sanahathi sages are near the images of the presiding deity. The Mahamandapam also houses other metal image of Murugan, Somaskanda and Vinayagar. The shrine of Ambal in the form of Gnangmigai faces South. The image is sported in standing posture with four hands. The temple has two precincts and all the shrines in the temple are enshrined in rectangular granite walls. There is a hall called Sambuvinotha Sabhai (also called Kamanganasini Sabhai) which houses the images of Sivagami and Manikkavacakar. The temple is administered by Dharmapuram Adheenam.

== Religious significance ==
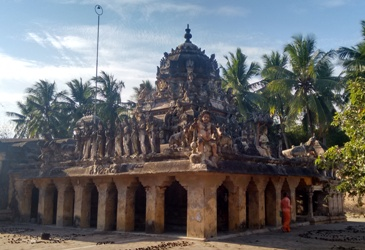
A major shrine in the temple

The temple is one of the Ashta Veeratanam temples that commemorate Shiva's eight acts of valour and fury where he became victorious over demons, heroes or divinities, and also as places where he is believed to have performed with fury.

It is one of the shrines of the 275 Paadal Petra Sthalams - Shiva Sthalams glorified in the early medieval Tevaram poems by Tamil Saivite Nayanar Tirunavukkarasar. The twelve songs of Appar are compiled in fourth Thirumurai as 49th and 50th canto. The thirty-one songs of Appar are compiled in the fourth Thirumrai ten each under 31st and 107th canto, while the remaining eleven in fifth Thirumrai under 11th canto. The ten songs of Sundarar are compiled in seventh Thirumurai in 28th cantor.

Tirunavukkarasar describes the feature of the deity as:

காப்பதோர் வில்லு மம்புங் கையதோ ரிறைச்சிப் பாரம்

தோற்பெருஞ் செருப்புத் தொட்டுத் தூயவாய்க் கலச மாட்டித்
தீப்பெருங் கண்கள் செய்ய குருதிநீ ரொழுகத் தன்கண்

கோப்பதும் பற்றிக் கொண்டார் குறுக்கைவீ ரட்ட னாரே.

The presiding deity is worshipped by devotees praying for mental and well-being.

== Festival and religious practices ==
The temple priests perform the pooja (rituals) during festivals and on a daily basis. Like other Shiva temples of Tamil Nadu, the priests belong to the Shaivaite community, a Brahmin sub-caste. The temple rituals are performed four times a day; Kalasanthi at 7:00 a.m., Uchikalam at 10:00 a.m., Sayarakshai at 6:00 p.m. and Ardha Jamam at 8:30 p.m. Each ritual comprises four steps: abhisheka (sacred bath), alangaram (decoration), neivethanam (food offering) and deepa aradanai (waving of lamps) for both Veerateeswarar and Gnanambigai. The worship is held amidst music with nagaswaram (pipe instrument) and tavil (percussion instrument), religious instructions in the Vedas read by priests and prostration by worshippers in front of the temple mast. There are weekly rituals like somavaram and sukravaram, fortnightly rituals like pradosham and monthly festivals like amavasai (new moon day), kiruthigai, pournami (full moon day) and sathurthi. There is a temple procession during the Tamil month of Margazhi (December- January) Thiruvadhirai festival. Kamadhahana festival during Masimagam during (February - March) followed by 10-day Brahmostavam are the major festivals in the temple.

== Idol Theft ==
Veenadhara (Cleveland Museum of Art)

The idol of Veenadhara Dakshinamurthy belonging to the temple is believed to be stolen and smuggled abroad sometime after 1959, when it was last seen during a record-keeping exercise by the French Institute of Pondicherry. The Idol Wing of the Tamil Nadu Criminal Investigation Department (IW-CID) has traced it to the Cleveland Museum of Art in the United States.

Another theft was reported in 2015, where a Nataraja idol was found to be missing from the night preceding July 14.

== Gallery ==
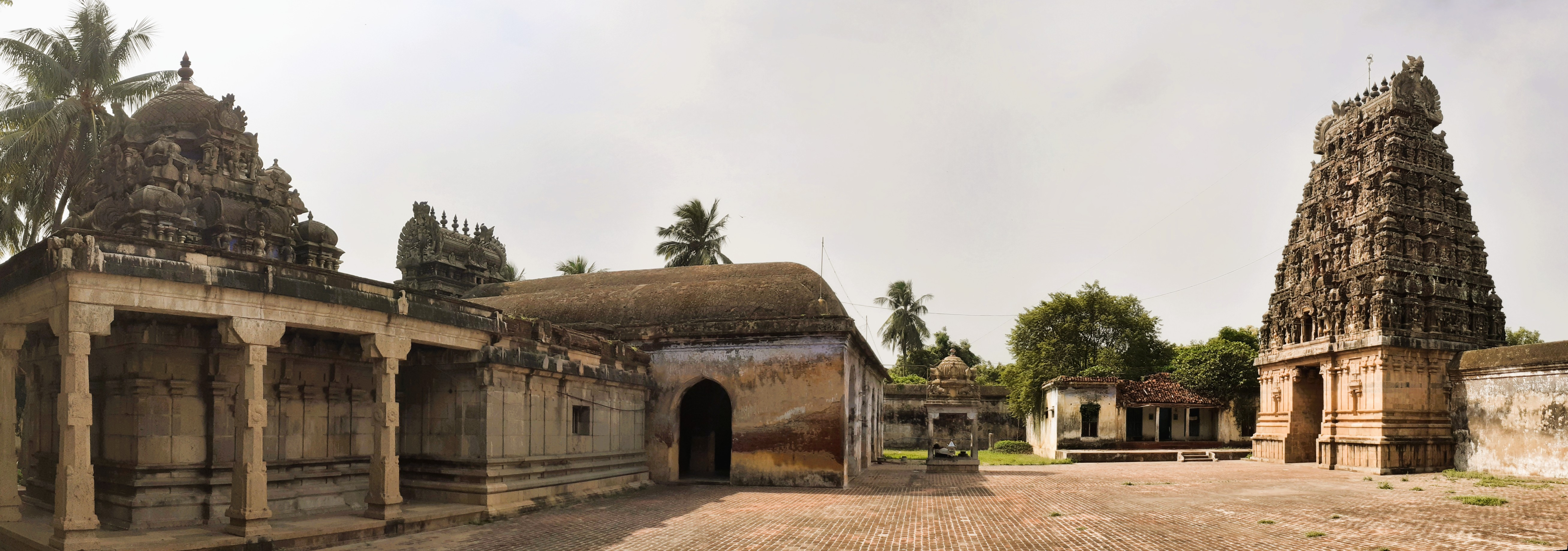
Panorama view

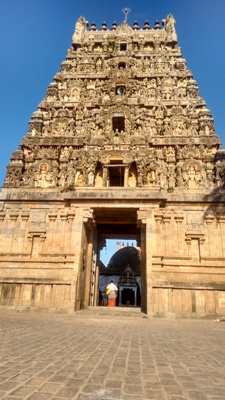
Gopura

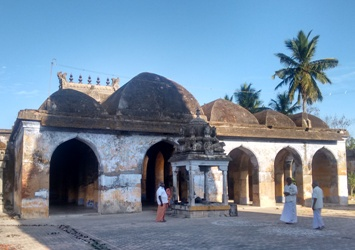

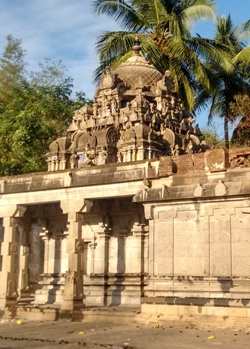

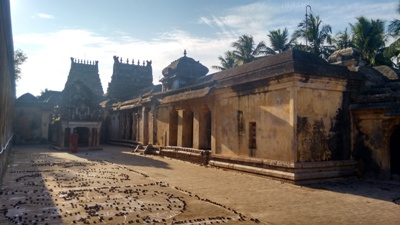

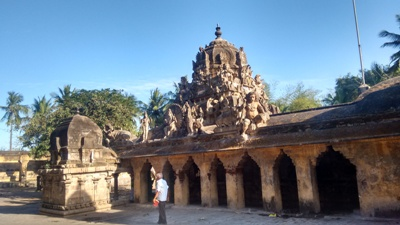

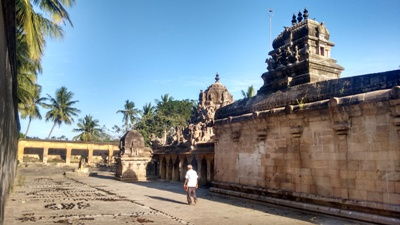

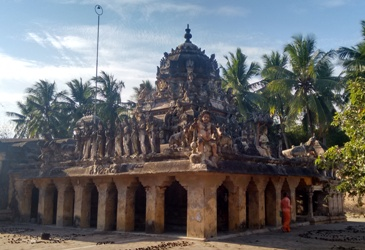

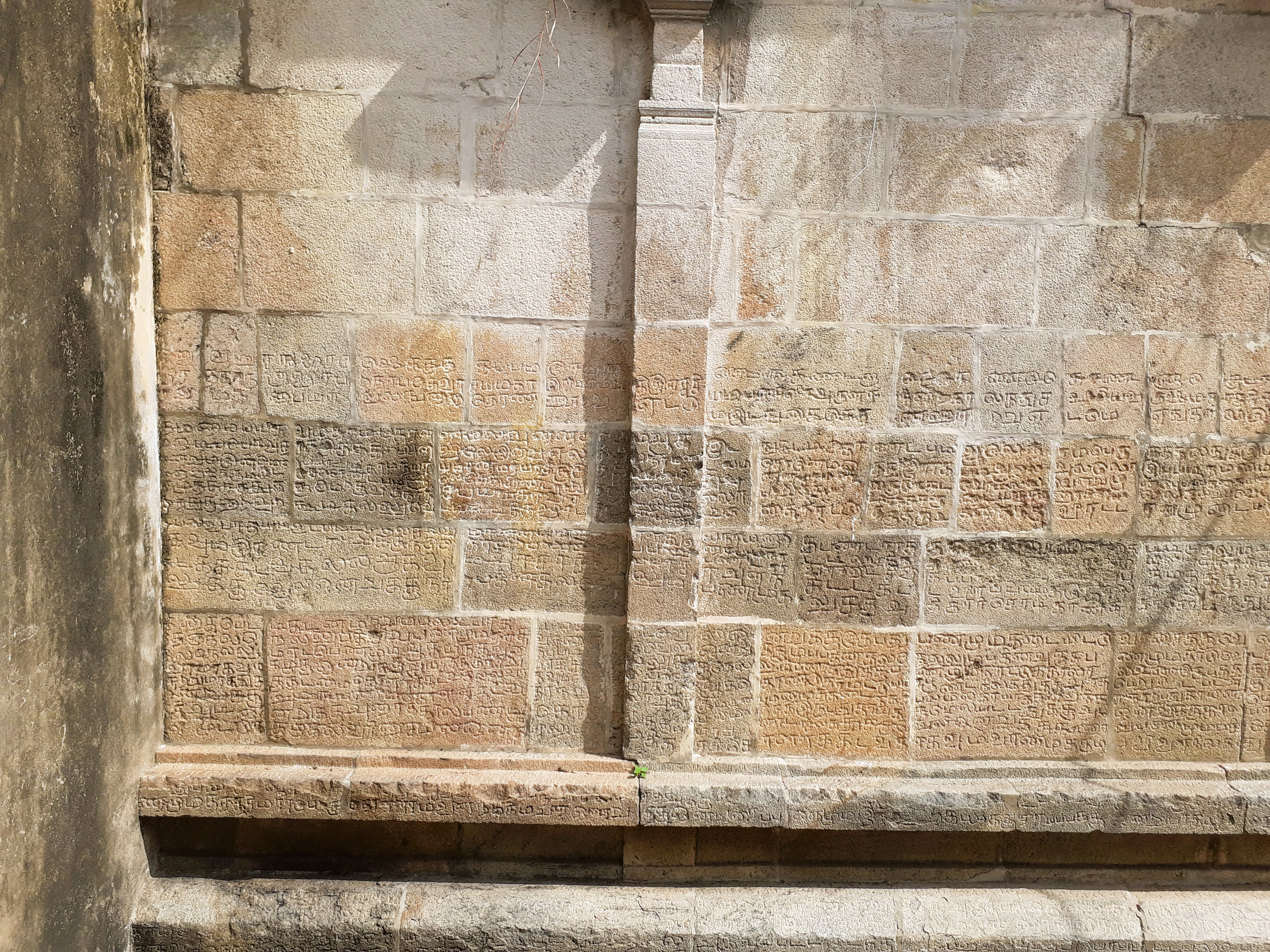

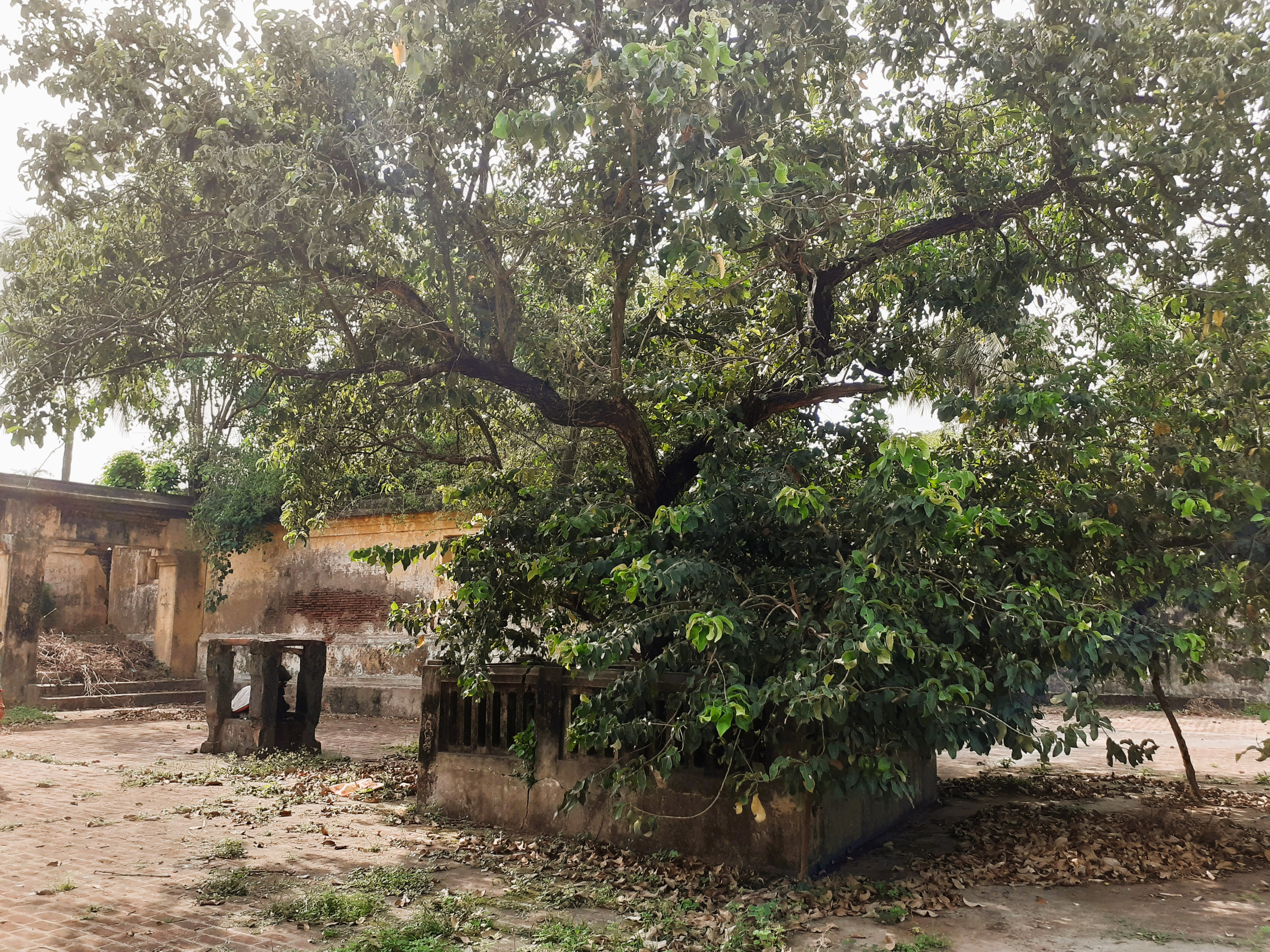

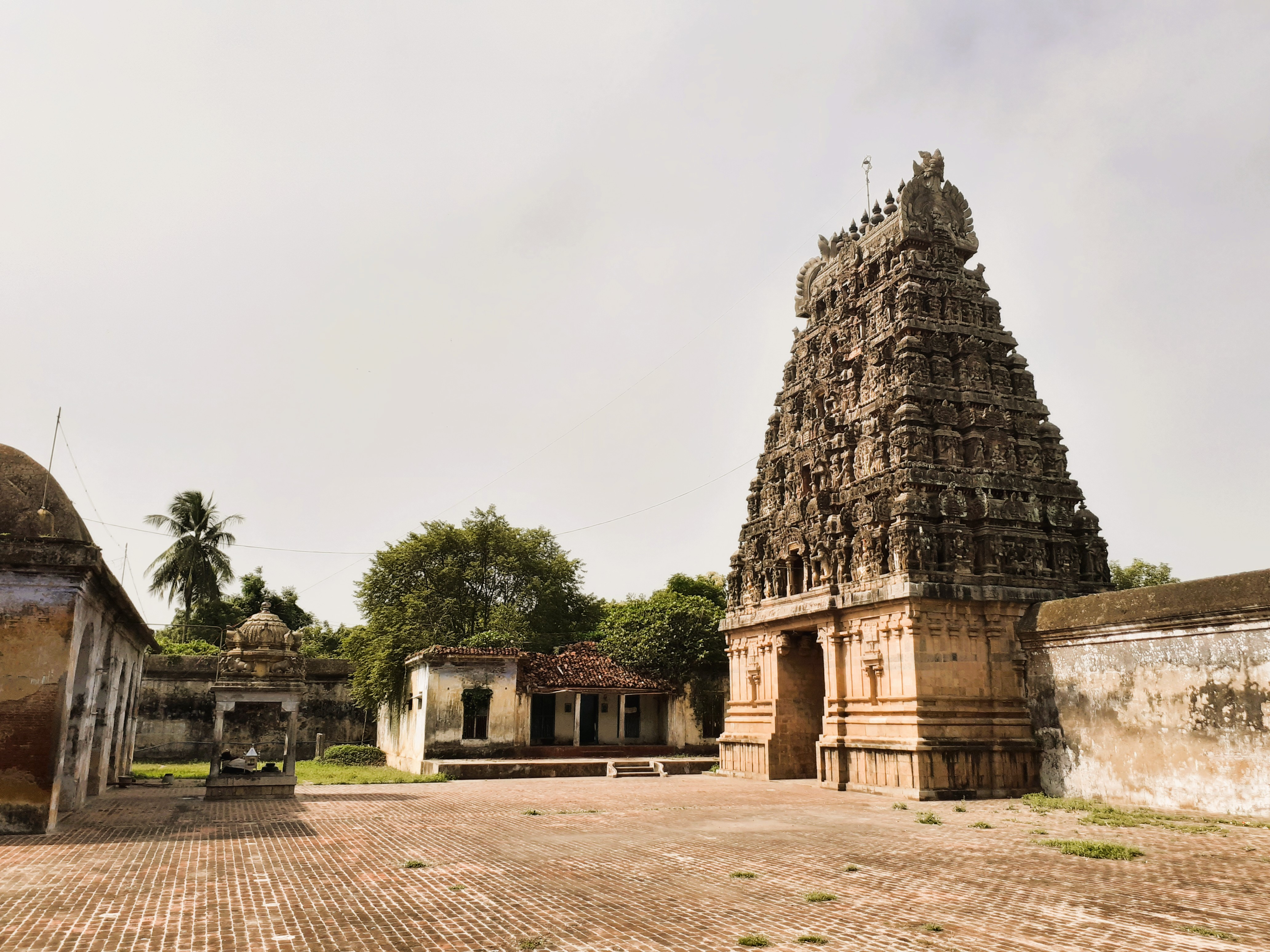

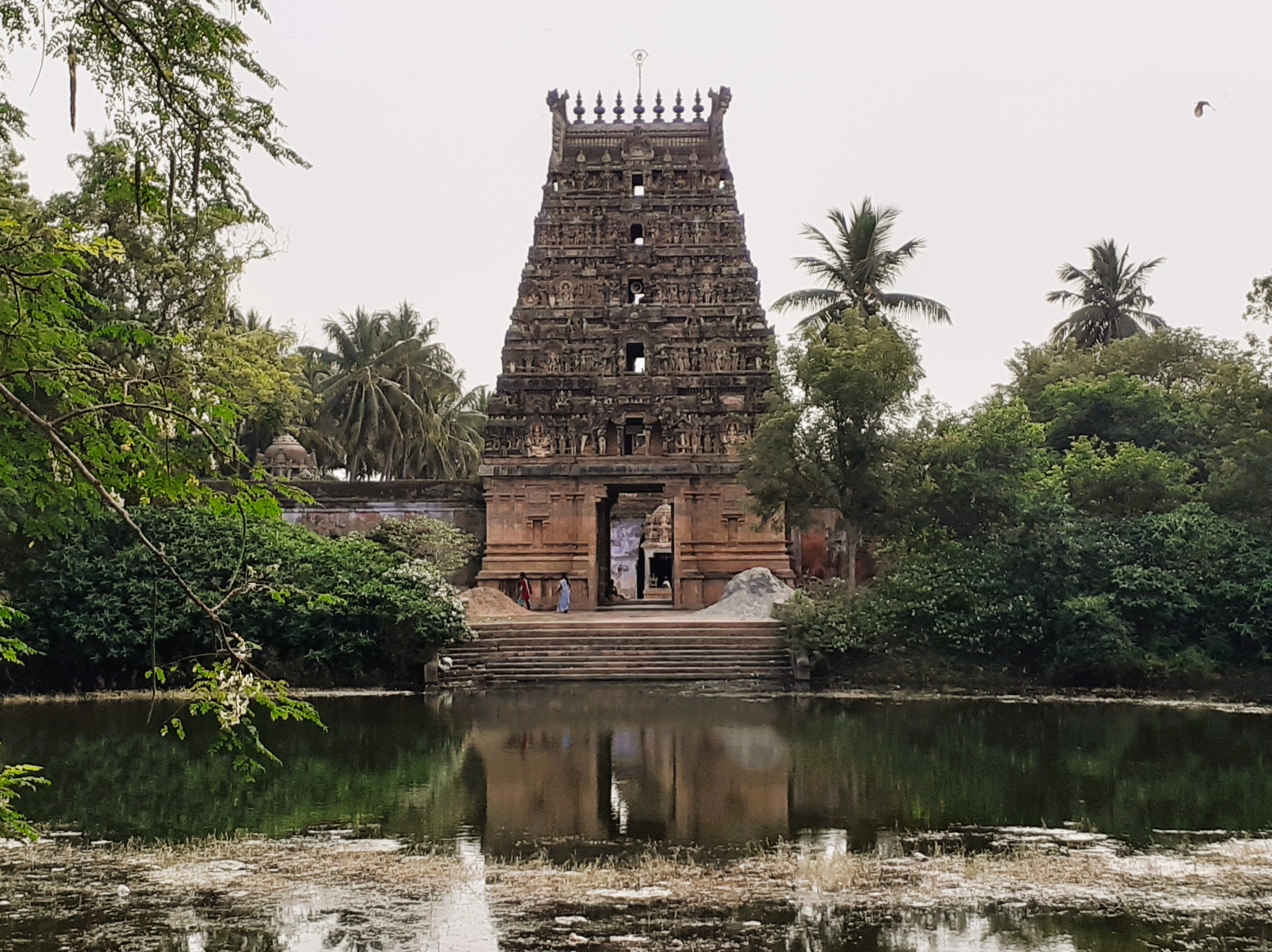

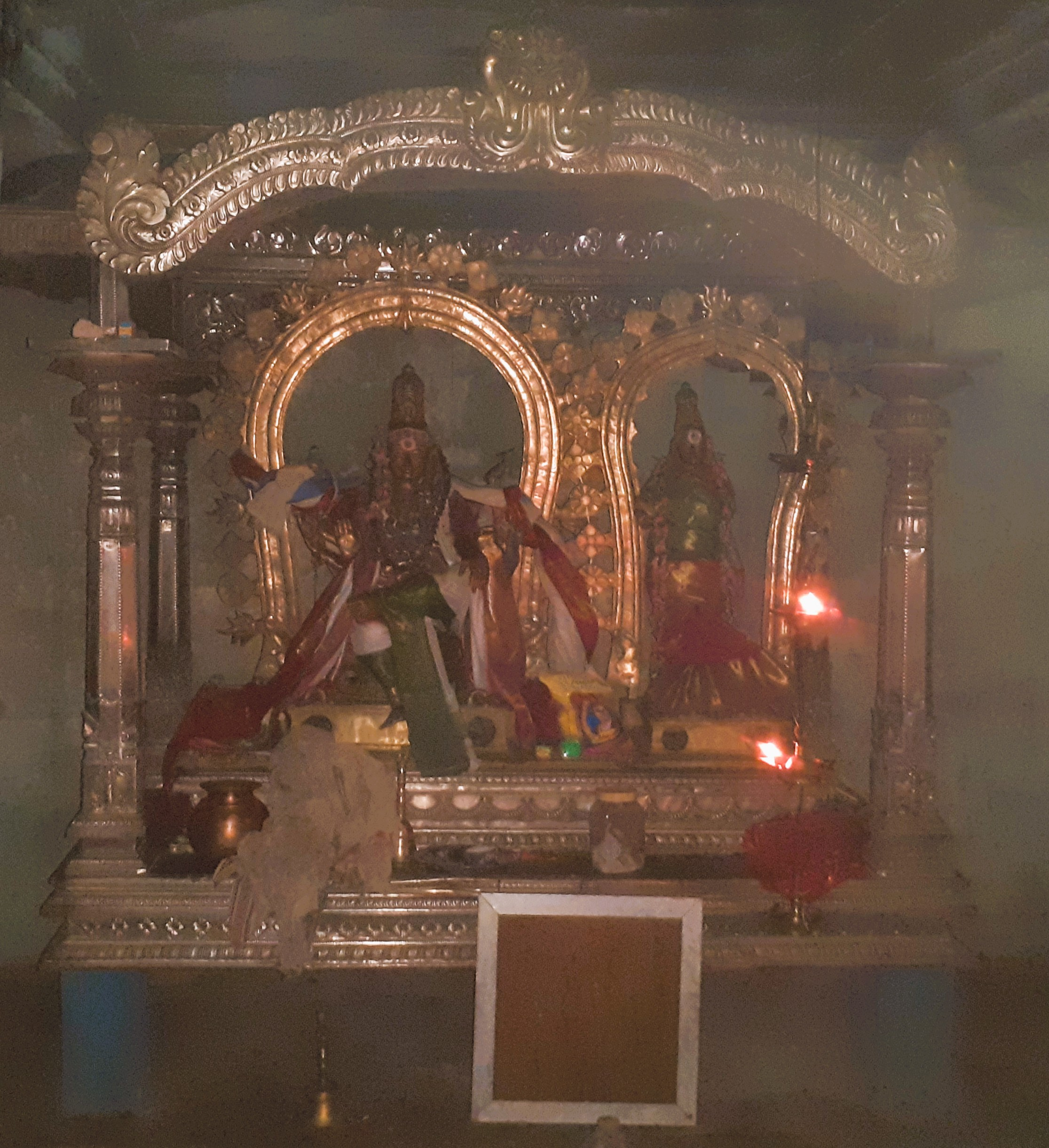

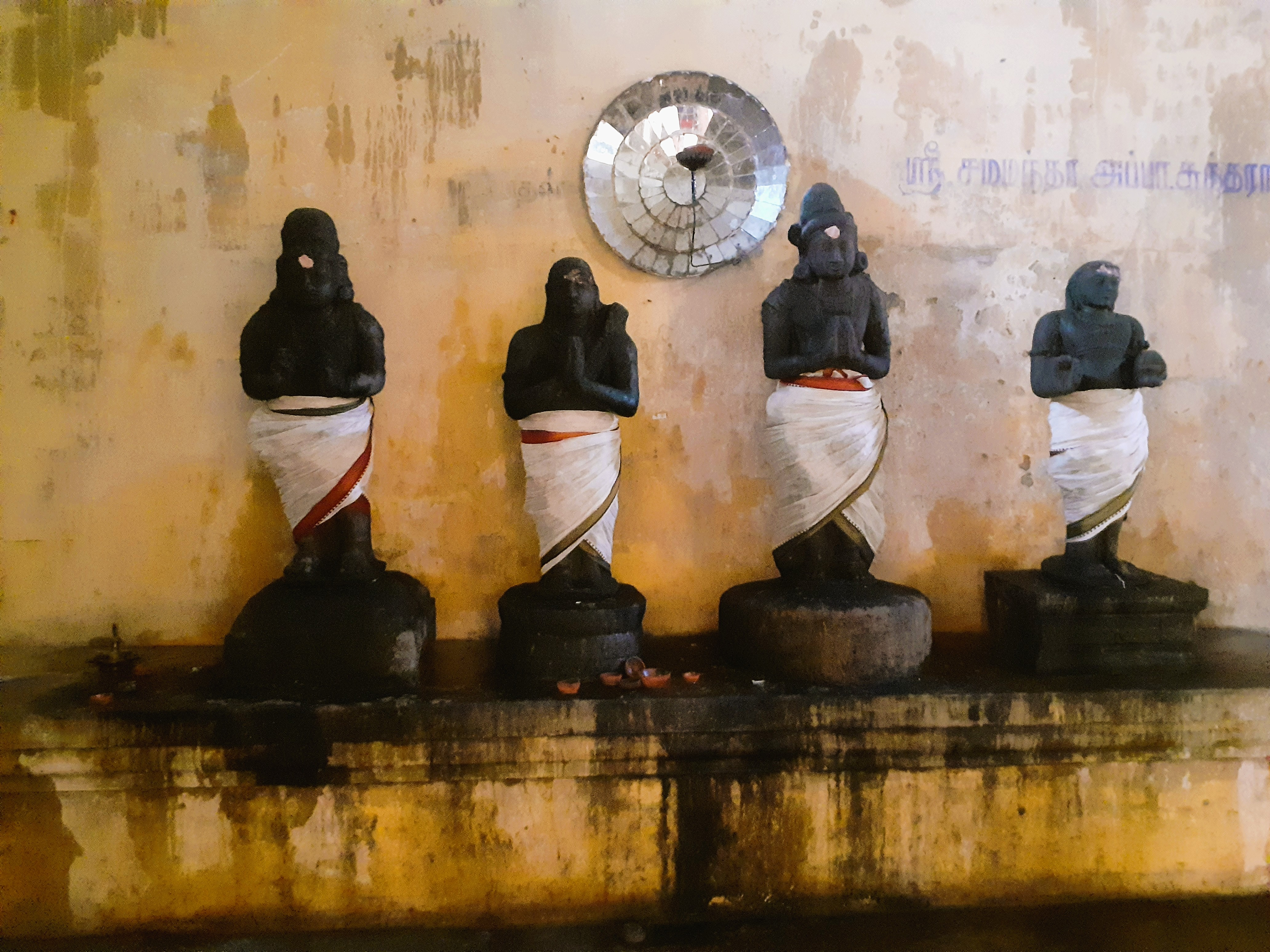

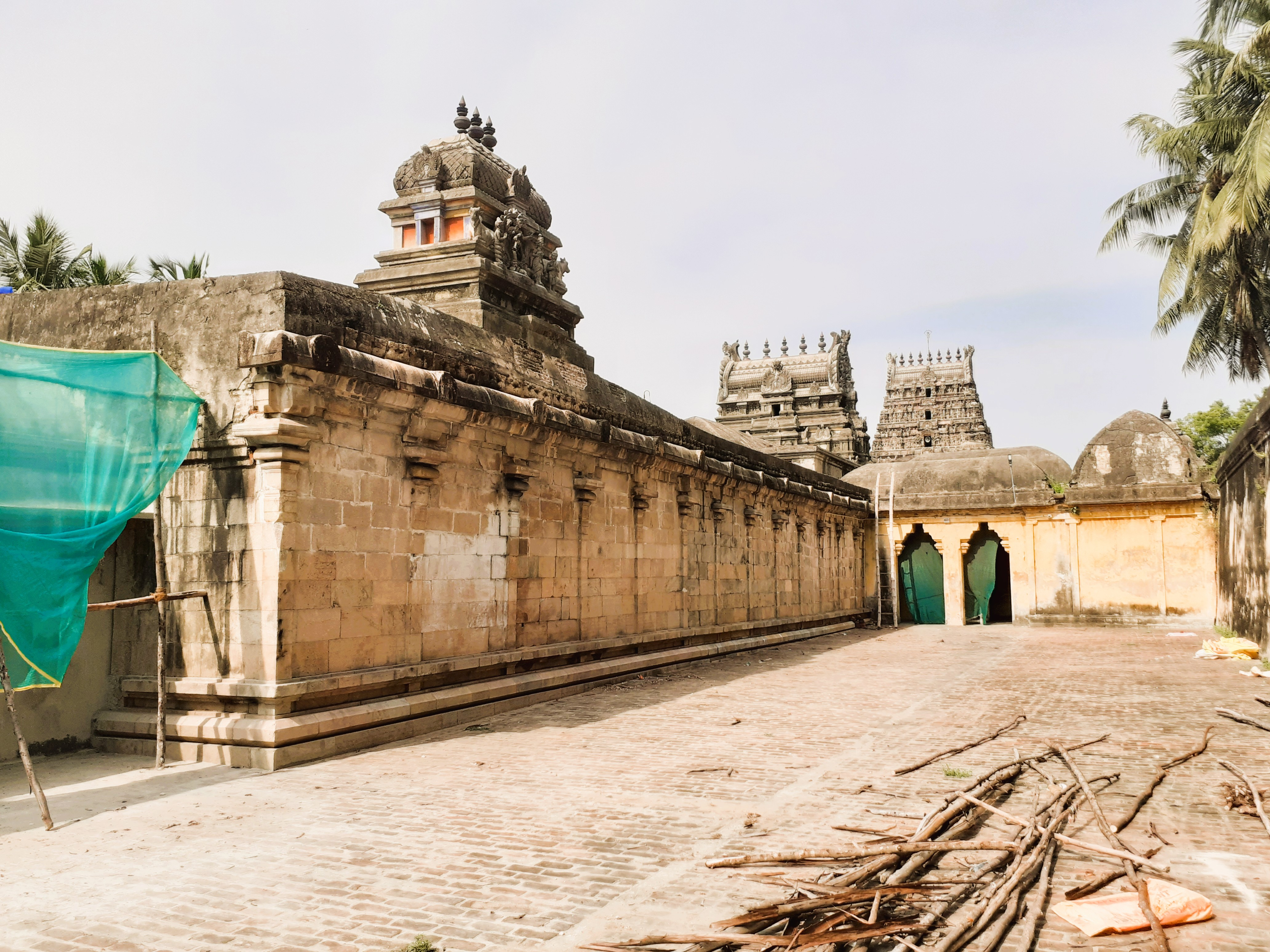

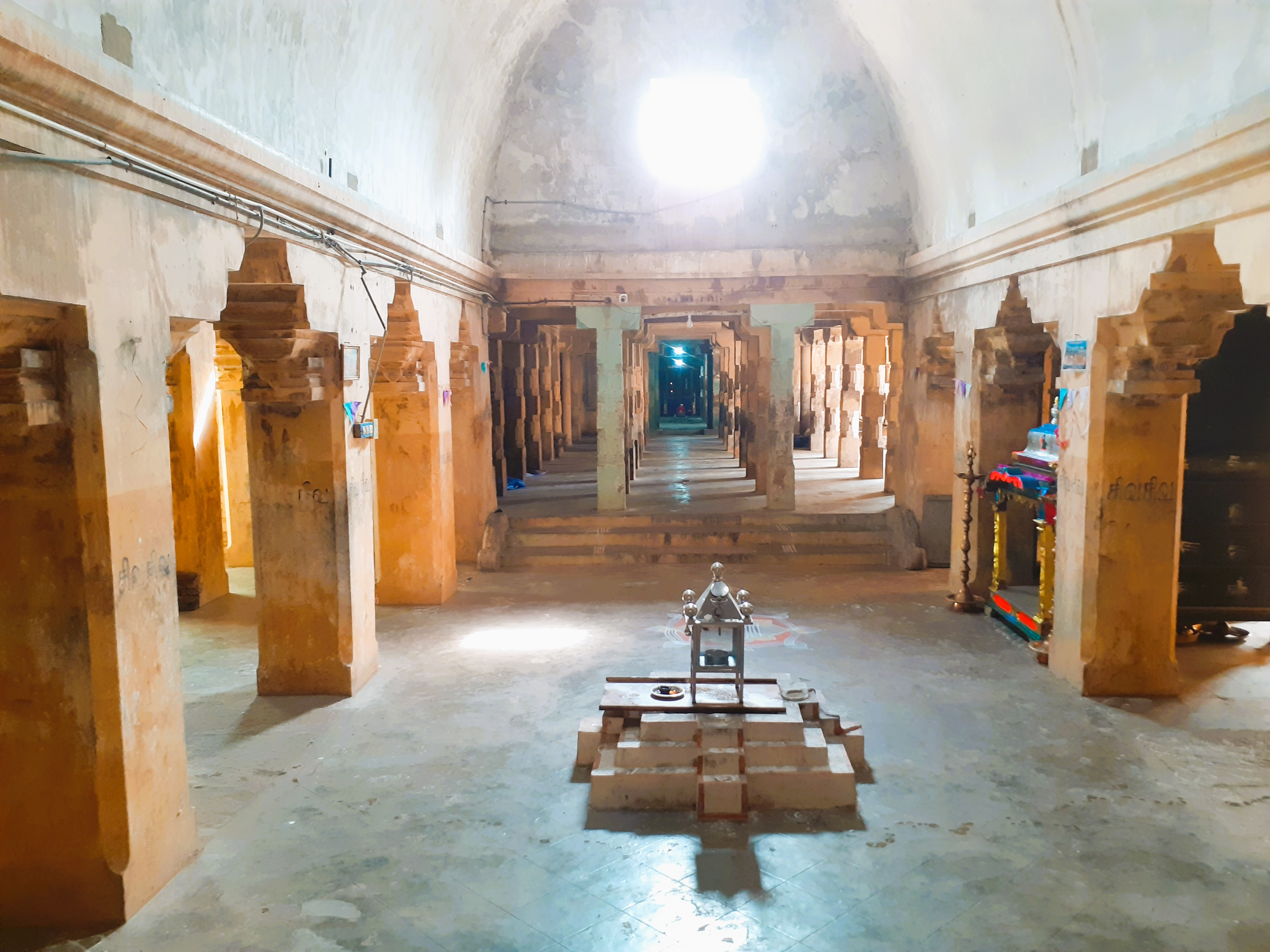
