= Thiruppanandal =

Coordinates: 11°05′46″N 79°28′10″E

- town panchayat
- Interactive map of Thiruppanandal
- Country: India
- State: Tamil Nadu
- District: Thanjavur

Population (2001)
  - Total: 10,376

Languages
  - Official: Tamil
- Time zone: UTC+5:30 (IST)

Thiruppanandal is a panchayat town in Thanjavur district in the Indian state of Tamil Nadu.

== Demographics ==
=== Population ===
As of 2001 India census, Thiruppanandal had a population of 10,376. Males constitute 49% of the population and females 51%. Thiruppanandal has an average literacy rate of 69%, higher than the national average of 59.5%: male literacy is 75%, and female literacy is 63%. In Thiruppanandal, 12% of the population is under 6 years of age.

=== Religion ===
There are approximately 500 Muslim families who reside in the western part of the village. For centuries, they have co-existed peacefully with their Hindu counterparts. The lives of the Muslims revolve around the Muhyuddin Andavar Mosque. There is also a prayer hall in the market area to cater to the needs of the traders there.

== Government and politics ==
=== Civic Utility / Amenities / Services ===
Town has its own water source, food source and other essentials. Power electricity imported from nearby Neyveli - Thermal power plants.

== Economy ==
The major population consists of farmers and agriculture related business men and merchants.

== Culture/Cityscape ==
=== Landmarks ===
Thiruppanandal_Adheenam is another landmark in the town, The Chief Sage is the head of the mutt.

=== Tourist Attractions ===
The prominent monument of the town is the Hindu Temple of lord Shiva, Tiruppanantaal Arunajadeswarar Temple, constructed during Chola dynasty, and currently maintained by State Hindu Religious Board and Kasi Mutt.

== Transport ==
=== By Road ===
The NH-36 passes through the town which connects Chennai with Kumbakonam, Thanjavur and more.

== Education ==
This town has a college (run by Kasi Mutt), called SKSS College of Arts and Science.
