= Tiruvilanagar Uchiravaneswarar Temple =

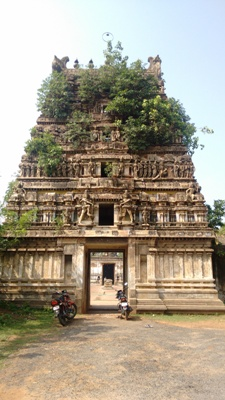
Temple entrance

Tiruvilanagar Uchiravaneswarar Temple is a Hindu temple located at Tiruvila Nagar in Mayiladuthurai district of Tamil Nadu, India. The presiding deity is Shiva. He is called as Uchira Vaneswarar. His consort is known as Veyuru Tholi Ammai.

== Significance ==
It is one of the shrines of the 275 Paadal Petra Sthalams - Shiva Sthalams glorified in the early medieval Tevaram poems by Tamil Saivite Nayanar Tirugnanasambandar.

== Literary mention ==
Tirugnanasambandar describes the feature of the deity as:

பன்னினார்மறை பாடினார் பாயசீர்ப்பழங் காவிரித்

துன்னுதண்டுறை முன்னினார் தூநெறிபெறு வாரெனச்
சென்னிதிங்களைப் பொங்கராக் கங்கையோடுடன் சேர்த்தினார்

மின்னுபொன்புரி நூலினார் மேயதுவிள நகரதே.

== Gallery ==
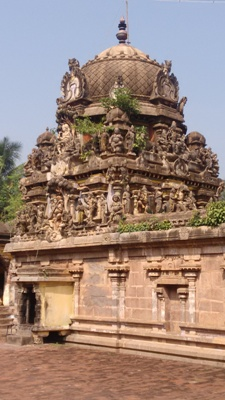
vimana

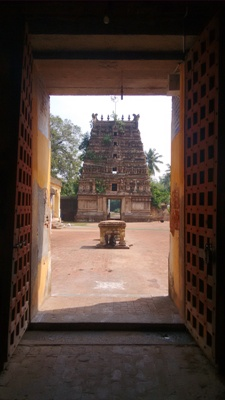
nandhi, balipeetam

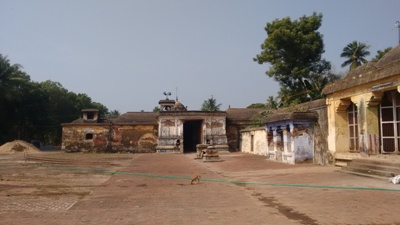
temple premises

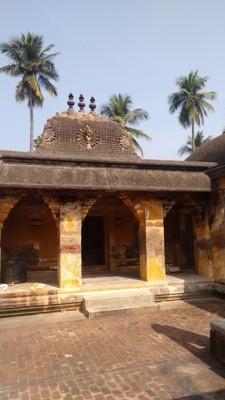
Nataraja shrine
