= Swayambhunathaswamy Temple, Peralam =

Hindu Temple in Tamil Nadu, India

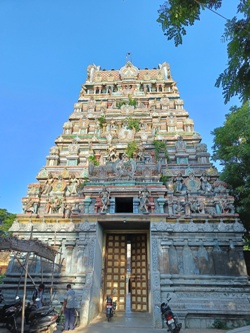
Rajagopura

Swayambhunathaswamy Temple (Tamil: பேரளம் சுயம்புநாதசுவாமி கோயில்) is a Hindu temple located in Peralam in the Mayiladuthurai district of Tamil Nadu, India.

== Location ==
It is located at a distance of 3 km from Kollumangudi, at Peralam in Kumbakonam-Karaikkal road.

== Presiding deity ==
The presiding deity is known as Swayambhunathaswamy and the goddess is Bhavani.

== Specialities ==
The temple tanks are Surya tirtta and Chandra tirtta. Perala munivar, Yagyavalkiyar, Shukracharya, Markandeya and Vishvamitra worshipped Shiva in the temple. In this temple rajagopura, Dhwaja Stambha, nandhi, shrines of the presiding deity and the goddess are found.

== Worshipping time ==
Kumbhabhishekham of the temple was held on 29 January 1959. The temple is opened for worship from 6.00 a.m. to 12.00 p.m. and from 4.00 p.m. to 8.00 p.m.
