= Muruga Nayanar =

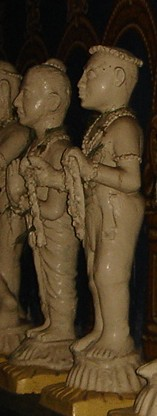
- Muruga Nayanar (right) carrying flower garlands

Personal life
- Born: 6th - 7th century CE Thirupugalur, Chola Kingdom
- Died: 6th - 7th century CE Thirunallur, Chola Kingdom
- Honors: Nayanar saint,

Religious life
- Religion: Hinduism
- Philosophy: Shaivism, Bhakti

Muruga Nayanar or Muruka Nayanar is the 15th Nayanar saint. Traditional hagiographies like Periya Puranam (13th century CE) and Thiruthondar Thogai (10th century CE) describe him as a great devotee of the Hindu god Shiva. He is described to have lived an ascetic life, filled with austerity and selfless devotion to Shiva, spending his time in collecting flowers from woodlands and decorating the Shiva Lingam with garlands and coronets.

== Hagiographical account ==
Muruga Nayanar was born in a Brahmin family in a coastal village called Thirupugalur or Thirupukalur or Pumpukalur in Chola Nadu, now located in Thirumarugal Taluk, Nagapattinam District, Tamil Nadu. His daily routine was to leave home in the early morning and roam around the woodland to collect the colourful and fragrant flowers like lotus, champaka, jasmine, konrai etc. While plucking flowers he used to chant the Panchakshara mantra. He would get back home and tie up the flowers into beautiful garlands and coronets to adorn the Shiva Lingam (Agnishwara) and his consort Parvati. He was in the habit of visiting the temple at least three times daily.

Muruga Nayanar is described as a contemporary of other Nayanars like Sambandar (Tirugnaana Sambandar), Thirunavukkarasar, Sundarar, Thiruneelakandar and Tirunilakanda Yaazpaanar Nayanar. When Sambandar and Thirunavukkarasar, two of the most prominent Nayanars, visited the Thirupugalur temple, Muruga Nayanar warmly welcomed them and took them home. Spending time with them and listening to their hymns, Muruga Nayanar was elated. Sambandar appreciated Muruga Nayanar's devotion to Shiva and developed thick friendship with him.

Sambandar invited Muruga Nayanar to his wedding in Nallur Perumanam. After the wedding, Sambandar, his bride and other Shiva devotees went again to Nallur Perumanam temple of Shiva. Sambandar prayed to Shiva, seeking salvation and sang a hymn called Panchakshara Pathikam. Shiva appeared before him and granted his wish. Then Sambandar, his bride and all the wedding guests, including Muruga Nayanar merged in the Light of Siva.

The Tamil month Vaikasi, star Moolam (nakshatra) is observed as Muruga Nayanar's Guru pooja day in all Shiva temples.
