= Achalpuram Shivalokathyagar Temple =

Hindu temple in Tamil Nadu, India

Coordinates: 11.329000°N 79.755689°E

Achalpuram Shivalokathyagar Temple (ஆச்சாள்புரம் சிவலோகத்தியாகர் கோயில்) is a Hindu temple located in Achalpuram village, in the Kollidam block of Mayiladuthurai district of Tamil Nadu, India. The presiding deity is Shiva. He is called as Shivalokathyagar. His consort is known as Tiruvennetru Umaiammai.

== Significance ==
Achalpuram Shivalokathyagar Temple is one of the shrines of the 275 Paadal Petra Sthalams - Shiva Sthalams glorified in the early medieval Tevaram poems by Tamil Saivite Nayanar Tirugnanasambandar. The temple is believed to have been the place where saint Sambanthar's spirit merged with the deity. It is believed that Sambandar attained Mukti (salvation) at this place. Many other saints like Thiruneelakanta Yazhpanar and his wife Madhanga Soodamani, Tiruneelanakka Nayanar and Muruga Nayanar also attained salvation here. The temple is counted as one of the temples built on the banks of River Kaveri.

== Literary Mention ==
Tirugnanasambandar describes the feature of the deity as:

அன்புறு சிந்தைய ராகி யடியவர்

நன்புறு நல்லூர்ப் பெருமண மேவிநின்
றின்புறு மெந்தை யிணையடி யேத்துவார்

துன்புறு வாரல்லர் தொண்டுசெய் வாரே.
