= Tirunilanakka Nayanar =

Hindu saint

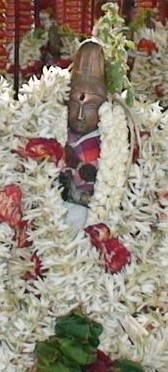

Personal life
- Born: 6th - 7th century CE Thirusattamangai, Chola Kingdom
- Died: 6th - 7th century CE Thirunallur, Chola Kingdom
- Honors: Nayanar saint,

Religious life
- Religion: Hinduism
- Philosophy: Shaivism, Bhakti

Tirunilanakka Nayanar (also spelt as Tiruneelanakka Nayanar and Thiru Neela Nakka Nayanar), also known Tiruneelanakka, Nilanakkar and Nilanakkan, was a Nayanar saint, venerated in the Hindu sect of Shaivism. He is generally counted as the twenty-eighth in the list of 63 Nayanars. He is described as a contemporary of Sambandar (first half of the 7th century CE), one of the most prominent Nayanars.

== Life ==
The life of Tiruneelanakka Nayanar is described in the Tamil Periya Puranam by Sekkizhar (12th century), which is a hagiography of the 63 Nayanars.

Tiruneelanakka Nayanar was born in Sattamangai (Thirusathamangai/Satthamangkai), an important town in the Chola kingdom. The town is currently called Seeyathamangai, Nagapattinam district in the Indian state of Tamil Nadu. The Ayavantheeswarar temple dedicated to the god Shiva, patron of Shaivism, stands in this town. Tiruneelanakka was born in a family of Brahmins (priest caste), whose duty was to recite the Vedic scriptures. An expert in the Vedas, he was a staunch devotee of Shiva and served his devotees, by washing their feet and welcoming them to his home. He used to worship in the temple as the Agamic texts.

Once on the day of Poornima (the full moon day), Tiruneelanakka and his wife went to the Shiva shrine. While Tiruneelanakka was performing his daily ritual worship of the lingam (the aniconic form of Shiva worshipped as the central icon in temples), a spider fell from his web on the lingam. The wife blew away the spider, wherein some saliva could have fallen on the lingam. In some versions, she goes a step further and spits on the spot where the spider falls. This action was in accordance with the tradition of spitting on a part of a child where the spider fell so as the poison of the spider does not spread in the body. Tiruneelanakka considered her action blasphemous and asked the wife what she had done. She replied she just blew away the spider as per tradition. The infuriated Brahmin said that she had contaminated the lingam by her saliva, as per Agamic scriptures and she should have removed the spider by some other means. The Brahmin offered rituals to purify the lingam and apologized to the god. Further, he abandoned his wife in fury.

While the wife spent her night in the temple, Tiruneelanakka went home and slept. Shiva appeared in Tiruneelanakka's dream. While a part of the body was normal, rest of it was swollen by the spider's poison. Shiva remarked that his normal area was where Tiruneelanakka's wife had blown/spat. Tiruneelanakka realized that devotion (love) was superior to rituals. In the dawn, he went dancing to the temple and worshipped Ayavantheeswarar. He returned with his wife. Tiruneelanakka continued to serve Shiva and his devotees with love.

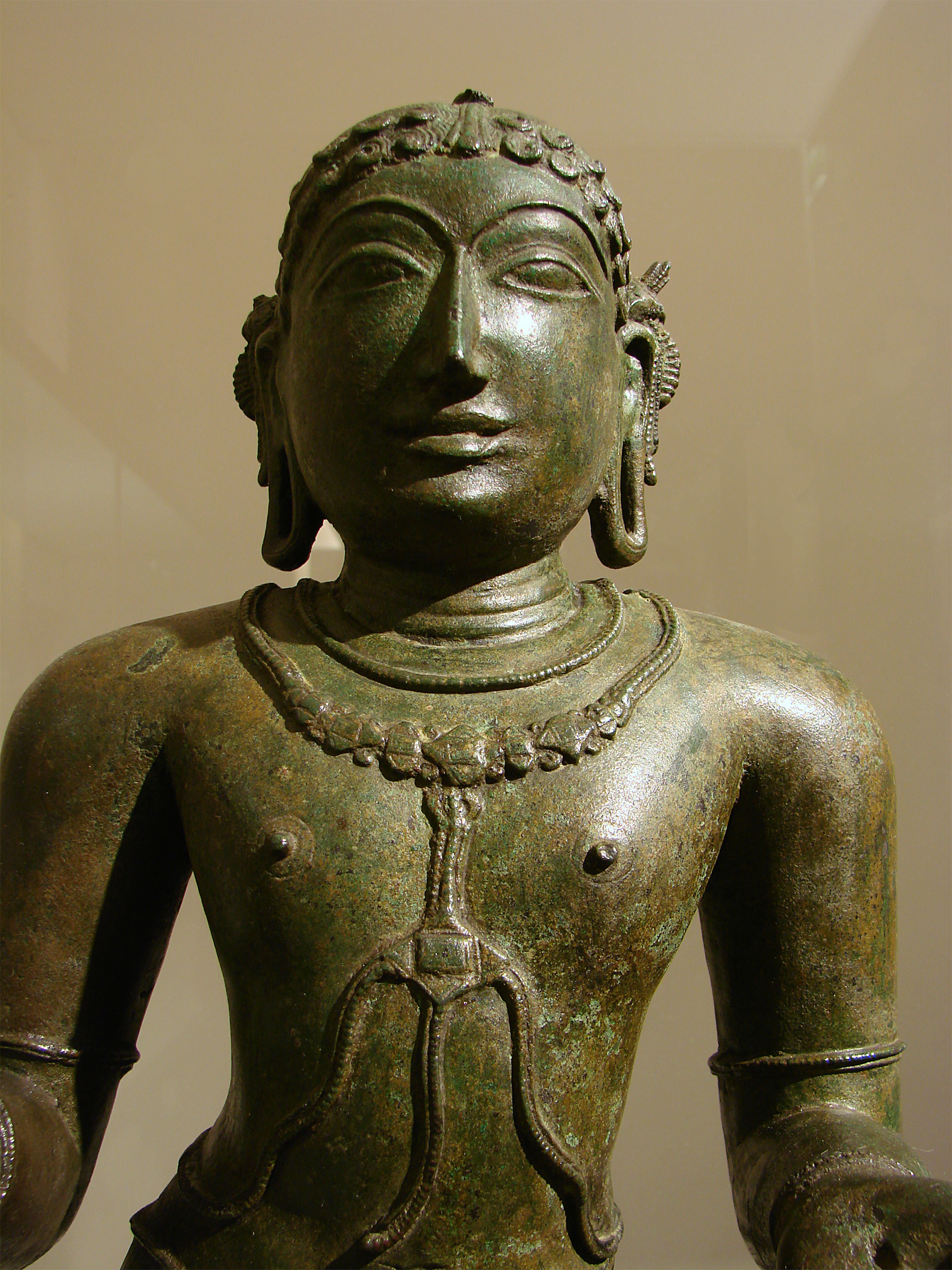
Sambandar (pictured) visited the house of Tiruneelanakka Nayanar.

Having heard of the child saint Sambandar's glories, Tiruneelanakka visited to meet him in person. Tiruneelanakka heard that the Nayanar Sambandar accompanied by another Nayanar Tiru Nilakanta Yazhpanar and an entourage of devotees were coming to Sattamangai. Tiruneelanakka decorated Sattamangai for welcoming Sambandar and hosted him at his home. He honoured Sambandar with due respect. Tiruneelanakka made numerous arrangements for Sambandar to spend the night at his house.

Sambandar also suggested that Yazhpanar and his wife - who were travelling minstrels and composed music to Sambandar's hymns - be given accommodation. The caste-conscious host was uneasy inviting the Shudra (low-caste) couple of Tiru Nilakanta Yazhpanar and his wife home. After insistence by Sambanar, the host gave them a place to sleep near the homa kunda, the fire altar used for sacrifices. The fire of homa kunda shone brightly in the night, giving testimony to the couple's devotion. Tiruneelanakka discerned that devotion is superior to caste barriers too.

Sambandar accompanied Tiruneelanakka to the Ayavantheeswarar temple and composed a hymn in honour of the god and his host Tiruneelanakka Nayanar. Tiruneelanakka wanted to accompany Sambandar on his travels, but the child saint instructed Tiruneelanakka to stay in Sattamangai and serve Ayavantheeswarar and his devotees. Sambandar left and Tiruneelanakka complied.

After a while, Sambandar invited Tiruneelanakka Nayanar to his wedding in Thirumana Nallur (presently known as Achalpuram). Tiruneelanakka officiated as the presiding priest of the wedding ceremony. After the wedding, Sambandar, his bride and the wedding party went to the Shivaloka Thyagar temple of Shiva, in Thirumana Nallur. Sambandar prayed to Shiva, seeking salvation. Shiva appeared as a blazing flame and granted his wish. Then Sambandar, his bride and all the wedding guests, including Tiruneelanakka Nayanar merged in the Light of Shiva.

== Remembrance ==
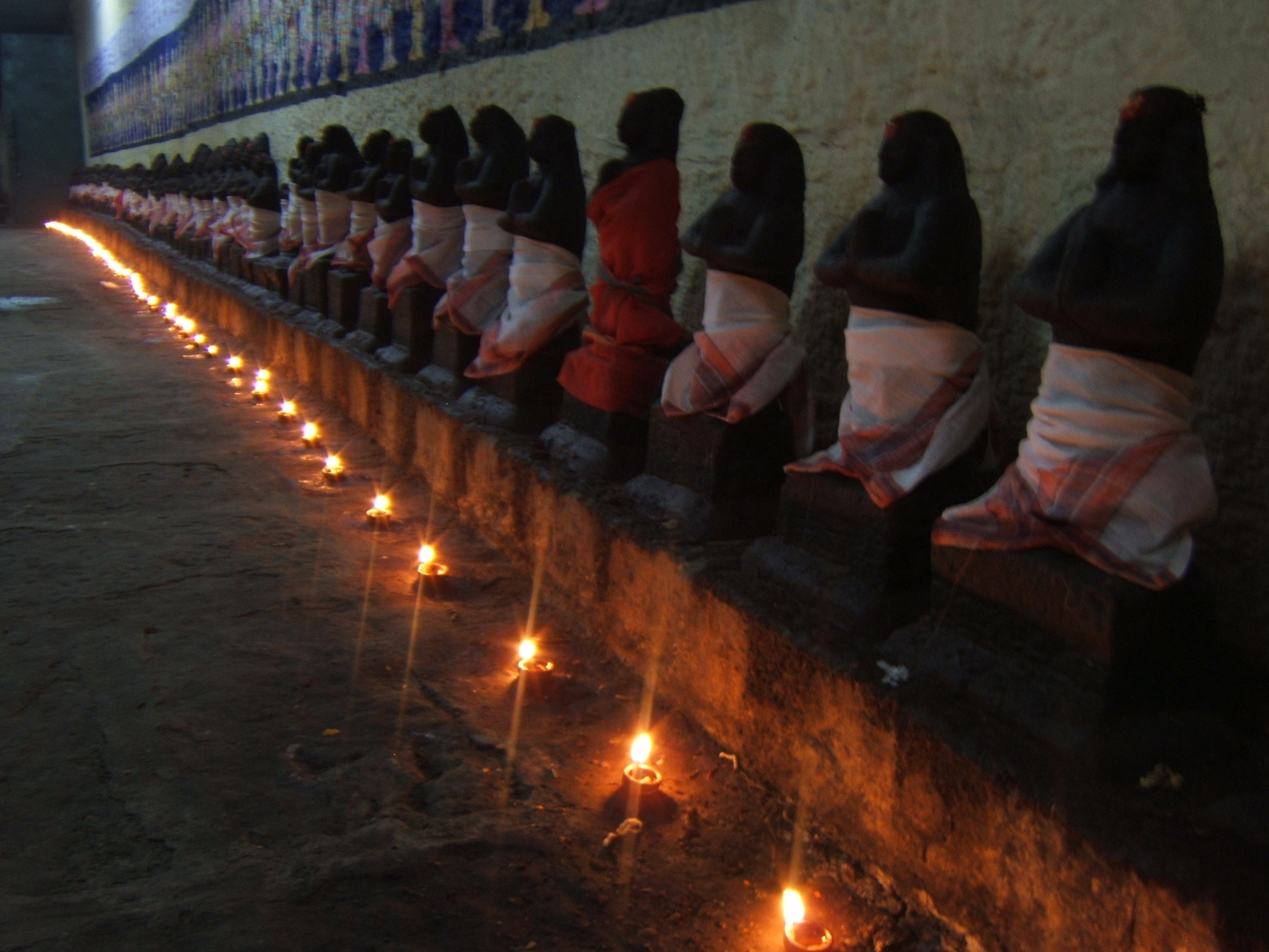
The images of the Nayanars are found in many Shiva temples in Tamil Nadu.

One of the most prominent Nayanars, Sundarar (8th century) venerates Tiruneelanakka Nayanar in the Tiruthonda Thogai, a hymn to Nayanar saints, calling him Nilanakkan of Sattamangai. As mentioned in the earlier section, a hymn by Sambanar also honours him.

An image of Tiruneelanakka Nayanar is worshipped in Ayavantheeswarar temple, the Shiva temple in his native village.

Tiruneelanakka Nayanar is worshipped in the Tamil month of Vaikasi, when the moon enters the Mula nakshatra (lunar mansion). He is depicted with a crown and folded hands (see Anjali mudra). He receives collective worship as part of the 63 Nayanars. Their icons and brief accounts of his deeds are found in many Shiva temples in Tamil Nadu. Their images are taken out in procession in festivals.
