= Tiruppanantaal Arunajadeswarar Temple =

Tiruppanantaal Arunajadewswarar Temple (திருப்பனந்தாள் அருணஜடேசுவரர் கோயில்) is a Hindu temple located at Tirupanandal in Thanjavur district of Tamil Nadu, India. The historical name of the place is Thadagaieswaram. The presiding deity is Shiva. He is called as Aruna Jadewswarar. His consort is known as Periya Nayaki.

== Significance ==
It is one of the shrines of the 275 Paadal Petra Sthalams - Shiva Sthalams glorified in the early medieval Tevaram poems by Tamil Saivite Nayanar Tirugnanasambandar. Hymns in praise of the temple have been sung by Sambandar, Thirunavukkarasar, Nambiyandar Nambi and Arunagirinathar.

== Architecture ==
Aruna Jadeswarar Temple is situated in the town of Thiruppanandal, headquarters of the Thiruppanandal block of the Thiruvidaimarudur taluk. The Thiruppanandal Adheenam is based here. The temple lies on the banks of the Kollidam River. The presiding deity is Shiva in the form of Aruna Jadeswarar. His consort is Periya Nayaki. There are shrines to Ambika, Durga and Naga Kanni. The Rajagopura of the temple faces west. The temple has a total of three prakaras. The temple complex encloses the Kasi mutt founded by Saivite saint Kumaragurupara Desikar.

== Literary Mention ==
Tirugnanasambandar describes the feature of the deity as:

சூழ்தரு வல்வினையு முடல் தோன்றிய பல்பிணியும்

பாழ்பட வேண்டுதிரேல் மிக வேத்துமின் பாய்புனலும்
போழிள வெண்மதியும் மனல் பொங்கரவும் புனைந்த

தாழ்சடை யான் பனந்தாட் டிருத் தாடகை யீச்சரமே.
