= Thiruppanandal Adheenam =

The Thiruppanandal Adheenam is a Saivite monastic institution based in the town of Thiruppanandal in Tamil Nadu, India. As of 2003, the Thiruppanandal Adheenam was one of the biggest landowning agencies in Thanjavur district. It is one of largest land managing agency.

== Activities ==
The Adheenam is involved in publishing Saivite literature, specifically Thevaram and Tiruvasakam and its translations. It is also involved in literary scholarship. The Adheenam along with Thiruvaduthurai Adheenam and Dharmapuram Adheenam were founded during the 16th century to spread the ideology of Saiva Sidhantam.
