= Mullaivananathar Temple =

Shiva temple in Tamil Nadu, India

Mullaivananathar Temple (முல்லைவனநாதர் கோயில்) is a Hindu temple located at Thirumullaivasal in Mayiladuthurai district of Tamil Nadu, India which is dedicated to Shiva.

== History ==
The temple was constructed by the Early Chola king Killivalavan. The presiding deity is called as Mullaivana Nathar. His consort is known as Ani Konda Kothai Ammai. It is believed that goddess had her initiation in this place.

== Significance ==
It is one of the shrines of the 275 Paadal Petra Sthalams - Shiva Sthalams glorified in the early medieval Tevaram poems by Tamil Saivite Nayanar Tirugnanasambandar. The temple is counted as one of the temples built on the northern banks of River Kaveri.

== Literary Mention ==
Tirugnanasambandar describes the feature of the deity as:

கொம்பன்ன மின்னி னிடையாளொர் கூறன் விடைநாளு மேறு குழகன்

நம்பன்னெ மன்பன் மறைநாவன் வானின் மதியேறு சென்னி யரனூர்
அம்பன்ன வொண்க ணவரா டரங்கின் அணிகோ புரங்க ளழகார்

செம்பொன்ன செவ்வி தருமாட நீடு திருமுல்லை வாயி லிதுவே.
