= Moolavar =

Central deity in a Hindu temple

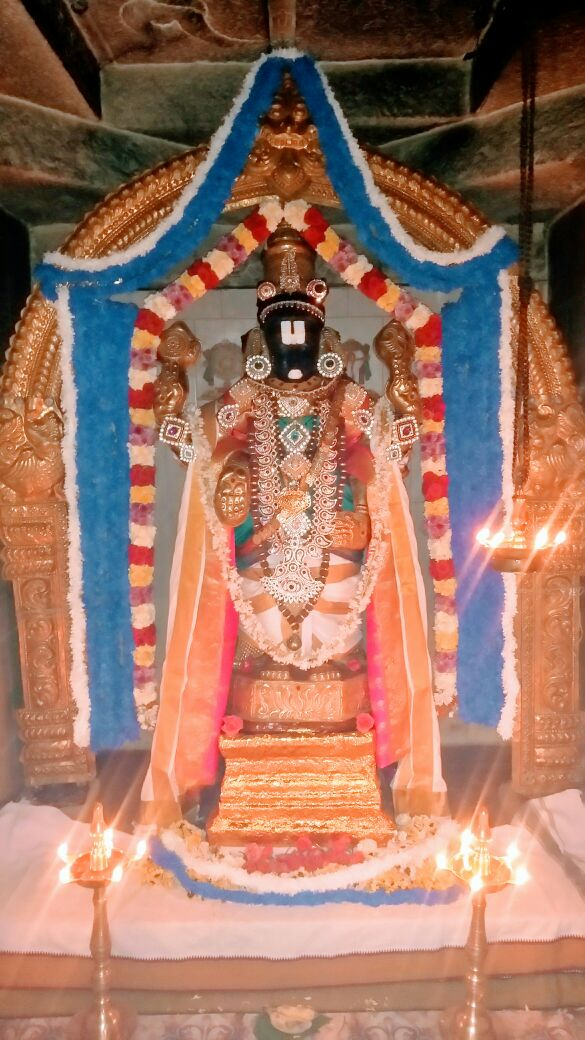
Mulavar of Pandurangaswamy Temple

Mulavar (Tamil: மூலவர், romanized: mūlavar) or Mula-murti is a Sanskrit-Tamil term referring to the main deity, or a murti (cult image) in a Hindu temple.

== Location ==
The central deity, mulavar, is located near the centre of temples, than the images that surround them, and are precisely located at the points corresponding to the energies they represent on the temple plan's power diagram. During the Kumbabhishekam or the coronation event, the temple is renovated, while the mulavar image is moved to a temporary location. The practice is called Balalayam, during which a temporary image is housed in the sanctum.

=== Sanctum ===
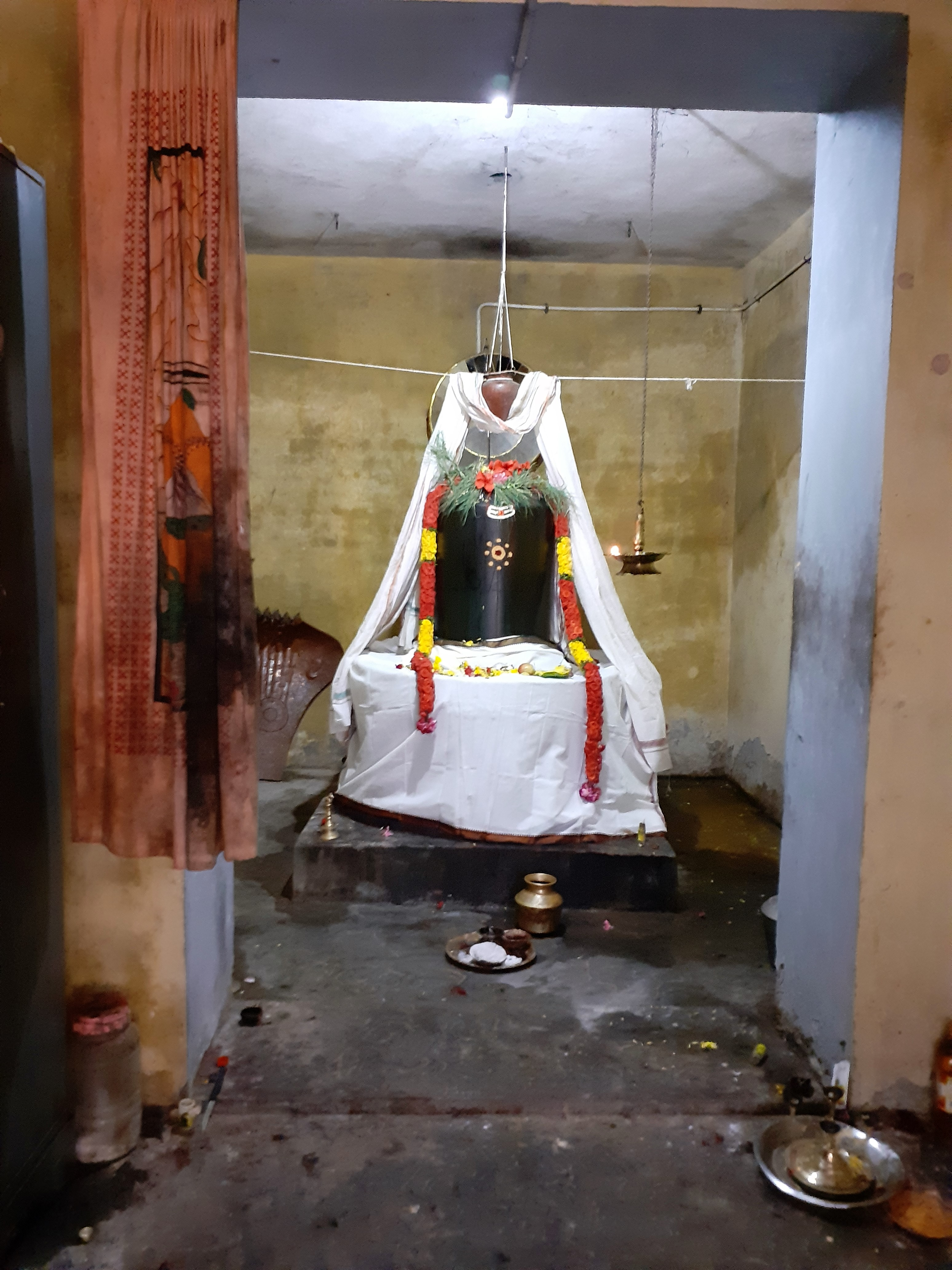
Mulavar of Shiva

Garbhagriha (lit. womb chamber) is a Sanskrit word referring to the interior of the sanctum sanctorum, the innermost sanctum of a Hindu temple, where resides the murti (idol or icon) of the primary deity of the temple. The sanctum is located at the centre of the temple, and its only opening mostly faces east. Only the pujari (priests) are allowed to enter the sanctum. The mulavar is usually made of stone images in most South Indian temples. In some temples, it is made of limestone or wood. In Shiva temples, the mulavar vigraha is usually a lingam (an iconic form), while in all other temples, the sculpted image of the respective deities are sported with their weapons in different positions based on the legend associated with the temple. In large temples, more than one image is housed inside the sanctum. Some of the temples like the ones in the 108 Divya Desams, the 12 Jyotirlingas, the Panchabhoota temples, the 51 Shakta pithas are all believed to be self-manifested and made out of mostly black stone.
