= Ilango Mutharaiyar =

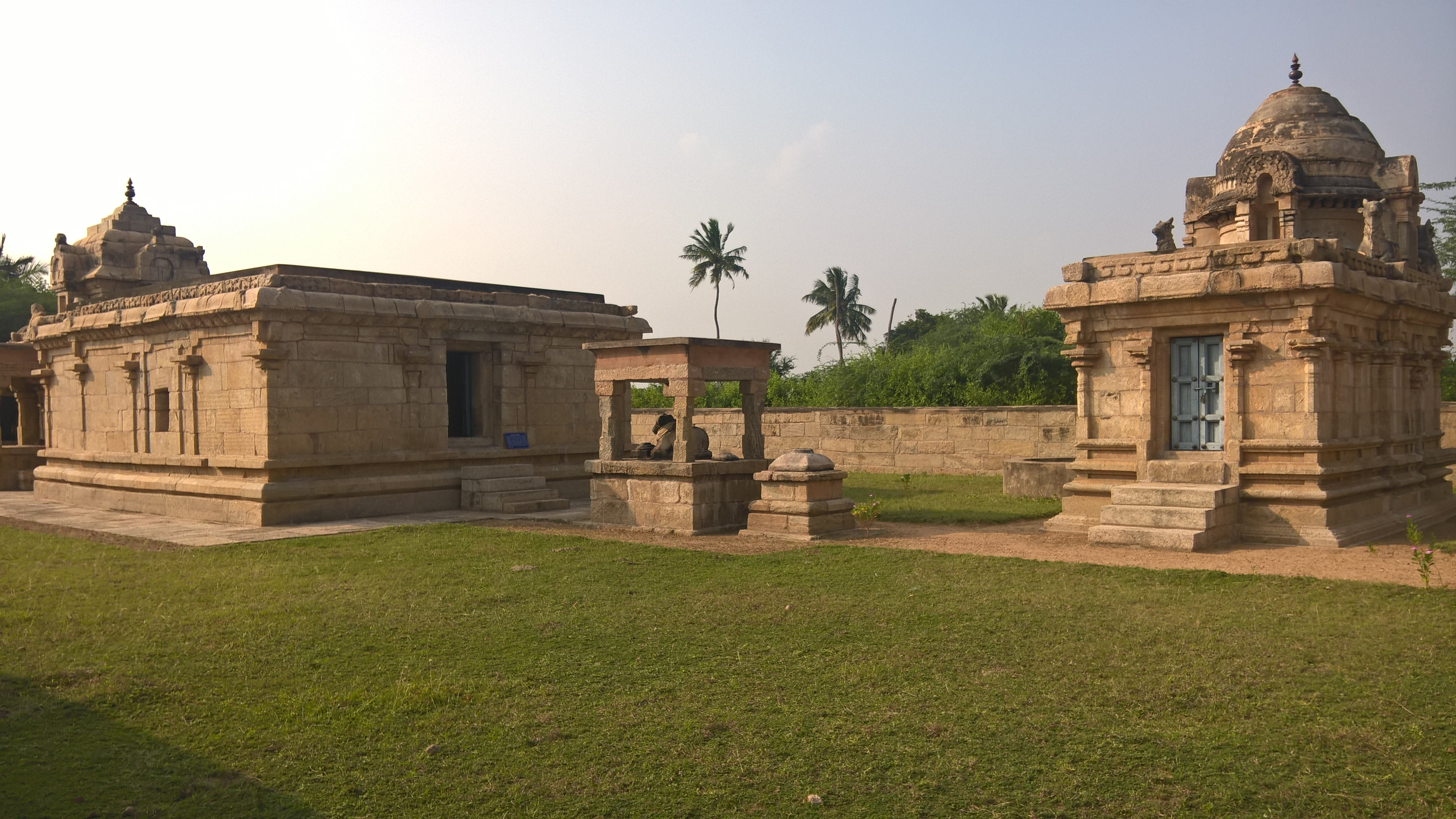
Uthamadhaneeswarar temple believed to have been built by Ilango Mutharaiyar - Keezhathaniyam

Ilango Mutharaiyar or Ko Ilango Mutharaiyar, also known as Videl Vidugu Ilangovathi Mutharaiyan, was the last ruler of the Mutharaiyar dynasty (610 AD-851 AD).

== Temples ==
Vijayalaya choleeswaram

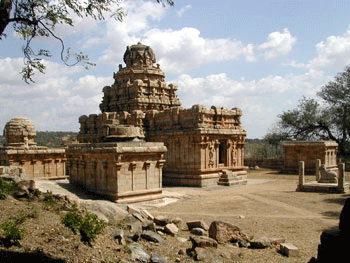
Vijayala choleeswaram built by Ilango Mutharaiyar 825 AD

Narthamalai is 35 kilometres (22 mi) from Trichy on the Pudukkottai - Trichy Highway. There can be seen one of the oldest rock-cut temples built by Ilango Mutharaiyar, which was later rebuilt by Vijayalaya Chola, known as Vijayalaya Choleeswaram. The temple is dedicated to Shiva. There are also two rock-cut caves, one of which has 12 life-size sculptures of Vishnu. The temple is maintained and administered by the Archaeological Survey of India as a protected monument.

Original history therinthal sollavum... Thalmai udan ketu kolgiren. As a historian ah solren after seeing this website mana aluthin karathinal valkaiye veruthuviten.

== Keezhathaniyam temple ==
Mutharaiyar was responsible for the construction of a temple at Keezhathaniyam, about 29 kilometres (18 mi) from Pudukkottai. Known as Uthamadhaneeswarar, it is dedicated to Shiva.

== See also ==
- Muthuraja
- Perumbidugu Mutharaiyar
- Kannappa Nayanar
- Thirumangai Alvar
