= Muttaraiyar =

Muttaraiyar may refer to:

- Muttaraiyan (title), a title used by various officials in the Chola government during the medieval period
- Muthuraja, a Tamil speaking community prevalent in southern India
- Mutharaiyar dynasty, a royal family in what is now the Indian state of Tamil Nadu
