= Tiruttalinathar Temple =

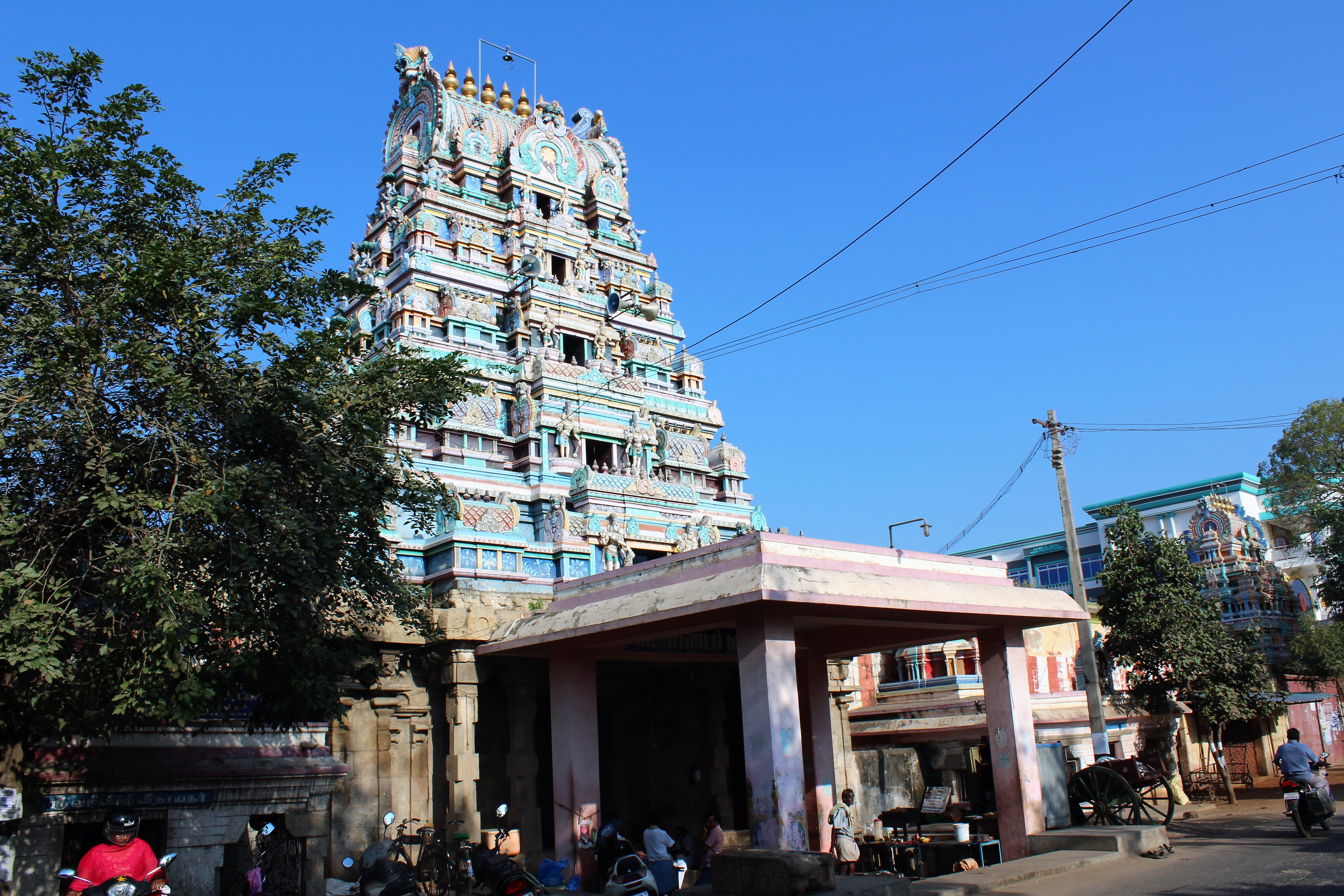

- Location in Tamil Nadu

Religion
- Affiliation: Hinduism
- District: Sivaganga
- Deity: Tiruttalinathar (Shiva)

Location
- Location: Tirupathur, Tamil Nadu, India
- State: Tamil Nadu
- Country: India
- Coordinates: 10°08′N 78°37′E

Architecture
- Type: Dravidian architecture

Tiruttalinathar temple is a Siva temple located in Thiruputhur near Karaikkudi. This temple is regarded as the 6th of the Tevara Stalams in the Pandya kingdom of Tamil Nadu. The temples Rameswaram and Tiruvadanai are the other Shivastalams nearby. It is one of the shrines of the 275 Paadal Petra Sthalams.

== Mythology ==
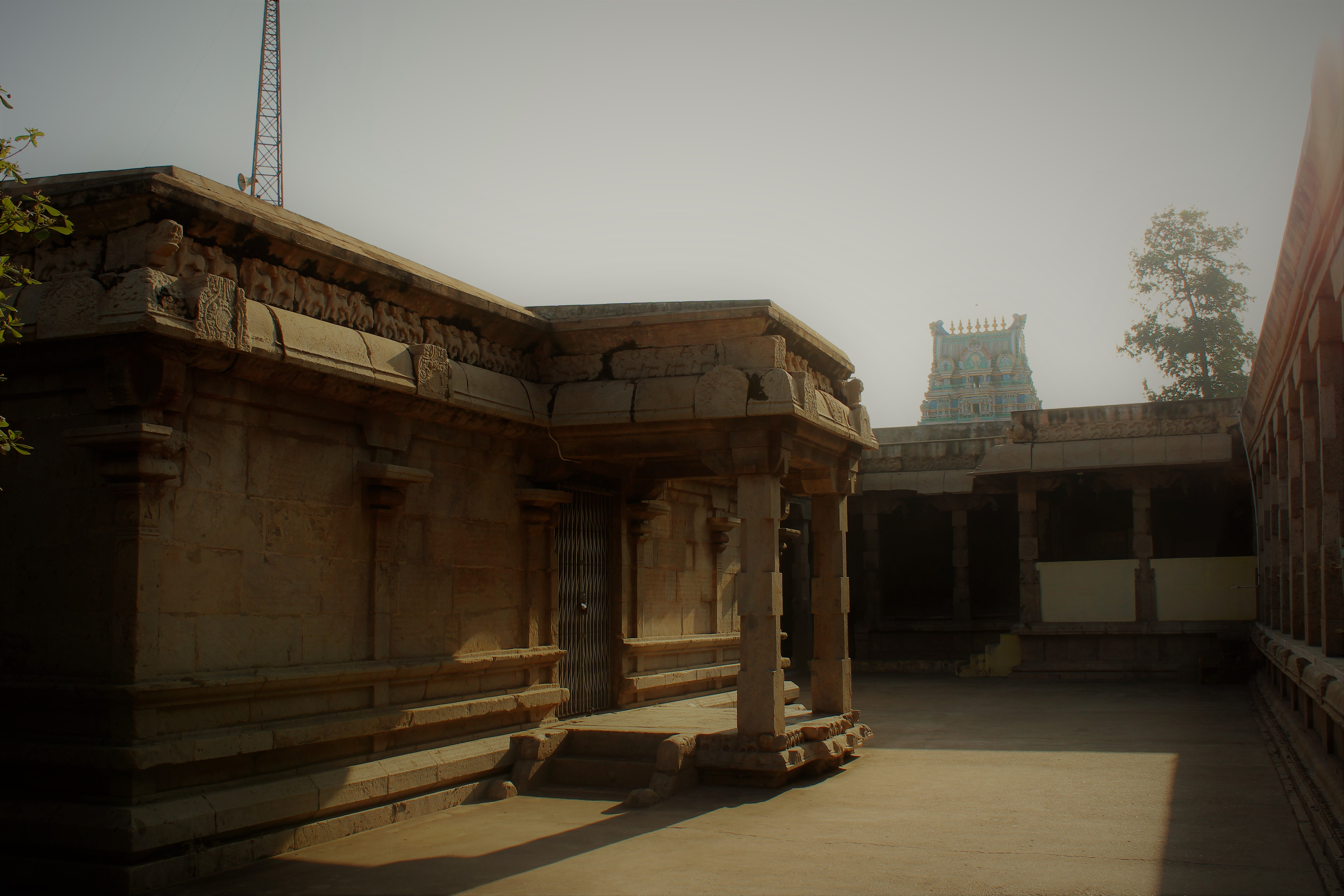
Shrines in the campus

The snakes Vasuki and Kaarkotakan worshipped Lord Shiva there, hence the separate shrine for Tirunageswarar in the outer 3rd prakaram (outer courtyard).

Pranavam is said to have realized that Shiva and Pranavam were the same there and is said to have manifested as the Konrai Maram.

Goddess Mahalaskhmi once wished to have a darshan of Lord Shiva's dance. Lord Shiva acceded to her request and told her that she can have a vision of his dance at this sthalam. Accordingly, Shiva revealed a vision of his Cosmic Dance known as Gowri Thandavam to Goddess Mahalakshmi there.

Agasthyar, Valmiki, Jayanthan the son Devendran are said to have worshipped there.

This temple had royal patronage from the early Chola, Pandiya and Chera kings, and by the later period Pallavas, Sethupathy Raja and Maruthu Pandiyar.

== Architectural design ==
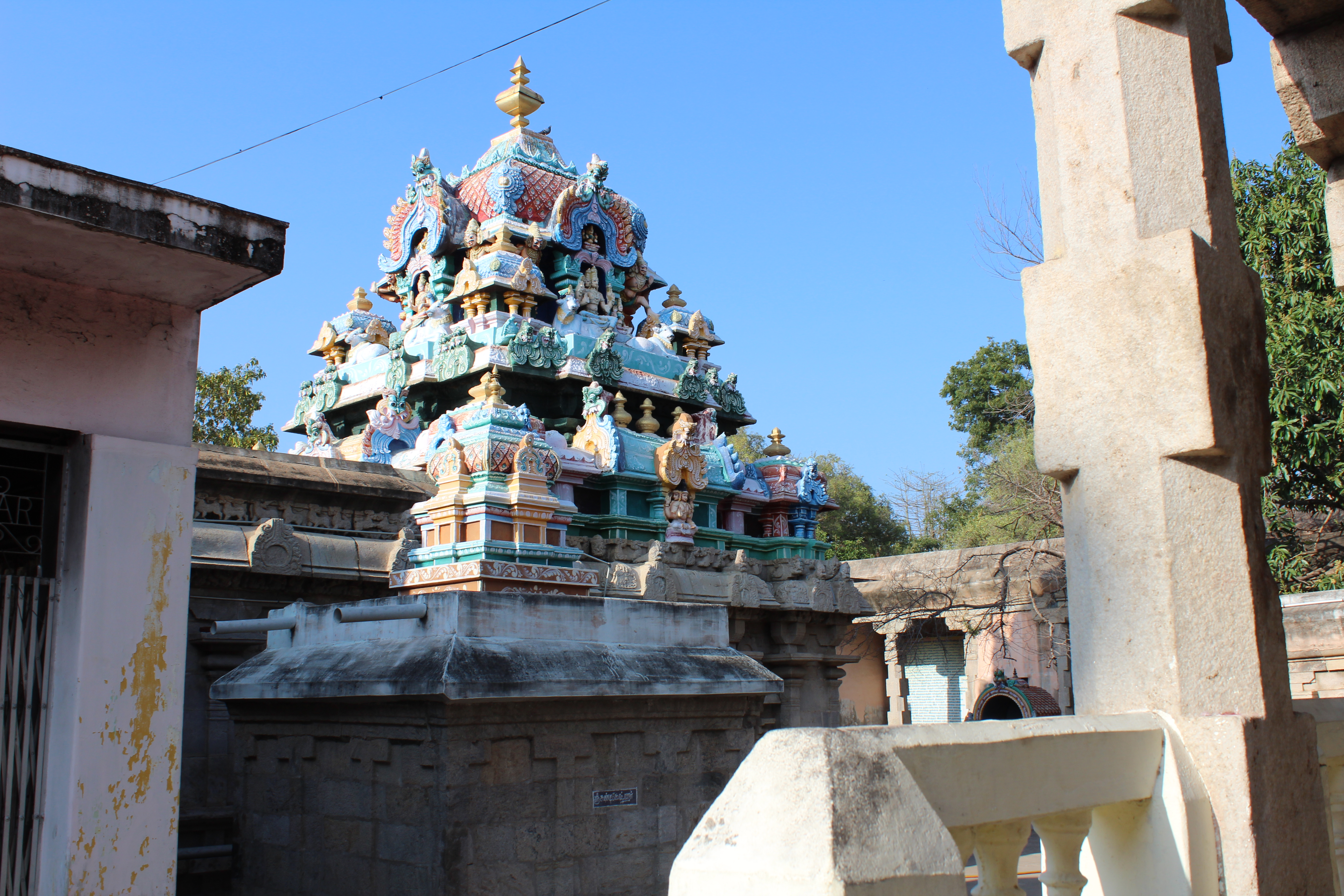
Shrines in the campus

Although Thiruputhur is small, the temple is massive. This 15-acre (61,000 m^{2}) temple has a main vimanam with stucco images on the east side and 3 prakarams (outer courtyard). The outer 3rd prakaram (outer courtyard) is a wide courtyard. In the 2nd middle prakaram (outer courtyard) shrines for Lord Subramanya and his consorts Valli and Deivaanai are found. Shiva is called Tiruttalinathar, Sreetalinathar and the Ambal, while his mother Parvathy is called Sivakami, Soundarya Nayaki.

The shrine is elevated and faces east. The shrine for Sivagami is situated parallel to the north of the main sanctum and faces east. The mandapam in front of the sanctum has pillars with beautiful sculptured images of Rishabavaaganar, Narthana Ganapathy, Venugpolan and Narasimhar. Metal images of Rama, Sita and Lakshmana are seen there, as are stone images of Nataraja and Sivakami. The Yoga Bhairavar shrine (facing West) has metal images of Rama, Sita and Lakshmana. The Navagrahams are in a seated posture.

Entering the 3rd inner prakaram (outer courtyard) from the east side, reveals shrines for Sun God Sooriyan, Mahalakshmi, Mahaganapathy, Dakshinamurthy, Varunalingam, Visalakshmi Amman, Agasthiyalingam, Sandeswarar and Durgai on the four pathways of the prakaram (outer courtyard). The sthala vriksham is Konrai tree and the Theertham is called Garuda Theertham.

The two circular pilasters with circular shafts on four sides of the vimana indicate the temple's antiquity. This feature is possibly termed Vrittasputitas in silpa texts like Shilparatna, and is found only in few other temples like Neyyadiappar Temple, Tillaistanam, central shrine in Moovar Koil in Kodumbalur, Vijayalaya Choleeswaram in Narthamalai, Anantheswara temple in Udayarkudi, and Kampaheswarar Temple, Thirubuvanam.

== Poetry ==
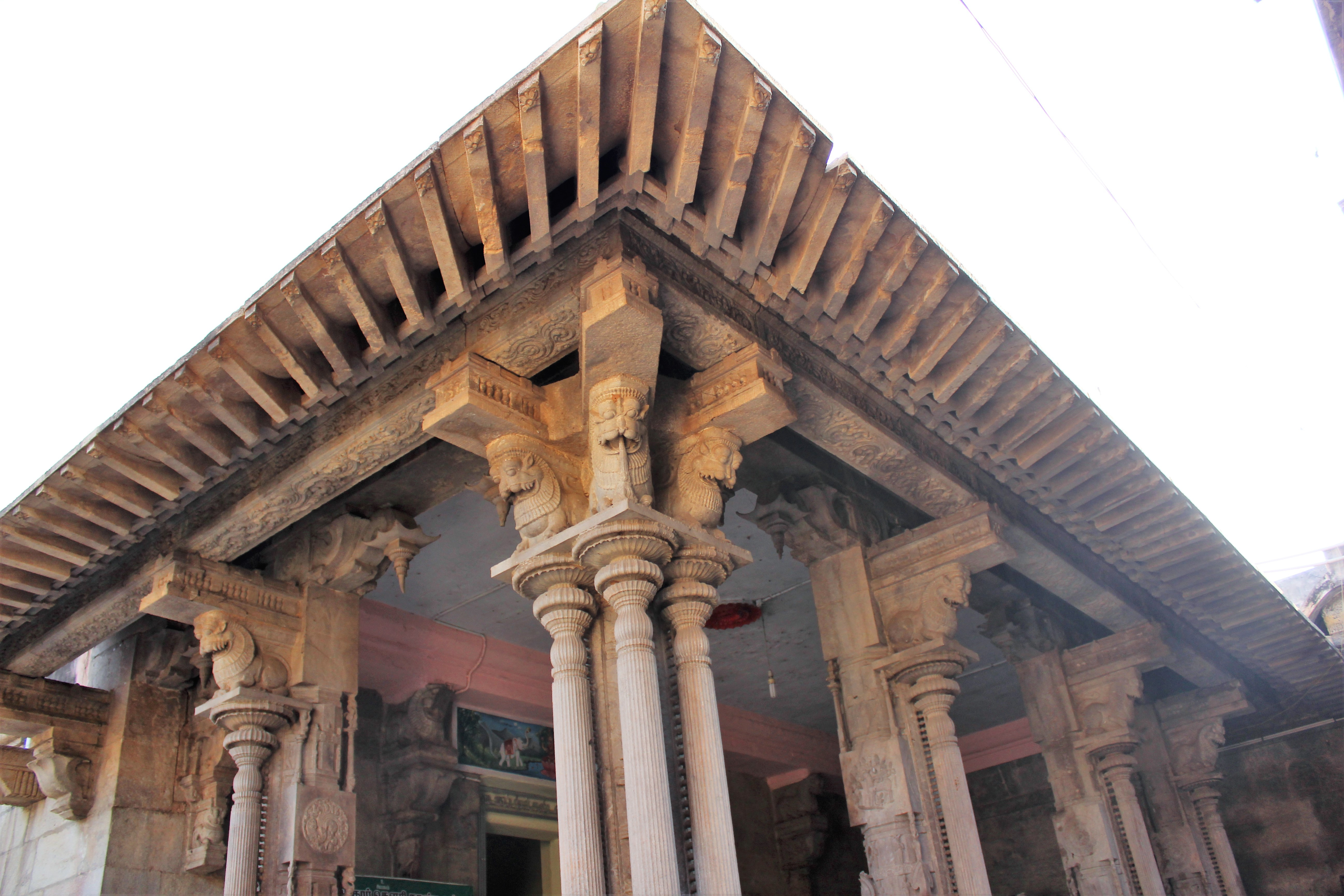
Shrines in the campus

Sambandar and Appar composed the thevara Pathigam here.

== Festivals ==
The Jayantan Festival is celebrated on the first Friday in the Tamil month of Chittirai. In addition to this Vinayaka Chaturthi, Navaratri, Kartikai Deepam, Arudra Darisanam and Vaikasi Visaakam are celebrated here .

== Location ==
This temple is between Madurai and Karaikudi, and can be reached by road from either place. It is about 65 km from Madurai, 20 km from Karaikudi, and about 35 km from Sivagangai.

== Photogallery ==
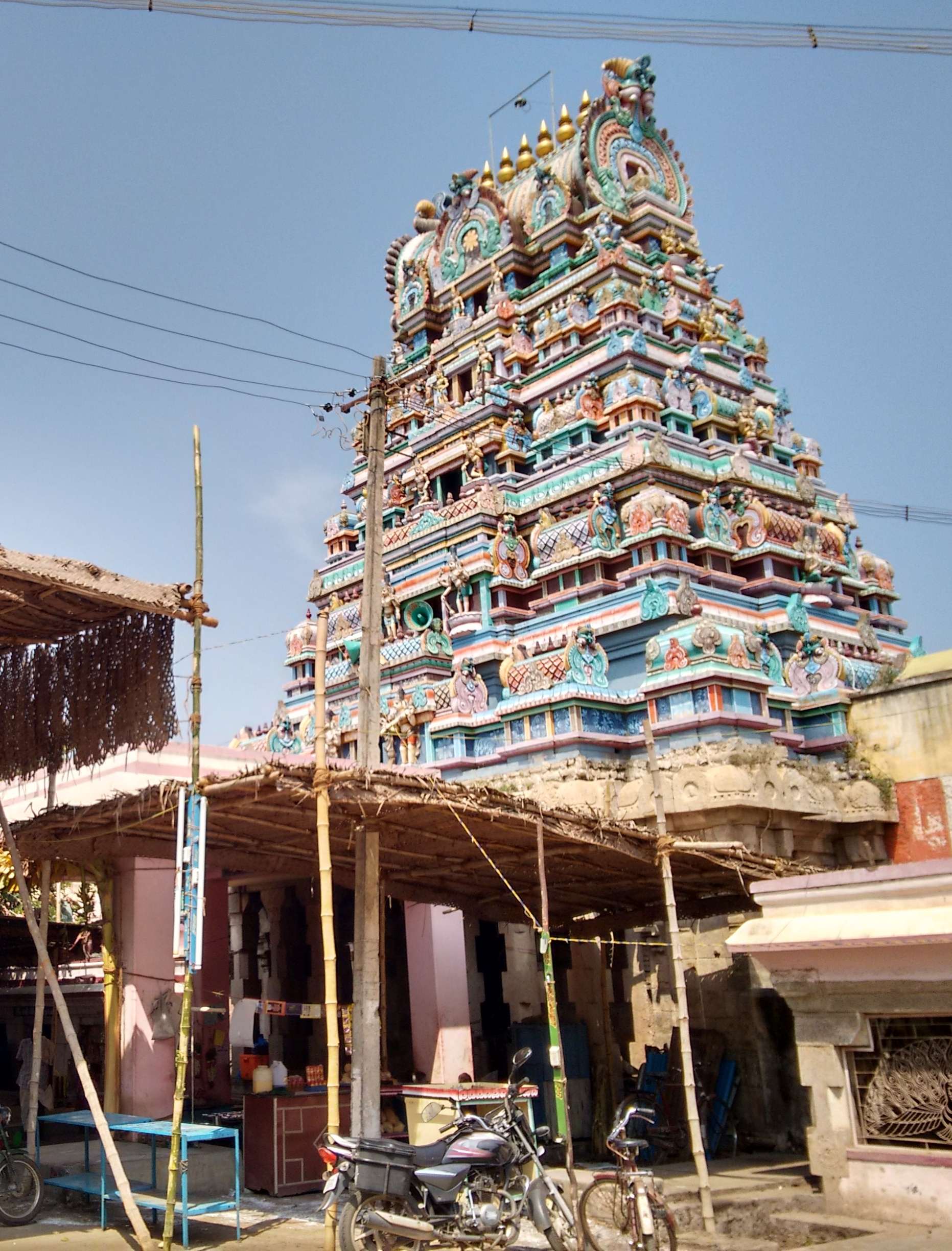
Rajagopura

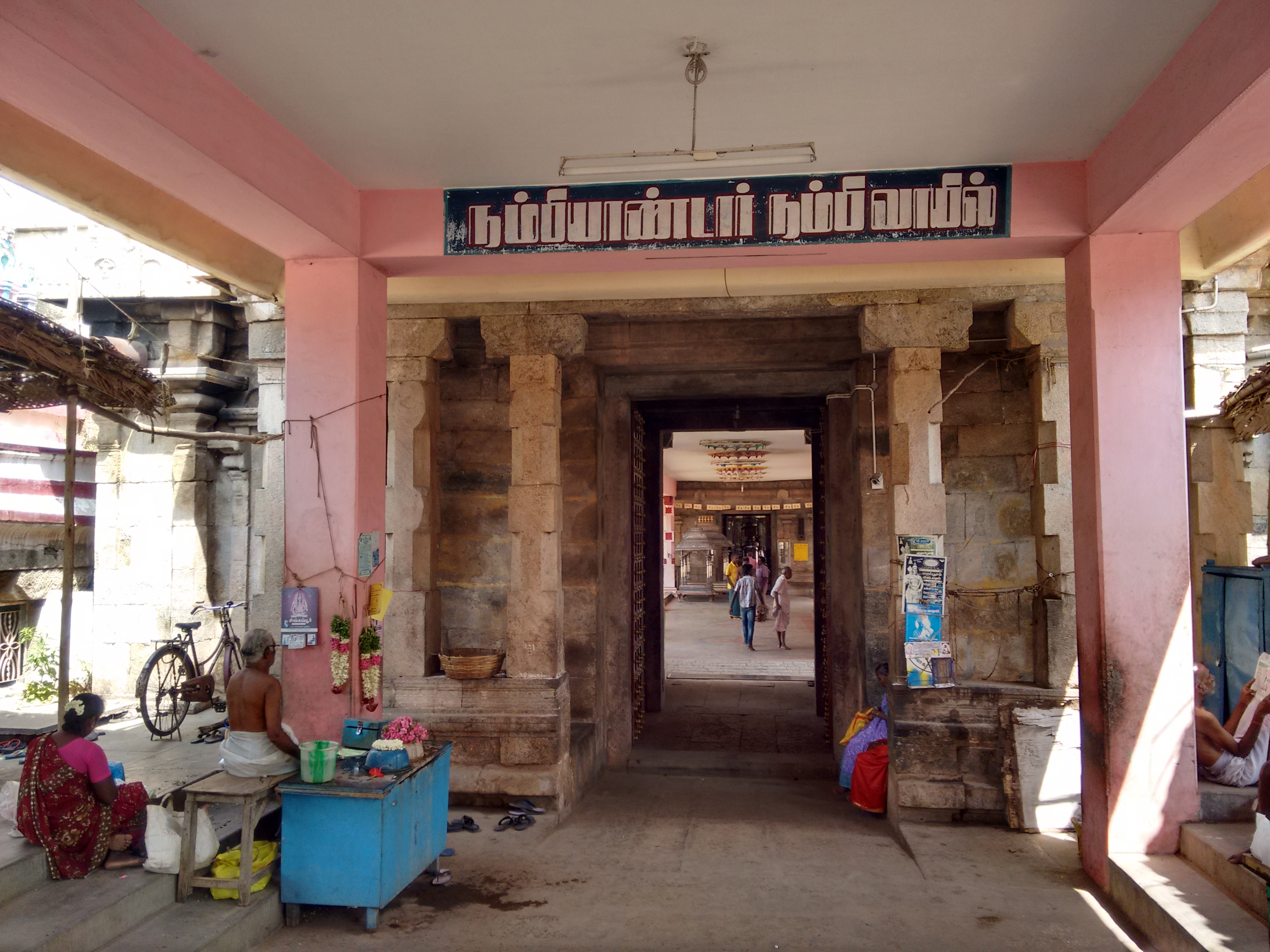
Entrance

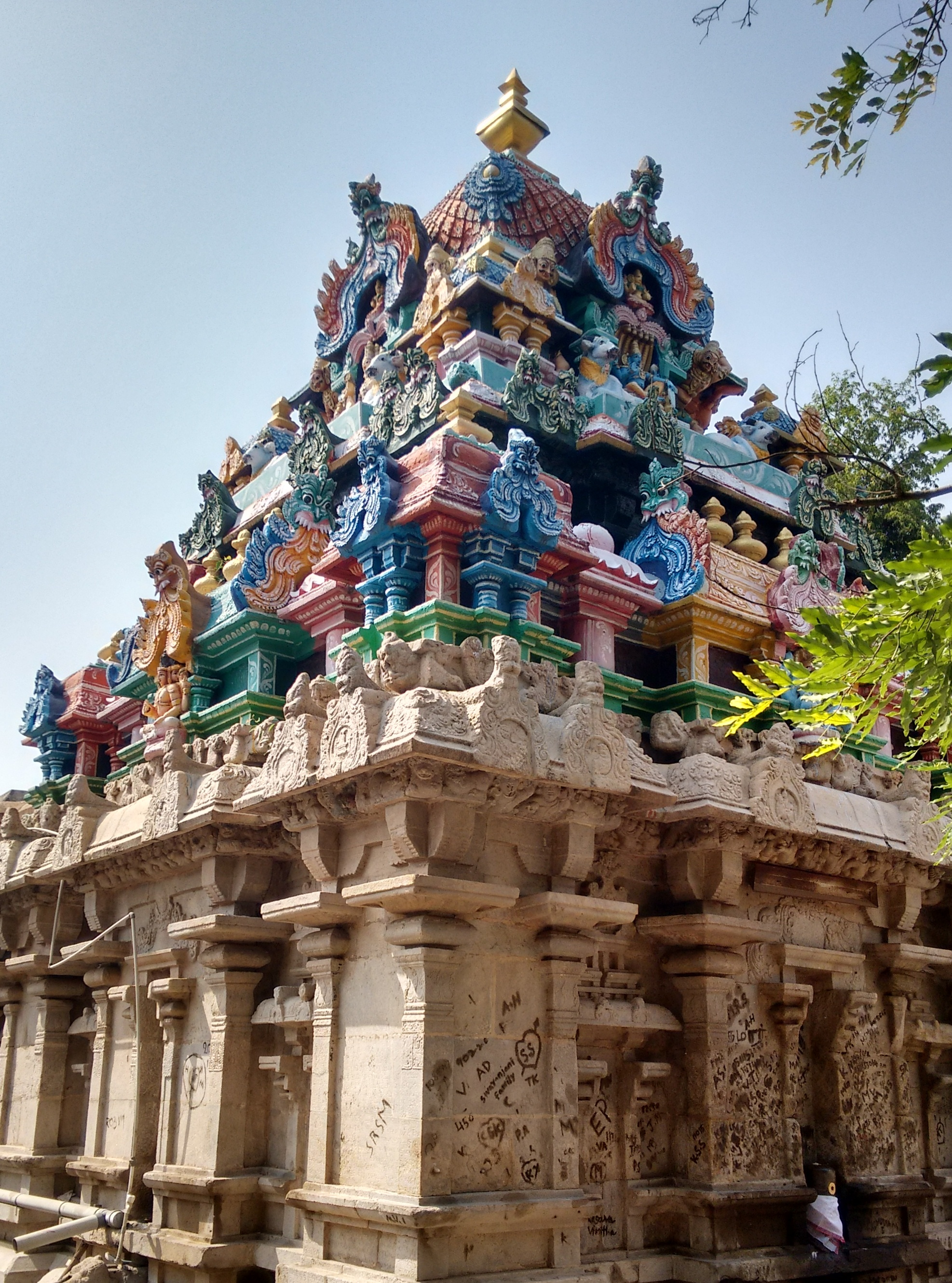
Vimana of presiding deity

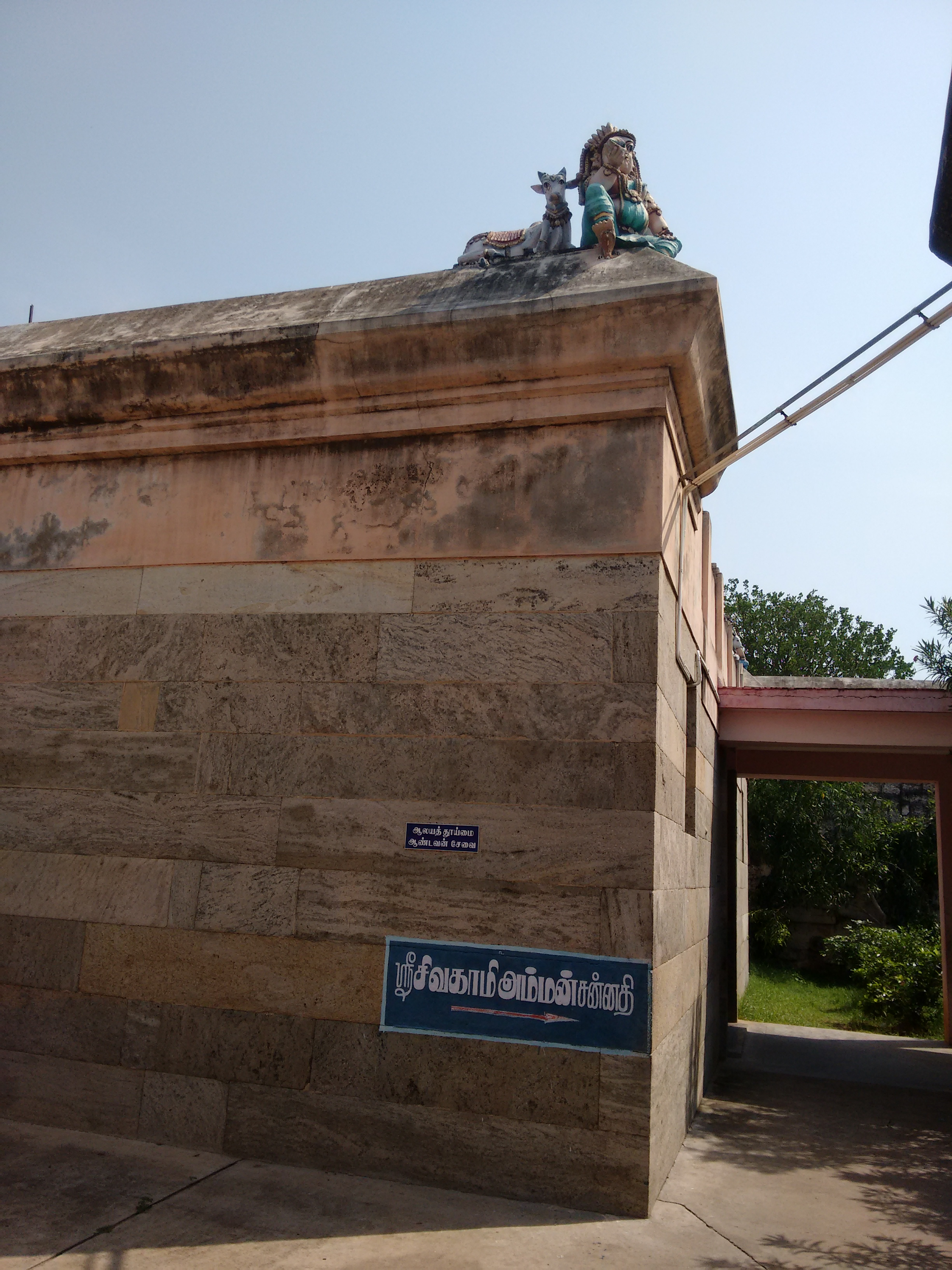
Goddess shrine

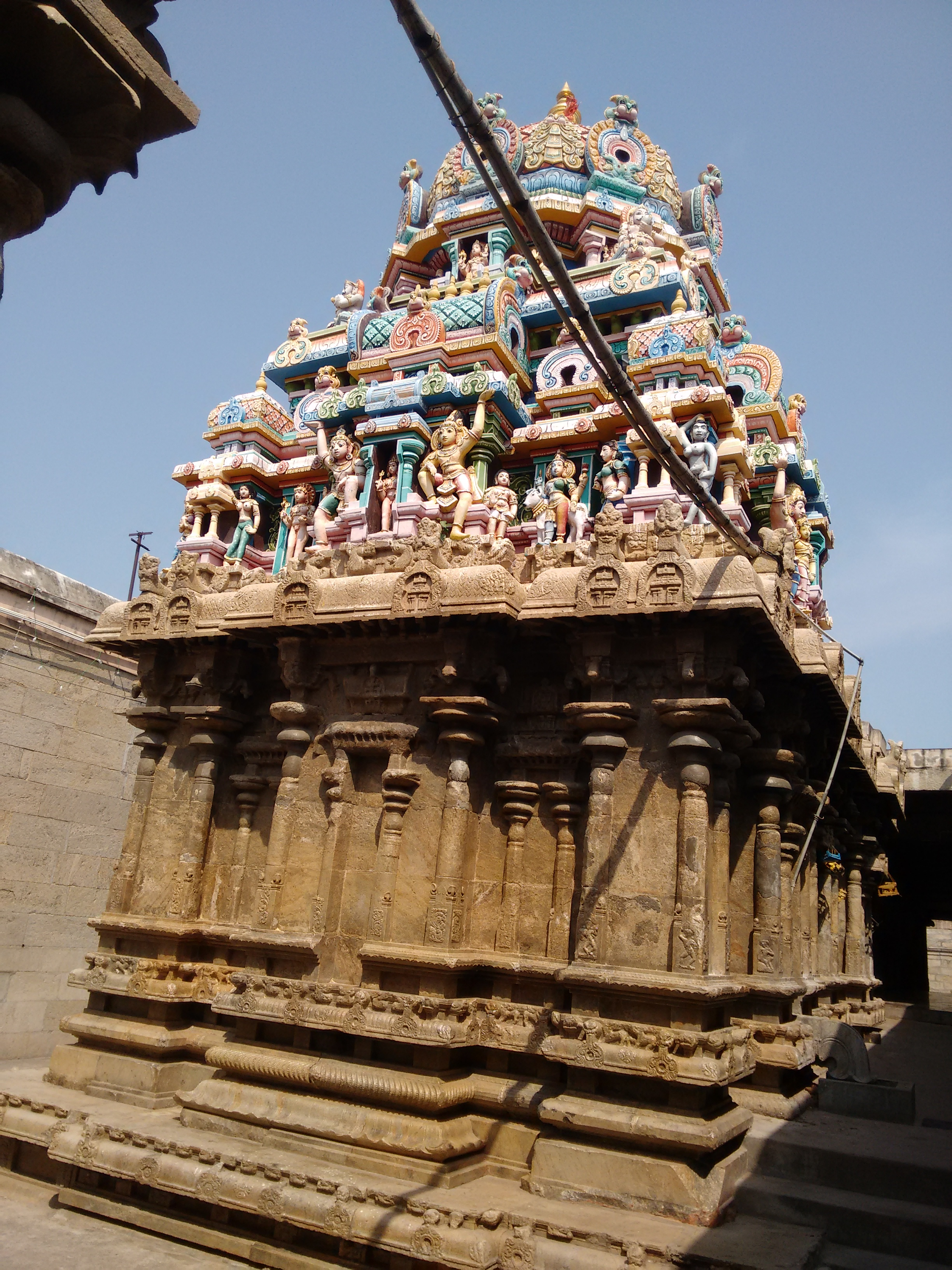
Vimana of Bairava

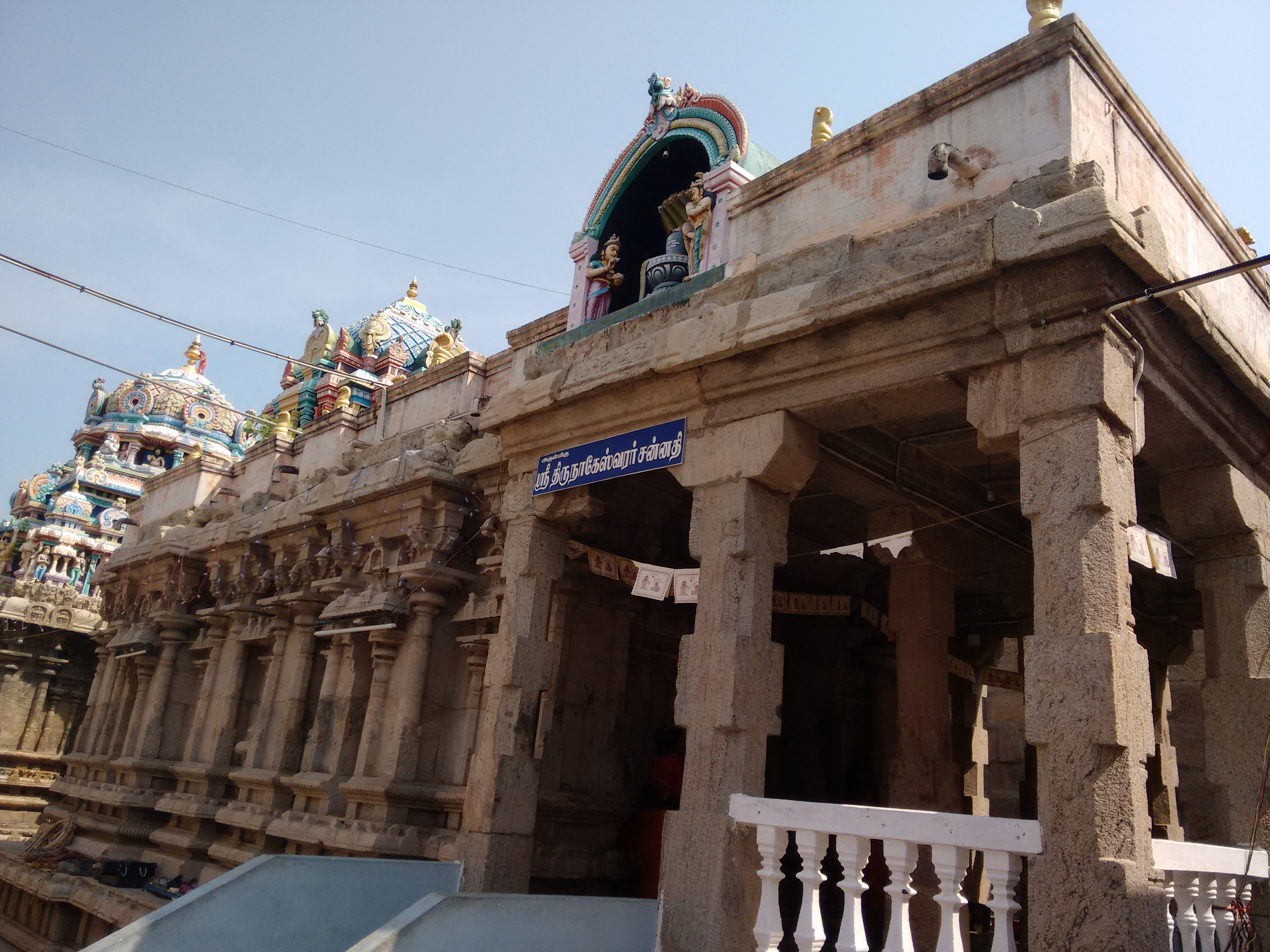
Nagesvara shrine

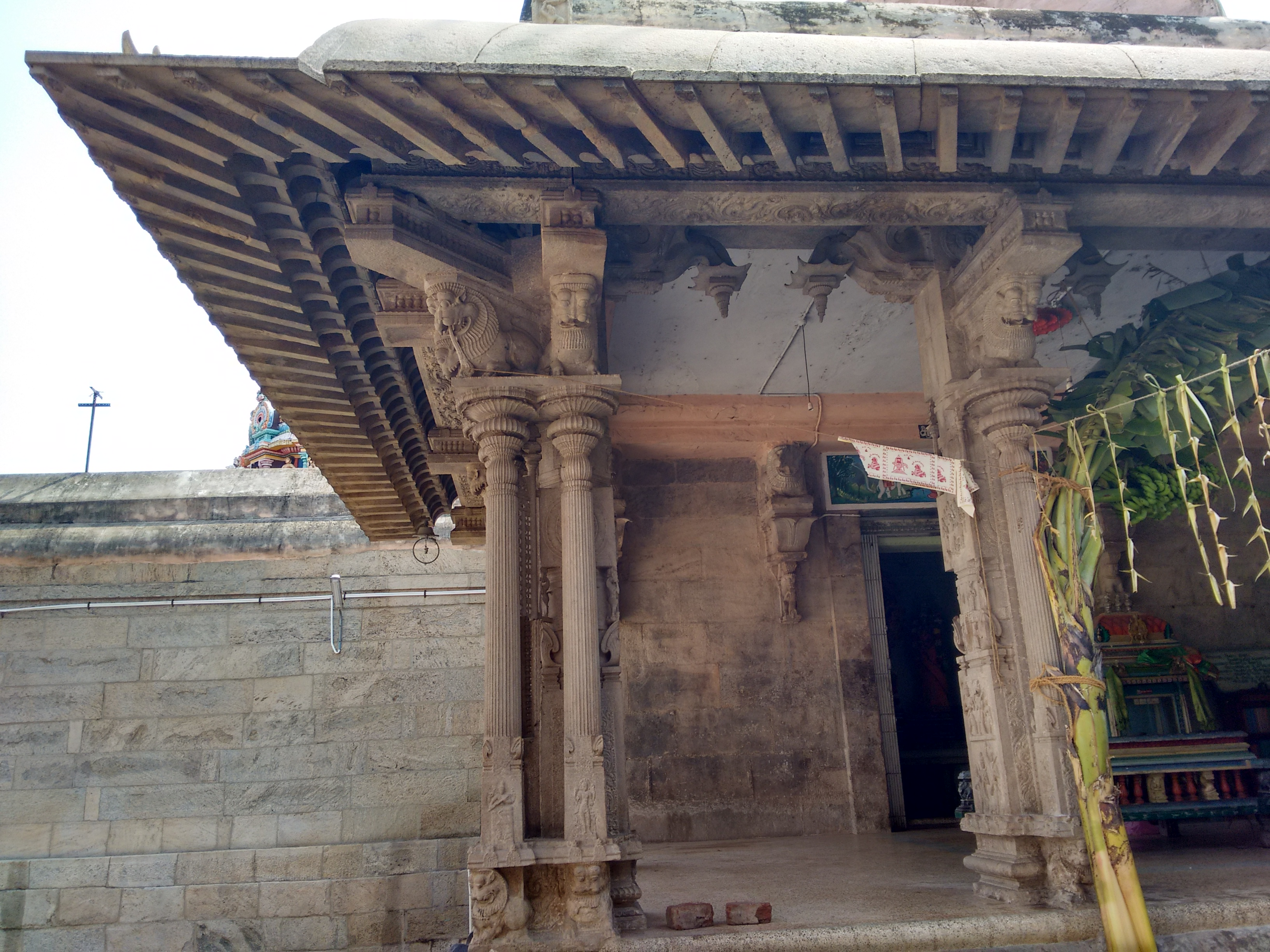
Nataraja shrine
