= Vijayalaya Choleeswaram =

Temples in Tamil Nadu, India

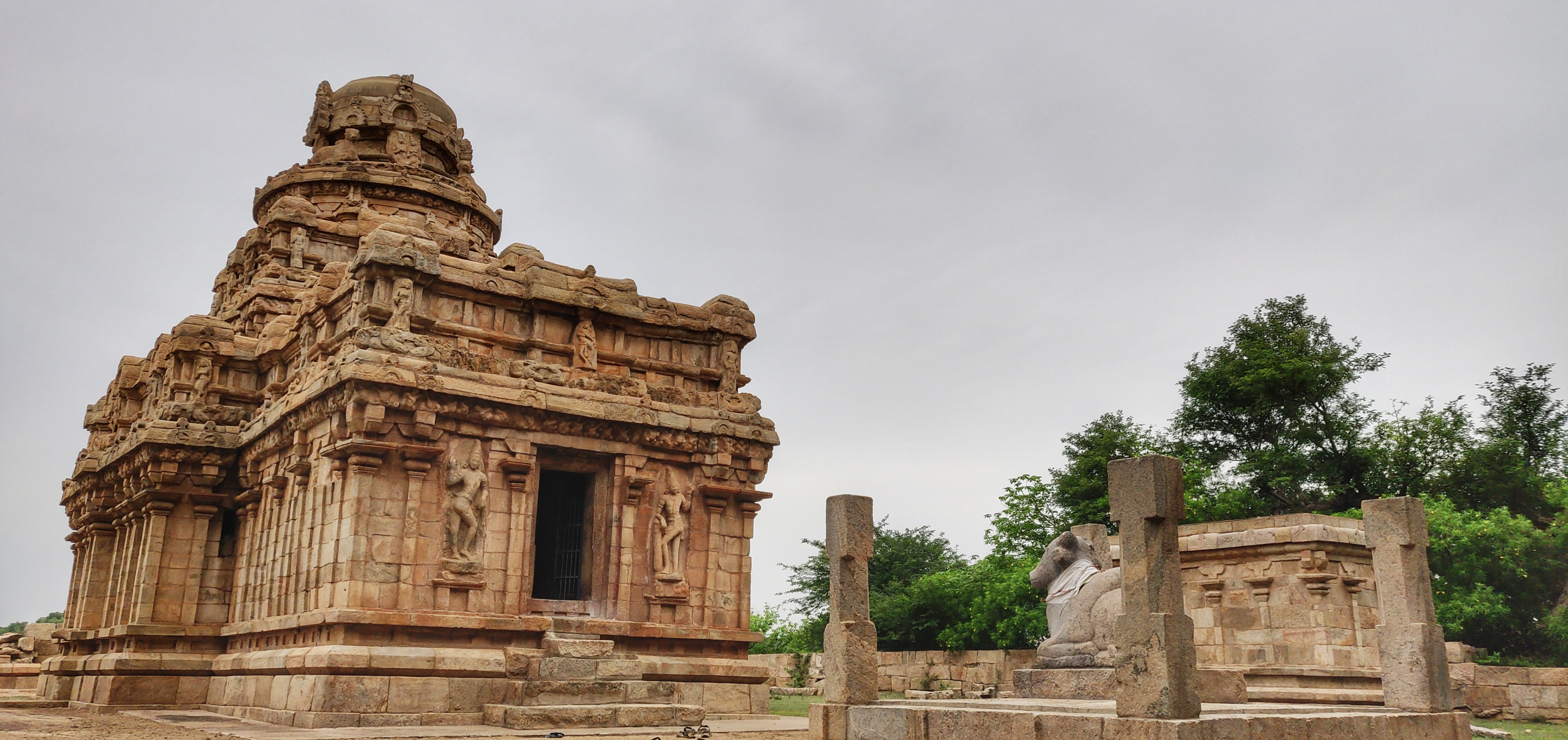

- Location in Tamil Nadu

Religion
- Affiliation: Hinduism
- District: Pudukottai

Location
- Location: Narthamalai
- State: Tamil Nadu
- Country: India
- Coordinates: 10°30′17″N 78°45′28″E

Architecture
- Type: Nagara architecture, Rock cut

Vijayalaya Choleeswaram in Narthamalai, a panchayat town in Pudukottai district in the South Indian state of Tamil Nadu, India, is a temple dedicated to the Hindu god Shiva, Vishnu and houses the 8th century Jaina Abode. The temple is considered one of the oldest stone temples in South India. The other portions of Narthamalai houses the 8th century Jaina Abode, the Aluruttimalai Jain Caves. The Temple is Constructed in the Dravida style and rock cut architecture, the temple is believed to have been built during the 9th century by Mutharaiyar dynasty kings, the feudatories of the Pallavas, with later expansion from the Cholas. The rock-cut architecture is an early example of Cholan Art, continuing the tradition of the Pallavas.

The temple is maintained and administered by Department of Archaeological Survey of India as a protected monument.

== History ==
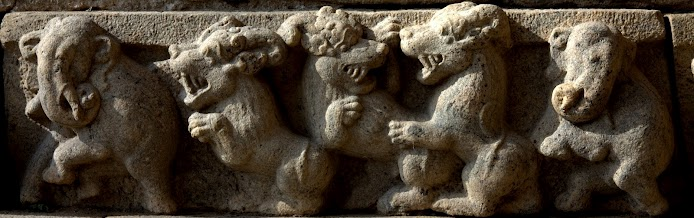
Image of pilasters on the lower part of the vimana

Narthamalai was originally called Nagaratharmalai on account of the business men (called Nagarathar in Tamil) who were active in business in the Trichy – Pudukottai – Madurai regions. The Nagarathars are attributed to the major contributions in terms of the canals, temples, and religious establishments in the region. Narthamalai was ruled from the 7th to 9th centuries by the Mutharaiyars who were feudatories of the Pallavas. The region was later captured by Medieval Cholas.

Though the temple is called Vijayalaya Choleeswaram, the temple was originally built by Muttaraiyar lieutenant, Sattan Paliyili, during the seventh regnal year of Pallava king Nripatungavarman during 862 CE. As per some accounts, the temple is believed to have been built by the first king of Medieval Cholas, Vijayalaya Chola (850–891 CE), but the view is highly debated. As per the inscriptions, immediately after the construction, the temple was damaged by rains and lightning. The restoration work was carried out by Tennavan Tamiladirayan, aka Pallan Anantan.

In modern times, the temple is maintained and administered by archaeological department of India as a protected monument.

== Architecture ==
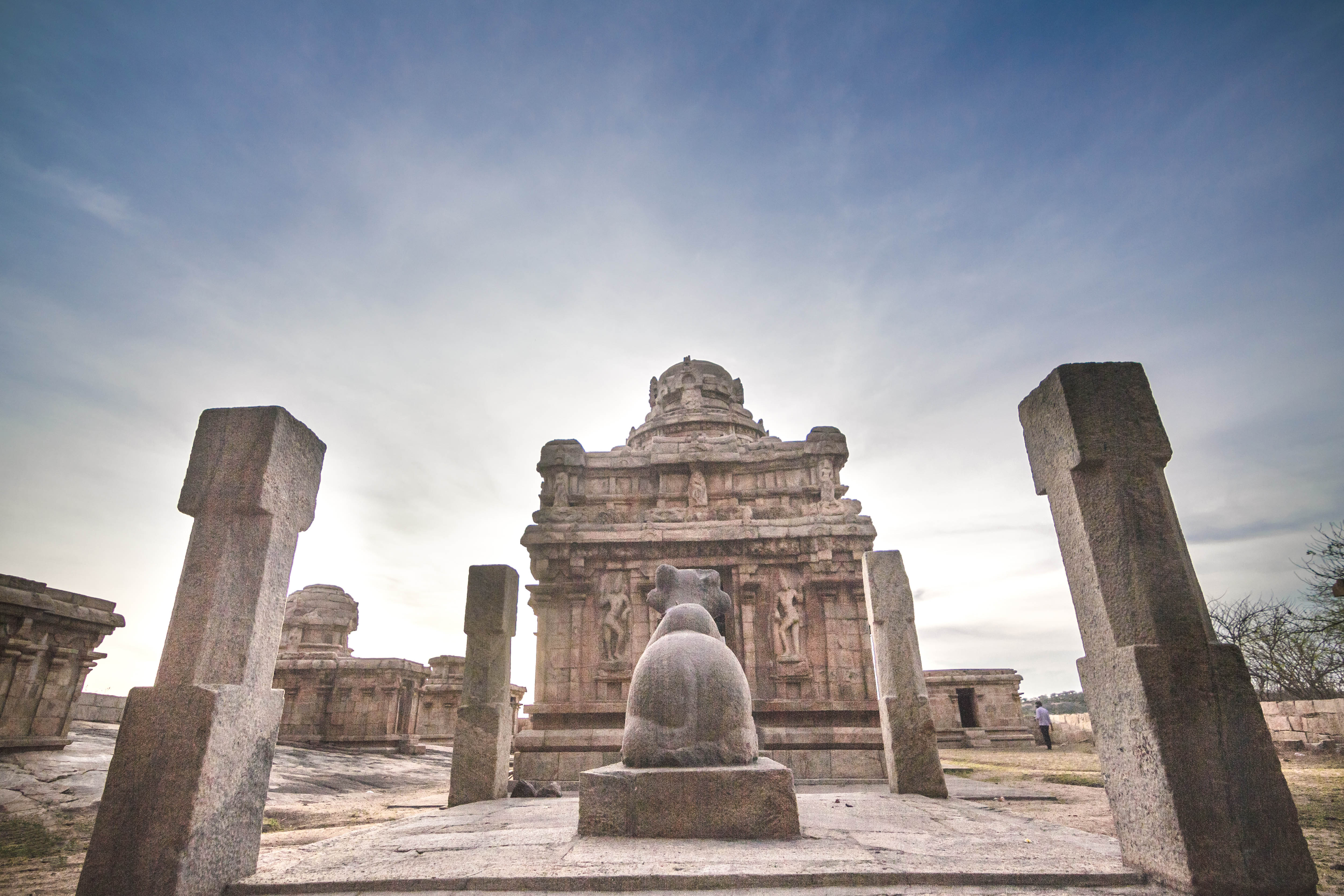
Front view of Vijayalaya Choleeswaram

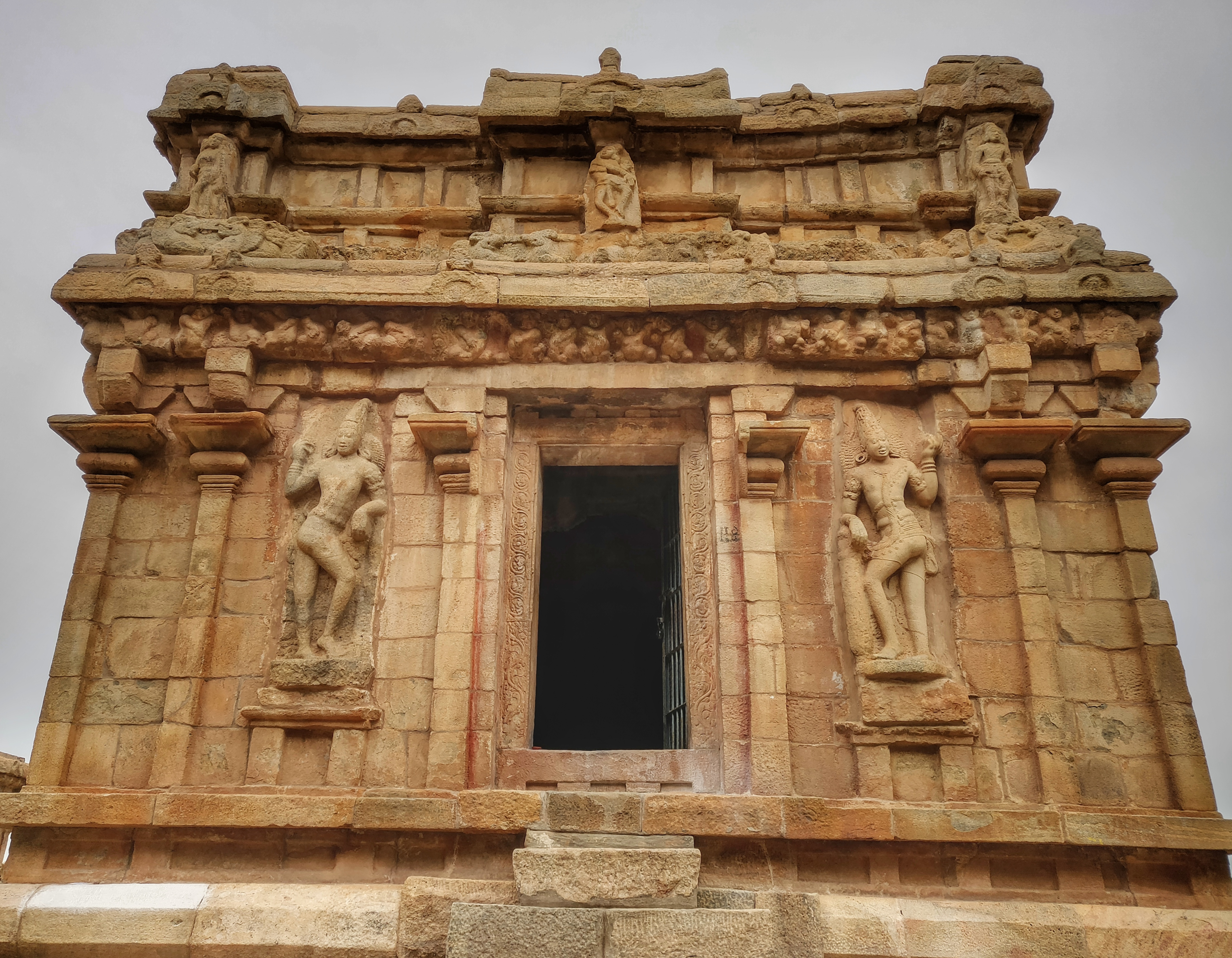
Entrance gateway of the main shrine

The temple is located in Narthamalai, a rockyhill in Pudukottai district in southern Tamil Nadu. There are 3 main structures present in the Vijayalaya Choleeswaram. There is a temple, A rock-cut cave Temple and other Rock cut cave for Jains. The First cave is dedicated to Vishnu which houses twelve life-size sculptures of Maha Vishnu. The structure dedicated to Vishnu is the oldest among the other complexes present in and around the temple. The 12 Vishnus are considered as the first 12 names of the Chaturvimshatimurti also commonly used by the Yajurvedis during Achamana.

There are two rock-cut caves, one of which houses twelve life size sculptures of Vishnu. The two circular pilasters with circular shafts on four sides of the vimana indicates the antiquity of the temple. The feature is possibly termed Vrittasputitas in silpa texts like Shilparatna. Such a feature is otherwise found only in few other temples like Neyyadiappar Temple, Tillaistanam, Tiruttalinathar Temple in Thiruputhur, central shrine in Moovar Koil in Kodumbalur, Anantheswara temple in Udayarkudi and Kampaheswarar Temple, Thirubuvanam.

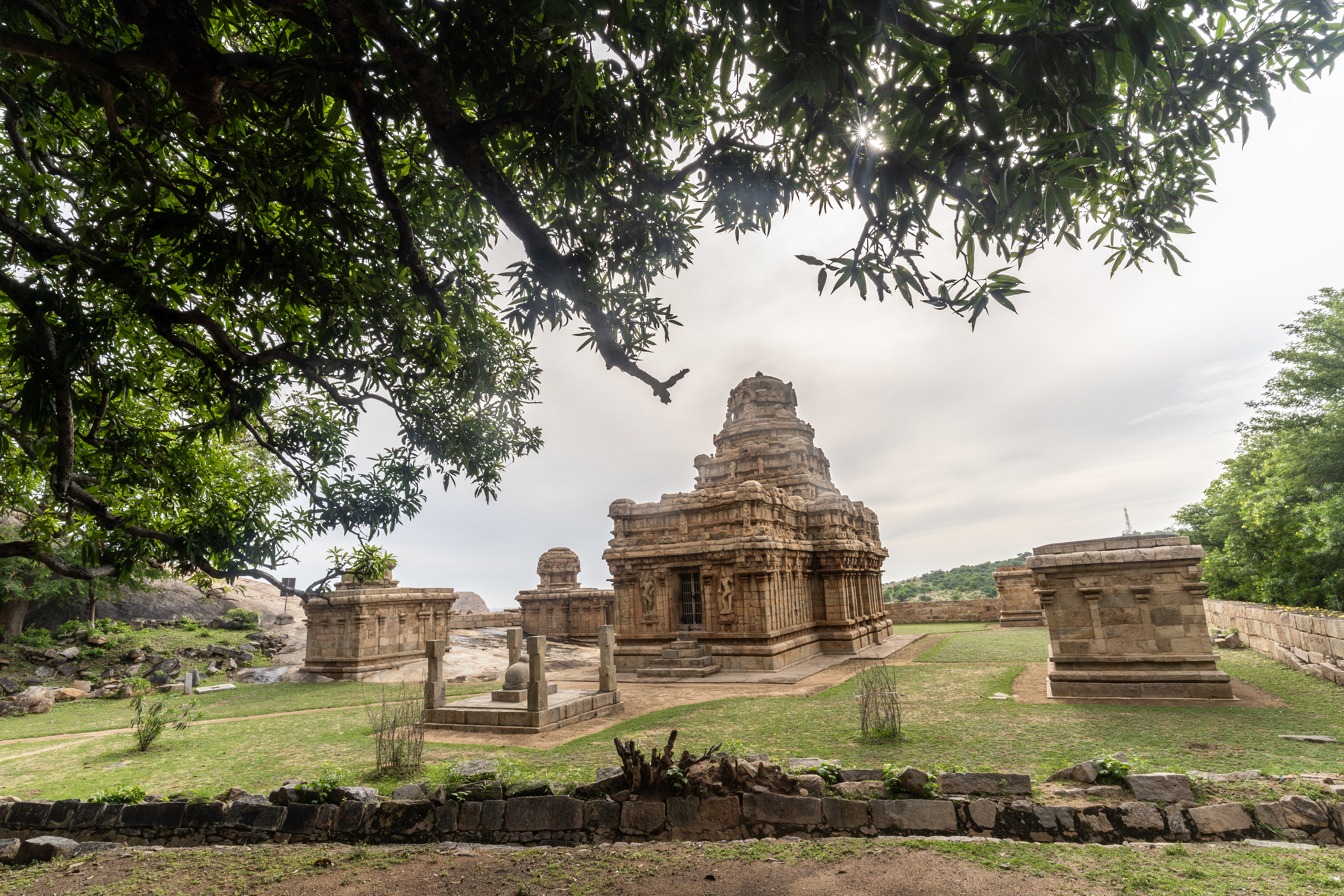
Image of temple with shrines around it

It was declared a World Heritage Site by UNESCO. The temple is first among South Indian temples to incorporate dravida and Vasara styles to be incorporated in the vimana.

== Gallery ==
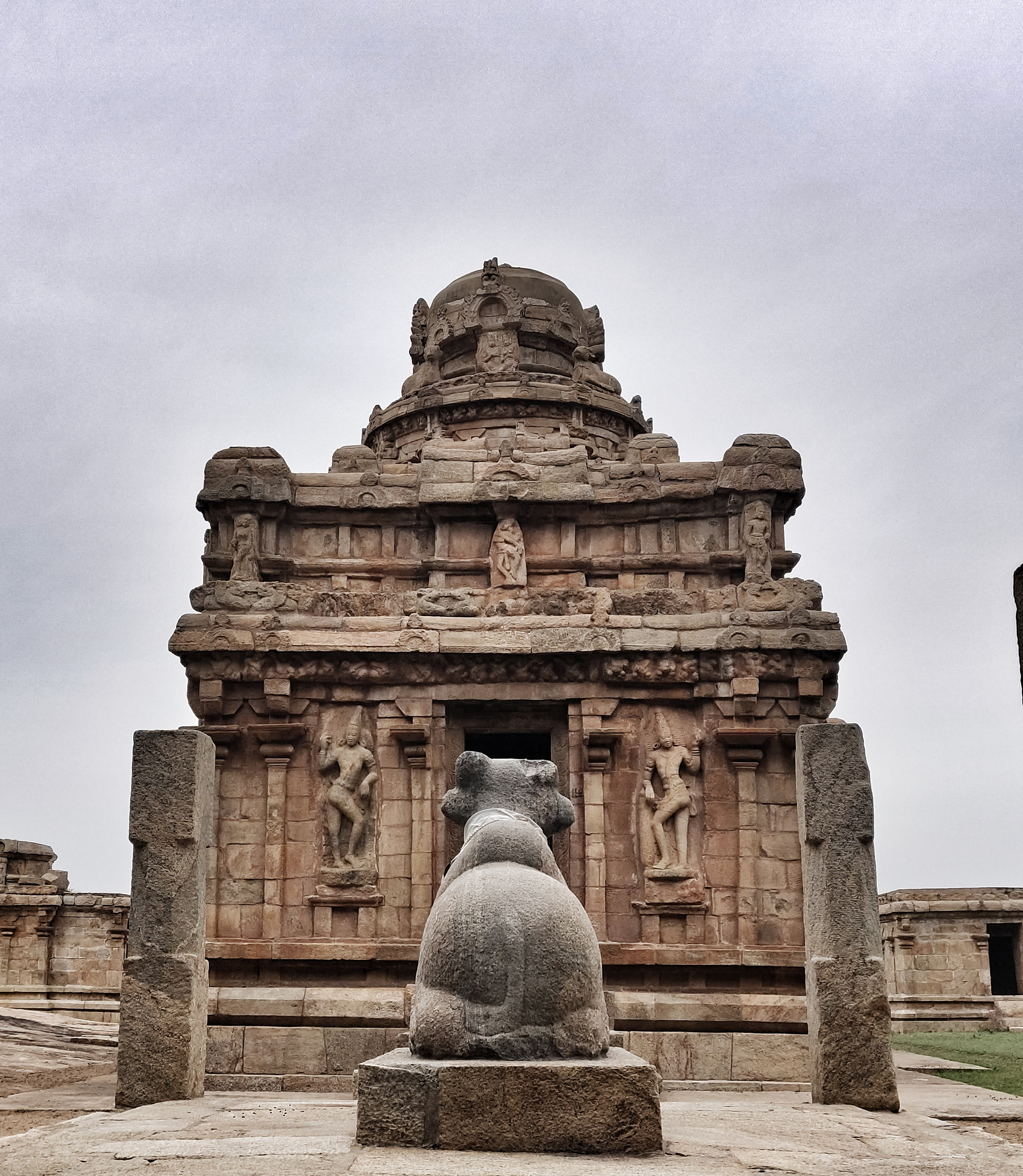
Nandhi at Narthamalai temple

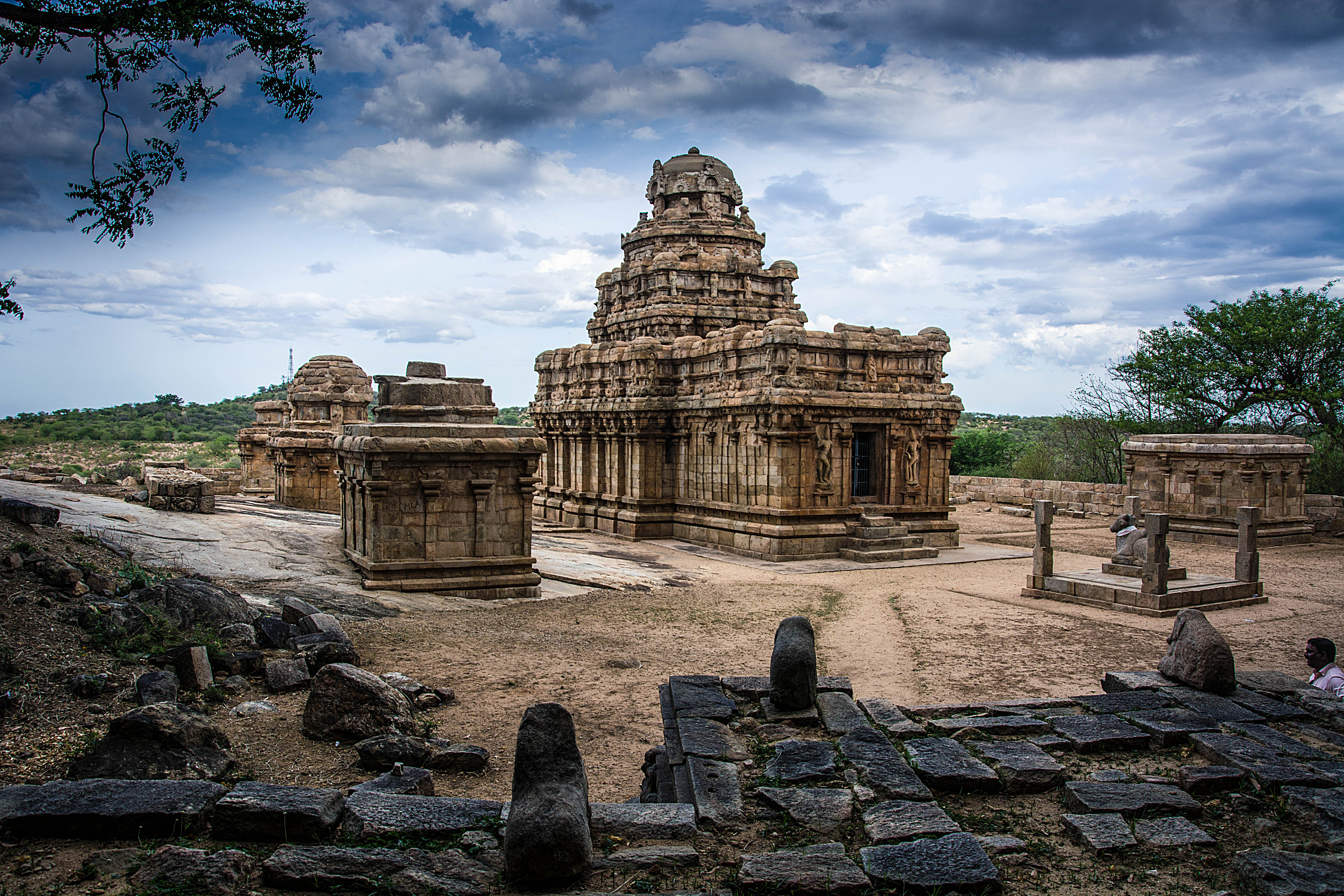
Full view of Vijayalaya Choleeswaram

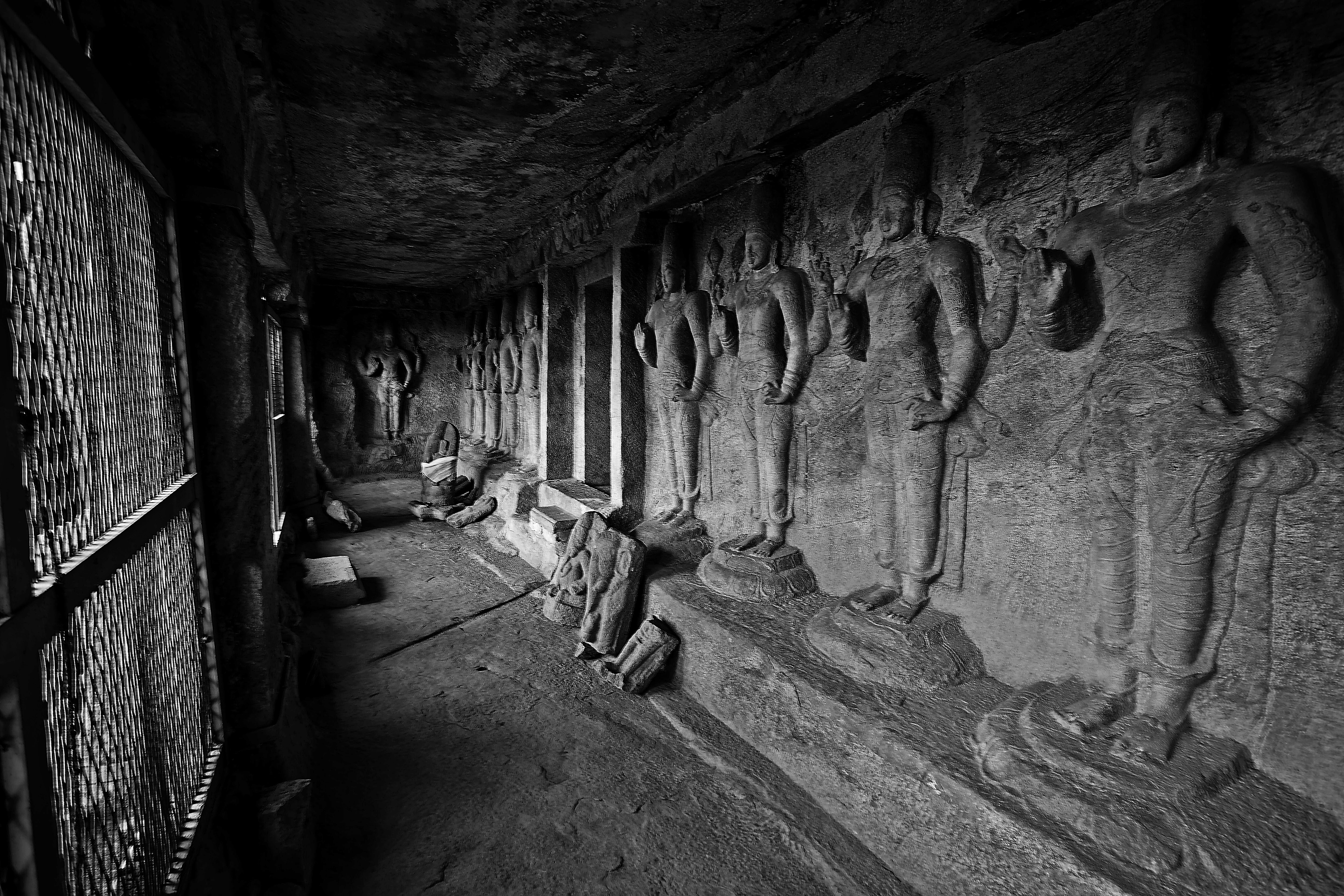
12 live sized images of Vishnu

Sculpture of the Dvarapalaka

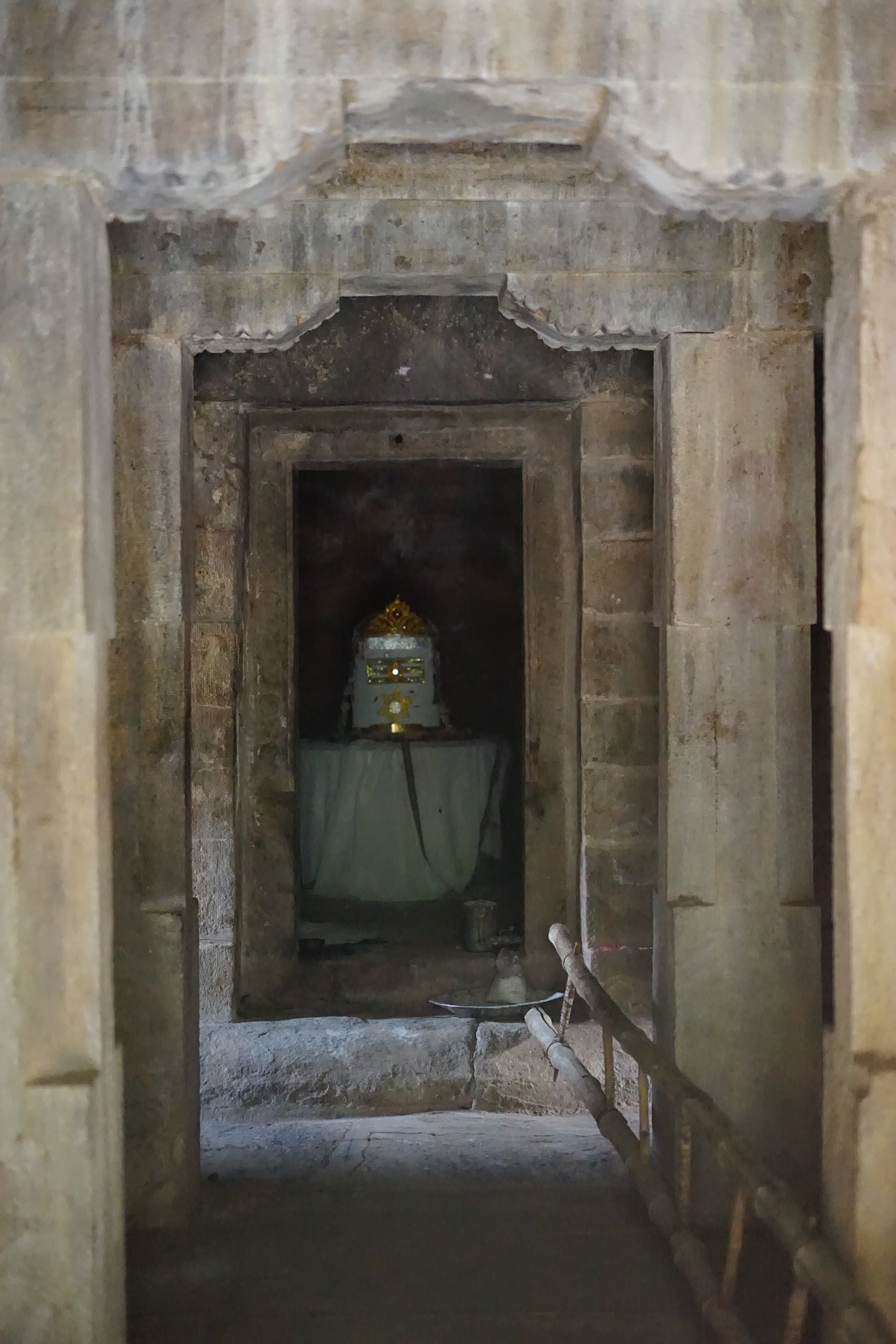
Shiva Lingam At Narthamalai

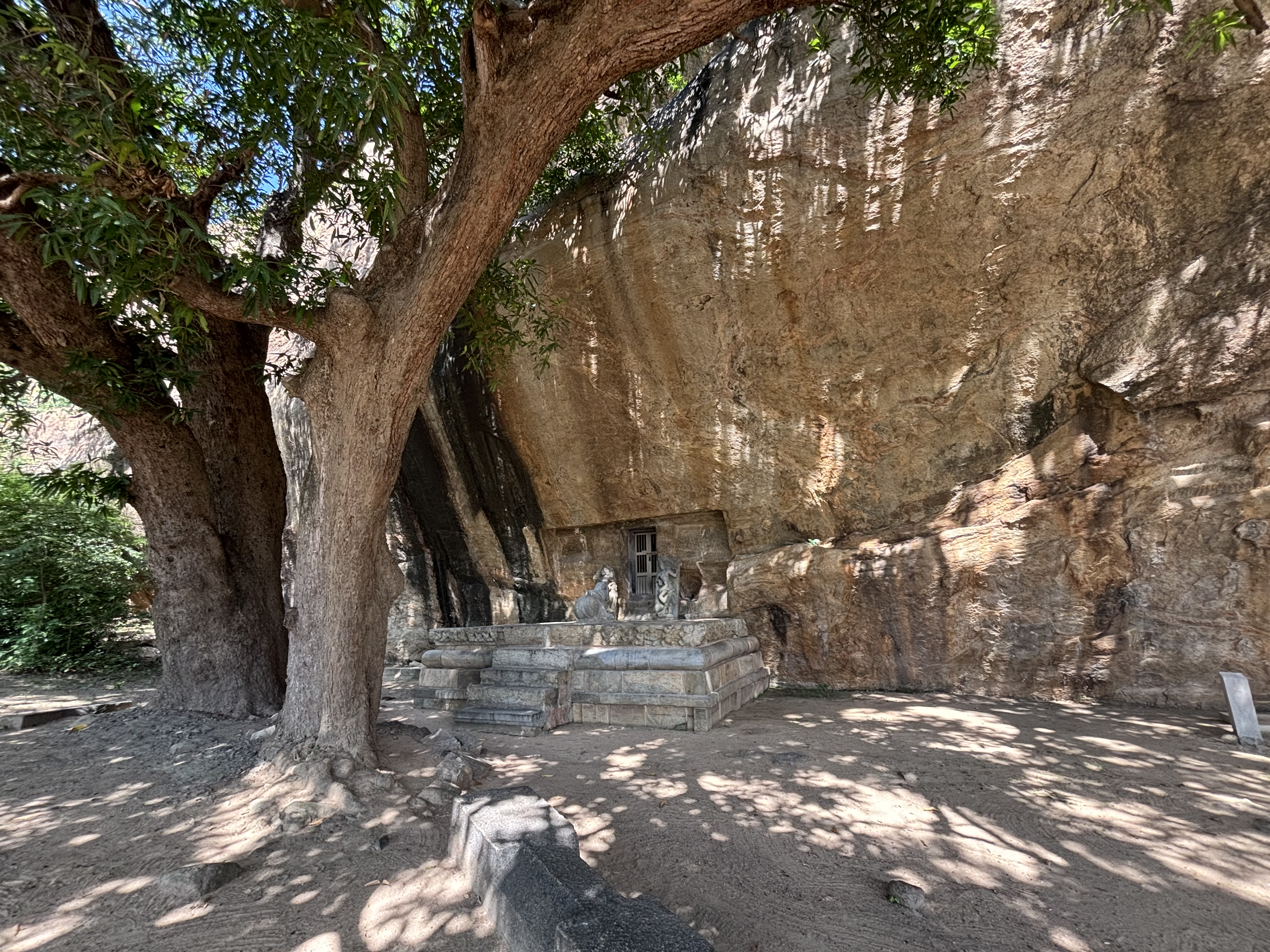
Aluruttimalai Jain Caves
