= Tiruppattur, Sivaganga =

Thiruppathur Tiruppathur or Thiruppathur
- Town Panchayat
- Entrance to Thirupathur

- Location in Tamil Nadu, India
- Coordinates: 10.13°N 78.62°E
- Country: India
- State: Tamil Nadu
- District: Sivaganga
- Elevation: 88 m (289 ft)

Population (2011)
  - Total: 25,980

Languages
  - Official: Tamil
- Time zone: UTC+5:30 (IST)
- PIN: 630211
- Telephone code: 04577
- Vehicle registration: TN-63
- Nearest city: Karaikudi

Tiruppattur, also spelt Tiruppathur or Thiruppathur, is a Taluk, Town Panchayat in Sivaganga district in the India state of Tamil Nadu. This town is located 22 km from Karaikudi and 27 km from Sivaganga. The town is renowned for the famous Thiruthalinathar Temple, a Padal petra sthalam of Tevaram, the sixth of 14 in the Pandyan region.

== Geography ==
Tiruppathur is one of the main towns in Sivaganga district on the Karaikudi – Dindigul, Madurai – Karaikudi, Madurai – Tanjore, Manamadurai-vikravandi Highway. It is one of the oldest Towns in the Pandyan Kingdom. It served as one of the British HQs later. It was changed from Panchayat to town panchayat. The city is connected only by Roadways. The Virusuliyar River flows through Kumangudi. It is 290 km from Coimbatore, 100 km from Trichy, 60 km from Madurai, and 400 km from Chennai, 50 km from Pudukkottai. Tiruppathur is the capital town of Thiruppathur taluk. It is located near to Karaikudi City, at 10.13°N 78.62°E. It has an average elevation of 88 m (289 ft).

== History ==
It also houses several ancient historic temples like Sri Thiruthalinathar Swamy Temple. (Vairavar/Sivan Temple) Sri Ninra Narayanaperumal Temple has served as a place promoting Vaishnavism. During the rule of King Varaguna Pandiyan II (862–885) a Perumal temple had been existence in this place. Lord Perumal installed in this temple is referred to as Jalasayanathupadarar in the inscriptions of King Varaguna Pandiyan II. In addition to this temple, for the sake of Lord Perumal in the standing posture, another Perumal temple was constructed in the south of Sri Thiruthalinathar temple during the Pandiya period. It contains inscriptions of later Pandiyas dating back to the 13th century. The inscription of King Maravarman Sundara Pandiyan (1216–1239 A.D) refers to this other temple as Kola Varaga Vinnagara Emperumal temple and donation of lands in 1237 A.D.

== Demographics ==
As of 2011 India census, Thiruppathur had a population of 25,980. Males constitute 50% of the population and females 50%. Thiruppathur has an average literacy rate of 82%, higher than the national average of 69.5%: male literacy is 83%, and female literacy is 79%. In Thiruppathur, 11% of the population is under 6 years of age.

== Politics ==
Thiruppathur assembly constituency is part of Sivaganga (Lok Sabha constituency).

Member of Parliament (Lok Sabha): Karthi. P. Chidambaram
Member of Legislative Assembly: Thiru. Seenivasa Sethupathi,
Chairman of Panchayat: Thirumathi. Kokilarani narayanan , Thiruppathur Town panchayat Chairman
Vice Chairman of Panchayat: Thiru. R.Khanmohammed.Thiruppathur Town panchayat President of Special Village Panchayat: Thiru. Manivasagam
Vice President of Special Village Panchayat: K.S athiya moorthy

== New rail line proposal ==
Madurai–Melur–Tirupattur–Karaikudi new BG line: As sanctioned by Railway Board in the year 2007–08, survey was taken & the report was submitted to Railway Board on 29/07/2008. Then updating survey was sanctioned in the year 2013–14 and the survey report was submitted to Railway Board on 27/11/2014. Railway Board has shelved the proposal at present. Decision of Railway Board is awaited.

== Administration ==
BDO Name : Thirumathi. Jeyanthi

== Tourist spots ==
- Vettangudi Bird Sanctuary: This .384 km^{2} (0.1 sq mi) protected area, declared in June 1977, near Thirupattur in Sivaganga district includes the Periya Kollukudi Patti, Chinna Kollukudi Patti and Vettangudi Patti Irrigation tanks. The sanctuary is the natural habitat of winter migratory and residential birds and provides a safe place for roosting, breeding and feeding. There is considerable diversity in their nesting and feeding behaviour.
- Kundragudi Five Cave Temples: Below the Hills there are 5 cave temples maintained by Archaeological Department with ancient coloured sculptures
- Piranmalai hills
- Tirumayam fort
- Mahatma Gandhi Statue is a famous landmark
- st Antony church at Thenma nager(more than 300 years old)
- pillayarpatti karpagavinayagar temple located 10km from Thiruppathur Town.The image of Karpaga vinayagar is carved out in a cave of pillayarpatti Hillrocks in this village.

== Hospitals ==
- Swedish Mission Hospital, Anna Salai
- Government Hospital, Madurai Road
- Lakshmi Nursing Home, Madurai Road
- SMR Hospital, Madurai Road
- A.R. herbal care
- Jeyam scans

== Education ==
Tirupathur hosts many schools and colleges. They are:

=== Schools ===
- Arumugam Pillai Government Boys Higher Secondary School
- Nagappa Maruthappa Girls Government Higher Secondary School
- APSA Matriculation Higher Secondary School
- Indira gandhi Nursery & Primary School
- LIMRA Nursery & Primary School
- Baba Amir Badusha Matriculation Higher Secondary School
- Christhuraja Matriculation School
- T.E.L.C Middle School, SMH Compound, Thirupputhur.
- T.E.L.C. Transitional School (polio Handicapped Children), Prabakar Colony, Thirupputhur. Ph : 04577–268500.
- T.E.L.C. Middle School for Blind, SMH Compound, Thirupputhur.
- RC Fathima Middle School, Thiruppattur
- Mount Zion Silver Jubilee Matriculation School
- Achrampatti Government School
- Government High School, Thenmapattu
- Government Primary School, Thenmapattu
- Government High School, T.Pudhupatti

=== Colleges ===
- APSA College Of Arts and Science
- APSA college of Education
- Arumugam Pillai Seethai Ammal College
- Arumugam Pillai Seethai Ammal College of Education
- Arumugam Pillai Seethai Ammal Teacher Training Institute
- Thavathiru Kundrakudi Adigalar College of Education for Women
- Vivekananda Polytechnic College
- Vivekananda College of Education
- S.M.S.Hr.Secondary School, Kilasavalpatti
- Achrampatti Gvt School

== Villages around Thiruppathur ==
1. Thenmapattu
2. Kaattaambur
3. kolichipatti
4. kandavarayan patti
5. Mangudi
6. T.Puduppatti
7. Kurumbaloor
8. N.Pudur
9. Avanipatti
10. T.Vairavanpatti
11. Thirukalapatti
12. A. Thekkur
13. S. Ilayathankudi
14. Muthur
15. Kallapettai
16. Nagappanpatti
17. Senpagampettai
18. Iraniyur
19. Nagalingampatti
20. Aripuram
21. Sirukoodalpatti
22. Sunnambiruppu
23. Vaiyakalathoor
24. Thirukolakudi
25. Sevinipatti
26. Olugamangalam
27. E. Ammapatti
28. kundrakudi
29. P. Karungulam
30. Keelasevalpatti
31. Nedumaram
32. Athirampatti
33. Konnathanpatti
34. N. Ilayathangudi
35. Mahibalanpatti
36. Manamelpatti
37. Kumarapettai
38. Brahamanapatti
39. Vadamavali
40. Alampatti
41. Kottaiyiruppu
42. Thiruvudaiyarpatti
43. Ranasingapuram
44. Sevur
45. Mathavarayanpatti
46. Karuppur
47. Thirukositur
48. K. Vairavanpatti
49. Vanjinipatti
50. Karaiyur
51. Viramathi
52. A. Velankudi
53. Poolankurichi
54. Pillaiyarpatti
55. Vaniankadu
56. Kandavarayanpatti
57. Thuvar
58. Oorkulathanpatti
59. Nattarmangalam
60. Acharampatti (School Street)
61. Tevarambur
62. Kannamangalapatti
63. Kummangudi
64. Kundeldalpatti
65. SS kottai
66. Vaiyapuripatti
67. Melaiyur Ayyappatti
68. E. Valaiyappatty
