= Narthamalai =

- village
- Location in Tamil Nadu, India Narthamalai (India)
- Coordinates: 10.51°N 78.76°E
- Country: India
- State: Tamil Nadu
- District: Pudukottai

Languages
  - Official: Tamil
- Time zone: UTC+5:30 (IST)
- Telephone code: 91-4322
- Vehicle registration: TN55

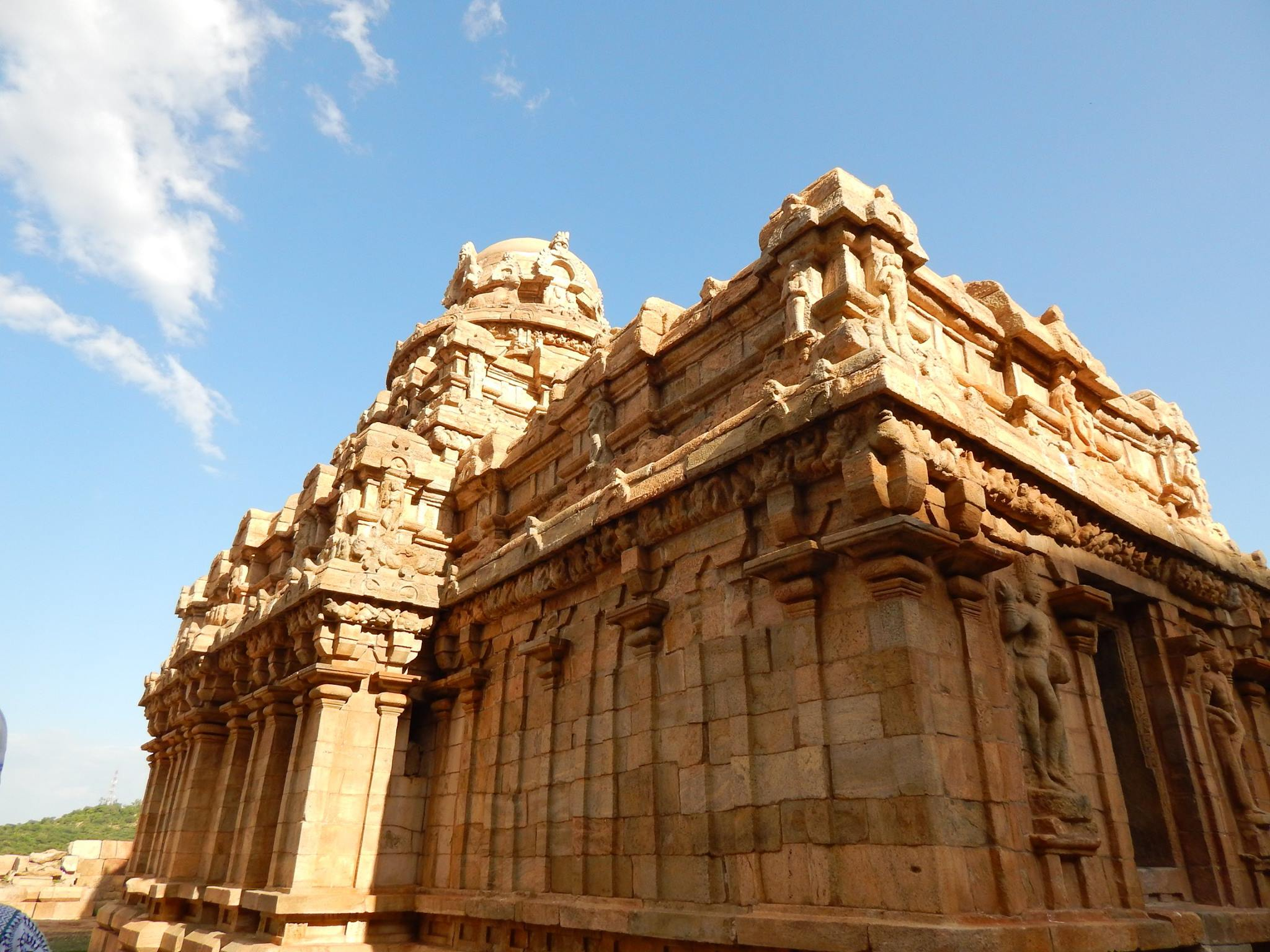
Vijayalaya Choleswaran Temple at Narthamalai

Sculpture at Narthamalai, India

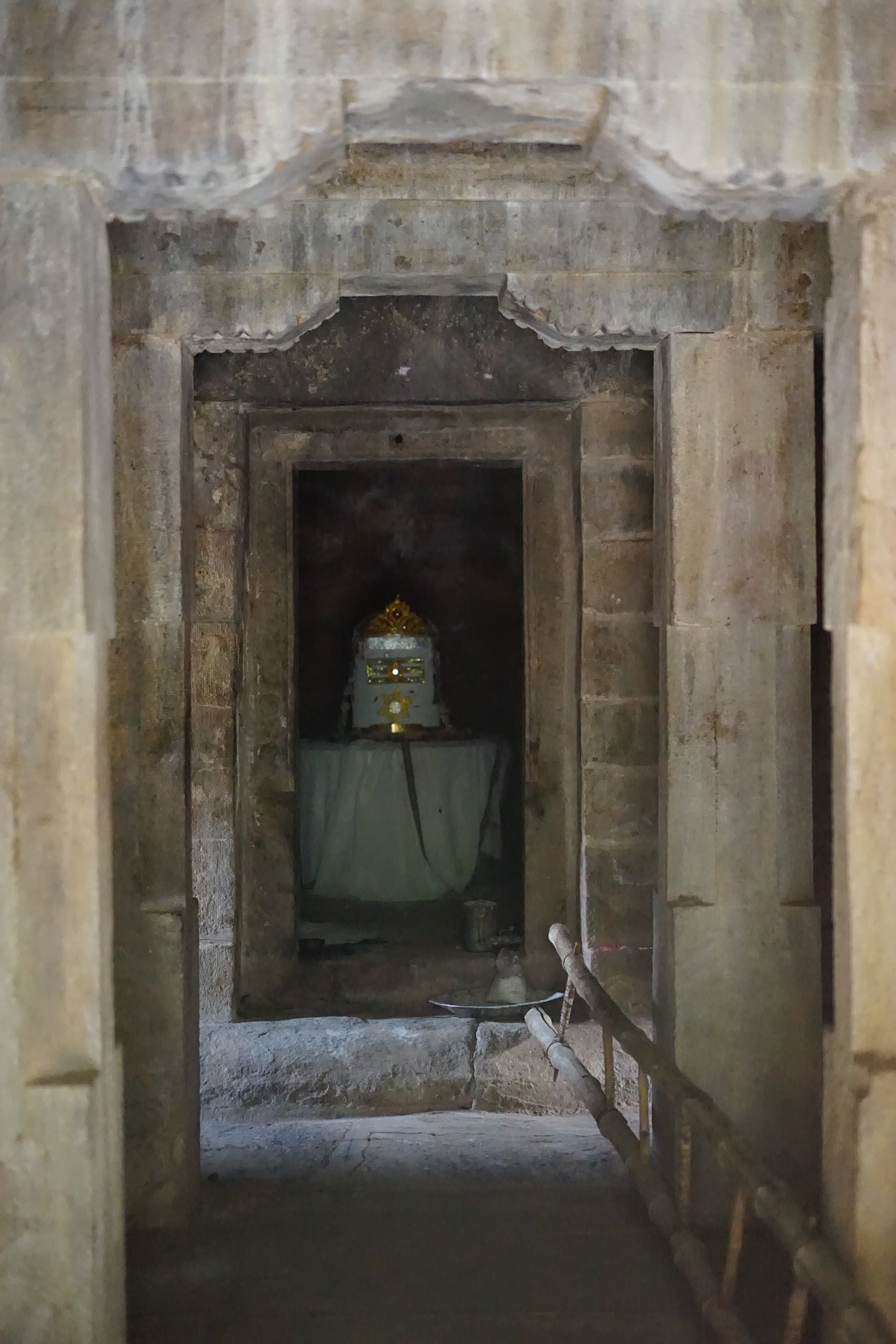
Shiva Lingam At Narthamalai

Narthamalai is a cluster of small hills that lie 25 km from Trichy on the Trichy-Pudukottai highway in the state of Tamil Nadu, India. It has some of the oldest rock cut cave temples, as well as the longest rock-cut edicts, similar to Asokan edicts which are rare in the south of India. The town houses Vijayalaya Choleeswaram built during the 9th century. The two rock-cut temples are examples of how temple architecture styles were fusing in different parts of the country.

== History ==
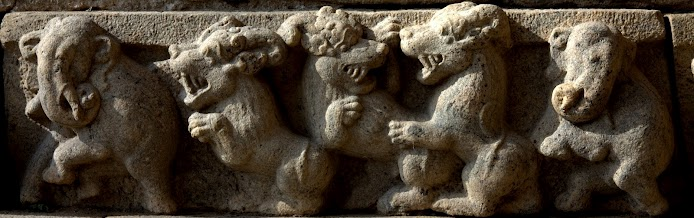
Image of pilasters on the lower part of the vimana

Narthamalai was ruled from the 7th to 9th centuries by the Mutharaiyars, who were feudatories of the Pallavas. The region was later captured by the Chola empire. Though the temple is called Vijayalaya Choleeswaram, the temple was originally built by Muttaraiyar lieutenant, Sattan Paliyili, during the seventh regnal year of Pallava king Nripatungavarman during 862 CE. As per some accounts, the temple is believed to have been built by the first king of the Chola empire, Vijayalaya Chola (848- 891 CE), but this view is highly debated. As per the inscriptions, immediately after the construction, the temple was damaged by rain and lightning. The restoration work was carried out by Tennavan Tamiladirayan, a.k.a. Pallan Anantan.

In modern times, the temple is maintained and administered by the Archaeological Survey of India as a protected monument.

The place was called Telinga-kula-kala-puram in the 11th century during the times of Rajaraja Chola I and his son Rajendra Chola I.

== See also ==
- Indian rock-cut architecture
