= Muttaraiyan (title) =

Muttaraiyan was a title used by various officials in the Chola government during the medieval period. It should not be confused with the Muthuraja caste and has been borne by persons from various communities. For example, Virarajendra Brahmadhiraya Muttaraiyan and Vikramasola Brahmadiraya Muttaraiyan were feudatories of Kulothunga Chola III. These two vassals were not Muthuraja chiefs as the word Brahmadiraya was used solely for Brahmin chiefs.

There was another Brahmadiraya Muttaraiyan who was the elder brother of VānaVidyadhara-nādālvan during the time of Kulottunga II. The latter had built a temple called Kulottunga Choleeswara.

During the reign of Rajaraja Chola III around 1243 AD, there was an officer called Mallan Sivan alias Brahmadaraya Muttaraiyan, referred to as pillai (son). He was the holder of the royal fief (arasukuru) and the governor of Urattur-nadu.

During the reign of Rajaraja Chola I, the head of the elephant corps was Srutiman Nakkan Chandiran alias Rajamalla Muttaraiyan. The officer was martyred in the fight with Irivabedanga Satyasraya when he tried piercing the enemy's elephant as per the order of prince Rajendra Chola I.

The title was also borne by a Bana chieftain and feudatory of Nrpatunga Pallava, called as Paranjaya Kadupatti Muttaraiyan and described as a descendant of Balikula. The latter was the Vjnapti(executor) of the Chirrur plates of Nrpatunga.

A deed called kilipunaithitu was given by Manavala-muttaraiyan in Kallar caste who had kani rights in Pudukkudi alias Rajndira cholamangalam, a hamlet of Tiruvellarai in Vadavali nadu near Trichy outskirts where they migrated.
