= Keelathaniyam =

Village in India

Coordinates: 10°23′55″N 78°36′18″E

- Panchayat
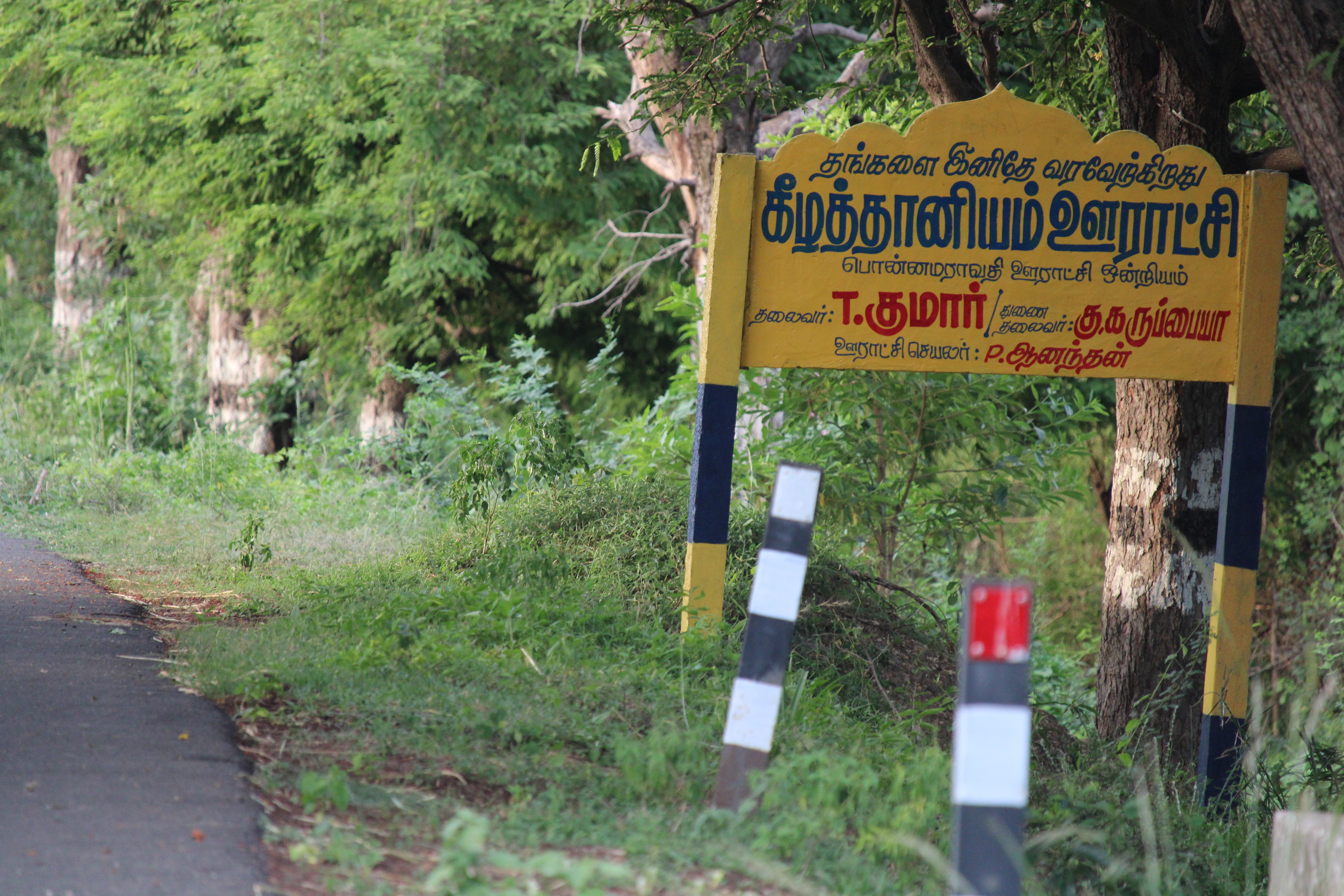
- Entrance of keelathaniyam panchayat from karaiyur road

- Location in Tamil Nadu, India Keelathaniyam (India)
- Country: India
- State: Tamil Nadu
- District: Pudukkottai

Languages
  - Official: Tamil
- Time zone: UTC+5:30 (IST)
- Telephone code: +91-4333

Keelathaniyam is a village in Pudukkottai District in the Indian state of Tamil Nadu. The panchayat is part of the Thirumayam Assembly and the Sivaganga Lok Sabha constituency. It has a total of seven wards, and seven elected members. According to the 2011 census, the population of Keelathaniyam was 2,168, comprising 1,077 females and 1,091 males.

== Basic Amenities ==
The information about basic amenities is as follows:

Basic Amenities	Numbers
Water connections	307
Mini power pumps	5
Handpumps	16
Overhead tanks	9
Rural buildings	21
Schools	1
Ponds	8
Playgrounds	1
Union roads	65
Village roads	8
Graveyards	9

== Small villages ==
List of small villages in this panchayat is as follows:

1. Rengapuram
2. Uppiliyapatti
3. V. Pudhur
4. Ramalingapuram
5. Keelathaniyam
6. Ammankoilpatti
7. Aadhi colony
8. Idaiyapatti
9. Sampappatti
