= Mutharaiyar dynasty =

Zamindars from the Indian state of Tamil Nadu

Mutharaiyar
- 600 CE–850 CE
- Capital: Thanjavur
- Official languages: Tamil
- Religion: Saivism, Vaishnavism, Jainism
- Government: Monarchy
- Mutharaiyar
  - 650-680 CE: Kuvavan Maaran alias Perumbidugu Mutharaiyar I
  - 680 -705 CE: Maaran Parameswaran alias Ilangovadiaraiyan
  - 705-745 CE: Suvaran Maran alias Perumbidugu Mutharaiyar II
  - 745 -770 CE: Videlviduku Satan Maran
  - 770-791 CE: Peradiarayan alias Marbiduku
  - 791 -826 CE: Kuvavan Satan alias Videlviduku Mutharaiyar
- Historical era: Middle Ages
  - Established: 600 CE
  - Disestablished: 850 CE
Preceded by	Succeeded by
Kalabhra dynasty	Chola dynasty

The Mutharaiyars were a South Indian dynasty that ruled parts of the Kaveri delta—including Thanjavur, Tiruchirappalli, Sivaganga, Pudukottai, and Perambalur—between c. 600 and 850 CE.

== History ==
=== Origin ===
Early 20th-century epigraphist T. A. Gopinatha Rao proposed to identify the Mutharaiyars with the earlier Kalabhras, by reading the ruler Suvaran Maaran's title inscription KalavaraKalvan as KalabhraKalvan by substituting 'b' for 'v'. Based on this proposed connection, some early writers suggested that they originated from Erumainadu (identified with Mysore region) and entered Tamilakam. However, modern historians, including K. A. Nilakanta Sastri, have rejected this identification due to lack of linguistic, chronological or epigraphical evidence that links the 7th-century Mutharaiyars to the 3rd- to 6th-century Kalabhars. Epigraphical studies have identified the dynasty as indigenous lineage of Tamil chieftains based in the Kaveri delta.

=== Early rulers (Thanjavur) ===
The dynasty consolidated power in the central Kaveri delta region around the 7th century CE. Recorded rulers of the lineage include Perumbidugu Mutharaiyar I (also called Kuvavan Maran), his son Ilangovadiaraiyan (Parameswaran), and his grandson Perumbidugu Mutharaiyar II (Suvaran Maaran). An 8th-century inscription from Sendalai in Thanjavur district names Suvaran Maran as the ruler of Thanjavur and lord of Vallam. Jain records from Shravanabelagola indicate that the acharya Vimalachandra visited his court in Thondaimandalam, where he engaged in philosophical debates with Shaivas, Kapalikas, Pasupatas, and Buddhists. The Sendalai epigraph accords Suvaran Maaran titles such as Satrukesari (lion to enemies) and Vēl-Maaran, as his royal banner displayed the Vēl (spear or lance), earning him the designation Vēl-kodiyaan.

Between the 7th and 8th centuries, the Mutharaiyars generally functioned as feudatories of the Pallavas, while asserting their regional autonomy. Sculptures and inscriptions at the Vaikuntha Perumal temple in Kanchipuram depict a Mutharaiyar chieftain welcoming Nandivarman II Pallavamalla at his coronation. Historians identify this chief as Perumbidigu Mutharaiyar II, designated as Kalavara Kalvan in the record. Historian T. V. Mahalingam remarks that he campaigned alongside the Pallava general Udayachandra in approximately twelve battles against the Cheras and Pandyas. Around 850 CE, Vijayalaya Chola captured Thanjavur from the Mutharaiyars, ending their independent rule and incorporated their territory into the expanding Chola kingdom.

=== The northern branch ===
In the northern Telugu country, the Kalamalla inscription (c. 575 CE)—regarded as the earliest extant stone inscription in Telugu language—records a gift by Chola Maharaja Dhananjaya Erikal Muthuraju. The title Muthuraju is a linguistic derivative of Mutharaiyar, while Erikal is identified with the Kamalapuram area of modern Kadapa district. Dhananjaya's father, Nandivarman Chola, was a descendant of Karikala Chola. The lineage continued through his son Mahendravikrama and his grandson Erikal Muthuraju Punyakumara, donor of the 7th-century Malepadu plates, which attribute the embankment of Kaveri River to Karikala. Dhananjaya's brothers included Sundarananda and Simhavishnu. A later descendant of Sundarananda, the 9th-century chieftain Choladhiraja Srikantha, ruled as an independent lord of Mylapore (Mylaikkon). In the Anbil plates of Sundara Chola, Srikantha is listed as the immediate predecessor of Vijayalaya Chola, the founder of Imperial Chola line. However the plates do not mention the genealogical connection between them.

In 1243 CE, during the reign of Rajaraja Chola III, an official named Mallan Sivan (styled Brahmadaraya Mutharaiyan) governed Urattur-nadu as the holder of royal estate (arasukuru). Any direct genealogical or political connection between the Mutharaiyars of Kaveri delta and the Renandu Telugu Cholas using the Muthuraju title remains unestablished.

== Religion ==
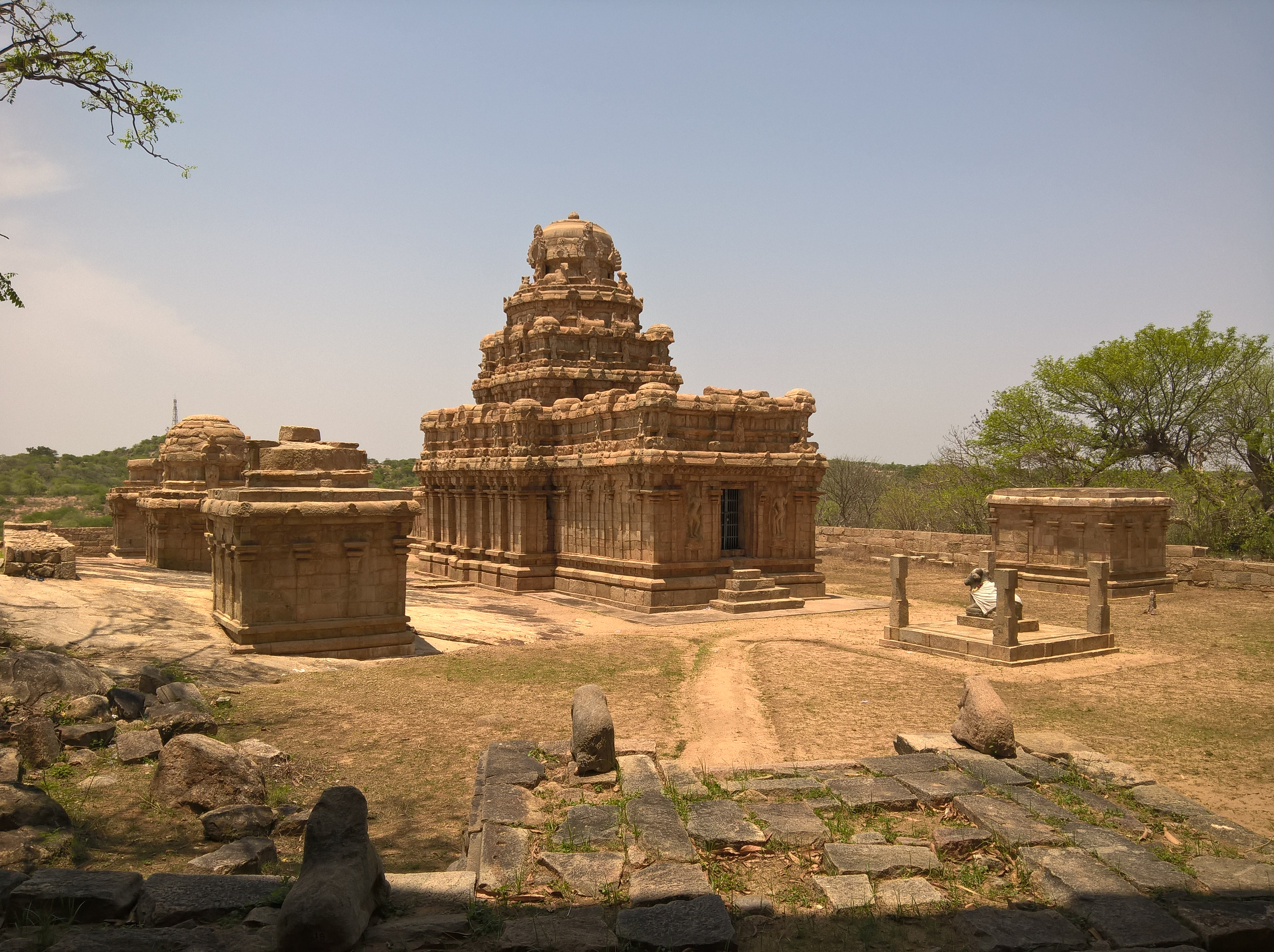
Full view of Vijayalaya Choleeswaram

Historians including M. Arunachalam and Burton Stein suggest that early Mutharaiyar chieftains were initially Jains before converting back to Hinduism. The granite mound of Narthamalai preserve both traditions; the 8th-century Aluruttimalai Jain cave complex with carvings of thirthankaras, alongside rock-cut Hindu cave temple containing sculptures of Vishnu. The Vijayalaya Choleeswaram temple in Narthamalai, dedicated to Shiva, was initially constructed during the Mutharaiyar reign in 9th-century. Later, the Cholas too added structural additions to this temple. The temple is considered one of the oldest stone temples in South India.

== Art and architecture ==
The Mutharaiyars were patrons of rock-cut cave architecture across Pudukkottai and Tiruchirappalli regions. Major surviving temples from their time include the rock-cut cave temples at Narthamalai, the Shiva cave temple at Kunnandarkoil, and the cave complex at Malayadipatti. The circular sanctum (omkara garbhagriha) of the temple at Narthamalai represents an uncommon architectural plan in early Dravidian design, reflecting the transition between late Pallava and early Chola architectural traditions.

== Literature ==
Two stanzas (200, 296) of Nālaṭiyār, a Jain work in Tamil also known as Vellalar Vēdham (the sacred scripture of the Vellalar), praise the hospitality, wealth, and military victories of Perumbidugu Mutharaiyar. Verses in the classical poetic anthology Muṭṭoḷḷāyiram similarly, celebrate the martial achievements of Mutharaiyar chieftains. Another independent work, the Mutharaiyar kovai, is now lost, but is cited in the earlier grammatical commentary on the Yaapparungalam.

== Mutharaiyar Title and legacy ==
During the Chola period, Muttaraiyan was retained as an honorific title or administrative designation held by non-royal officers and regional nobility. Inscriptions from the reign of Kulothunga Chola III record Brahmin administrative officials bearing titles such as Virarajendra Brahmadhiraya Muttaraiyan and Vikramasola Brahmadiraya Muttaraiyan. The word Brahmadiraya meant Brahmin chiefs only. A separate 13th-century epigraph from Tiruvellarai records a land tenure deed (kīl-puṉai-thīṭṭu) executed by a landholder named Manavala Mutharaiyan from the Kallar caste, that documented hereditary cultivation rights (kāṇi) in the region.
