= Srikantha Chola =

- Rajakesari Varman, Choladhiraja, Tondaiyarkon, Mayilayarkon
- Reign: 817–845
- House: Pottapi Cholas
- Dynasty: Chola
- Religion: Hinduism

Srikantha Chola (Telugu: శ్రీకంత చోళుడు) (Tamil: ஸ்ரீகந்த சோழன்) was a Telugu Chola ruler belonging to the Pottapi Chola family, which claimed descent from ancient Tamil king Karikala Chola. He ruled the Renadu region as a feudatory of the Pallavas.

== Madras Museum copper plates ==
Five copper plates, preserved in the Madras Museum, record information about Srikantha Chola. The plates are strung together on a ring, which also carries a signet ring soldered with a seal. The seal bears a relief of a standing boar facing a dagger to its right, and an elephant god surmounted by the sun and moon above the boar.

Three inscriptions are recorded on these plates. The first inscription is in Sanskrit. It occupies three plates and a portion of the fourth plate. It records that Srikantha, a Chola Adhiraja, gave the village of Mandara to Balashakti, for the regular conduct of worship and offerings to Siva.

The second and third inscriptions are in Telugu, written in old Telugu script. These occupy the remaining portion of the fourth and one side of the fifth plate. The inscription introduces Balliya Chola with Charana Saroruha prasasti, which is a characteristic of Pottapi Cholas. The former records that Balliya Chola Maharaju gave Sasi Satesvara Bhatara the enjoyment of the income of the villages named Mandara, Inumbrolu, and Umbaka, on the auspicious occasion of nttarayana. The latter records that Vaidumba Maharaja gave the village of Katicheruvu, situated in Kadapa, to Nrittilokesvara for the sake of Dakshinayana Sankranti (an astronomical observance). The grant was made on the saptami tithi in the bright fortnight in the month of Ashadha.

This Srikantha traces his descent from Karikala Chola, the ancient Chola king, who built steps on the banks of the river Kaveri and conquered Trilochana-Pallava. This inscription is younger by two decades than the Pedda Cheppali plates of Srikantha Srimanohara Chola, which is dated around first half of 9th century AD. The chart below shows the genealogy of Srikantha Chola from Madras Museum plates. Based on the genealogy, Srikantha belongs to the Sundarananda branch of Renadu Cholas.

Genealogy of Srikantha Chola from Madras Museum plates

Karikala Chola; Second century CE
Nandivarman; Fifth century CE
Simhavishnu	Sundarananda	Erikal Mutturaju Dhanunjaya
Navarāma
Ereyamma
Vijayakāma
Arganipidugu
Kōkuli
Mahēndravarman
Elamjōla
Nripakāma
Divākara
Srikantha Choladhiraja

Srikantha is considered the contributor to the Eastern Chalukya king's copper plate grants.

The Anbil plates of Parantaka Chola II and Velanjeri plates of Parantaka Chola I mention the name 'Srikantha' preceding that of Vijayalaya Chola; however, it is unknown if both individuals are the same or share any relation. After mentioning Kochchenganan and his son Nalladikon, the Anbil plates has the following verse:

Srikantha-graha [na]rudha kumkumamka-bhujantarah
Srikantha iti-rajendras tat-kuli sam-ajayata

Translation:

In his family was born the chief of kings called Sri Kantha on whose chest were impressed marks of saffron from Lakshmi (Sri)'s embracing his neck.

This evidences that Srikantha was not the immediate successor of Nalladikon but a distant descendant, born in the family long after. The next verse introduces Vijayalaya Chola, the founder of Imperial Cholas.

== Relation with Pandyas ==
Srikantha Chola was from the Pottapi Chola family which ruled Tondaimandalam. His daughter was Akkalanimmati, the mother of Pandyan king Parantaka Viranarayana. The following lines are taken from the Dalavayapuram copper plate of Pandyan king Parantaka Viranarayana:

Aravaraiian paltuli ayirama yiruttalaiyal

peritaritin porukkinra penim porai man magalai tta todittolil inrutangiya tondaiyarkon tulakkijli vadippadai manabharanan tirumagan mayilayar kon Pottappi kulacholan pugaltarusiri Kandarajan mattama malai valal manimagalakklanimmidi

tiruvayiru karuvuyirtta Sri Parantakamagarajan
Tondainadu king, Srikantharaja, the leader of great elephants belonging to Pottapi Chola family had a daughter named Akkalanimmati who was married to Pandyan emperor Srimara Srivallabha and their son is Pandyan king Parantaka Viranarayana. The lines also indicates that Srikantha was the king of Tondaimandalam which is the capital of Pallavas and Srikantha Chola must have captured Tondaimandalam from the Pallavas.

The phrase "Mayilayarkon" literally means "Lord of Mayilai" (modern-day Mylapore). Mayilai is an ancient name for Mylapore, a prominent religious center associated with both Vaishnavite and Saivite traditions. In Vaishnavaite devotional literature, this epithet appears in the context of Thiruvaranga Kalampakam, where Mayilayarkon is interpreted as "Lord of Mayilai".

== Conquest of Tondaimandalam from Pallavas ==
During the reign of Pallava Dantivarman, no Pallava inscriptions were found in Tondaimandalam between at least 819 AD and the end of his reign. The successor of Dantivarman, Pallava Nandivarman III, issued in the sixth year of his reign the Velurpalaiyam plates, which mention that he had to obtain his kingdom with the prowess of his arms killing many enemies in the battlefield. This could suggest that the Pallava kingdom was in someone else's hands and Pallava Nandivarman III had to battle and recapture it. This event happened in the closing years of the reign of Dantivarman. This alien occupation of the Pallava kingdom was perhaps the reason for the absence of inscriptions of Dantivarman.

This foreign occupation of the Pallava kingdom could not have been by the Rashtrakutas, as there were no Rashtrakuta inscriptions found in the Pallava kingdom for 27 years. Instead, it was likely by Srikantha Chola.

This is supported by an inscription at Thillaisthanam in Thanjavur, which reads: Tondainadu pavina Solan Palayanaik-ko-kandan ayina Rajakesari Varman. The attributes it mentions—"Tondainadu pavina" ('who spread or stabilized the Thondai nadu') and "Palayanaik" ('possessor of many elephants')—are the same attributes given to Srikantha Chola in the Dalavayapuram copper plates of Parantaka Viranarayana Pandya. According to Venkayya, based on the age of the script used in this inscription (as well as another inscription at Bhaktavatsala temple in Thirukalukundram), the name "Rajakesari Varman" refers to Srikantha Chola and not Aditya Chola I. These inscriptions were made when Srikantha reissued the land grants made by previous rulers to Siva temples. This reissue happened when Srikantha Chola briefly occupied Tondaimandalam from the Pallava Dantivarman. Srikantha may have reissued the temple lands because they were taken away during the initial years of Pallava Dantivarman when he was under the Rashtrakutas, who were Jains. There is no reason Aditya Chola I would have reissued the temple lands.
