= Mount Zion Silver Jubilee Matriculation Higher Secondary School =

Mount Zion Silver Jubilee School
- Athikaram PO, Thenkarai; Thirupatthur, Sivagangai District, Tamil Nadu, 630207; India

Information
- Type: Private
- Motto: To Make Man Whole
- Established: 2015
- Founder: Jayabarathan Chelliah
- Grades: PreKG - 12
- Campus: 8 acres
- Affiliations: Government of Tamil Nadu & CBSE, New Delhi
- Website: www.mountzion.school

Mount Zion Silver Jubilee Matriculation Higher Secondary School (MZSJHSS) was established in the year 2015 at Sivagangai, Tamil Nadu, India. It is being run by the Mount Zion Christian Educational Research and Charitable Trust.

From 2022 onwards, it is affiliated to the Central Board of Secondary Education, New Delhi. It is a Senior Secondary School which offers classes from Kindergarten to 12th Standard.

== Recognition ==
The school is recognized by the Government of Tamil Nadu and is affiliated to CBSE, New Delhi.
