= Perumbidugu Mutharaiyar II =

Indian king (705–745)

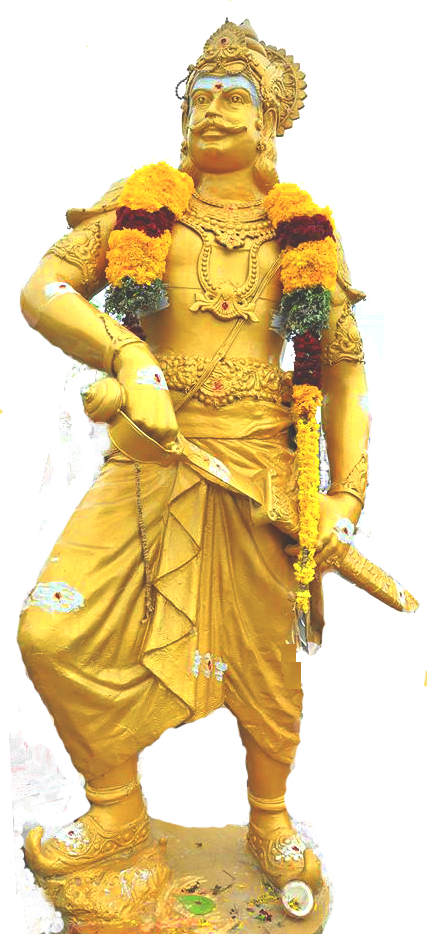
Suvaran maran Mutharaiyar

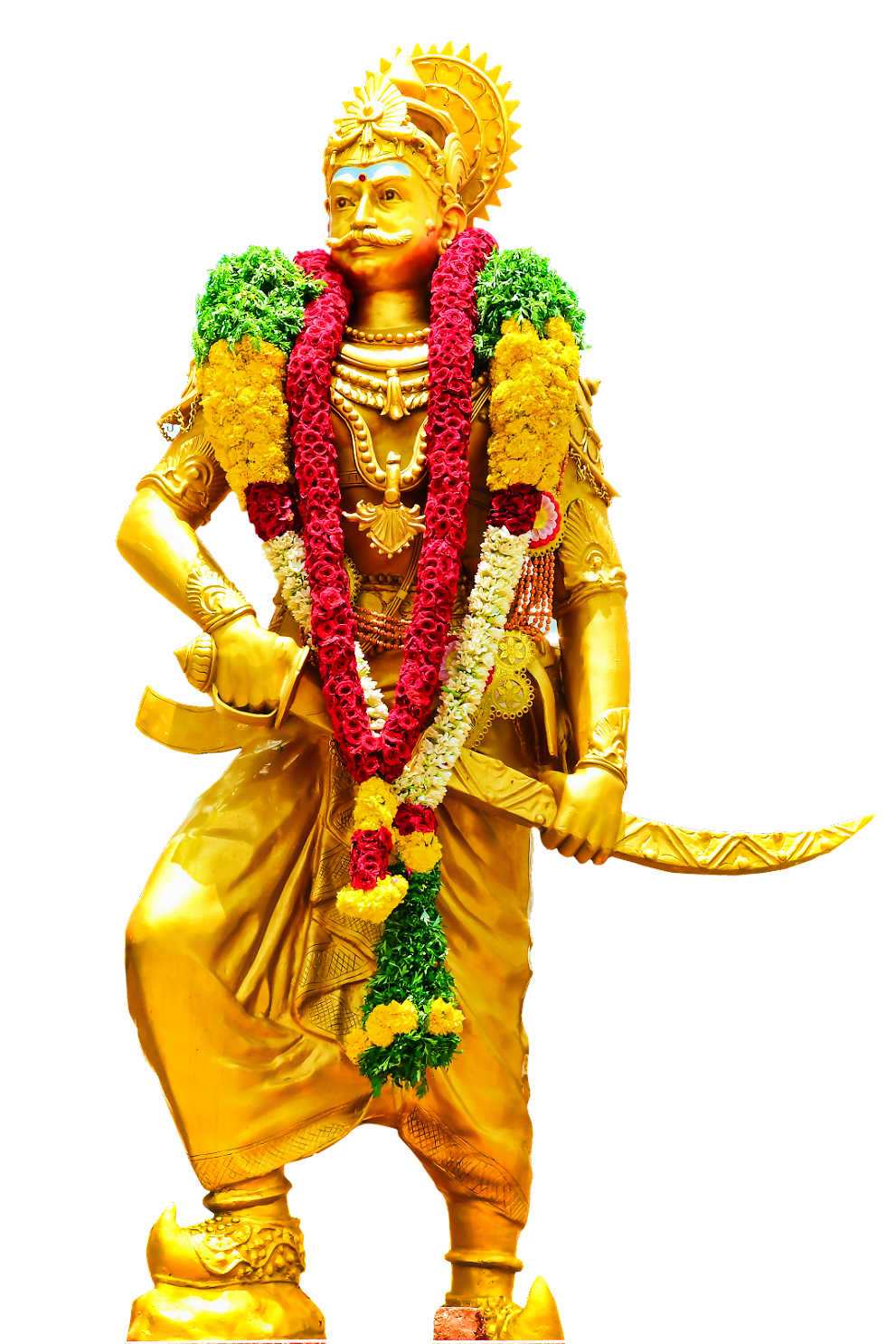
Suvaran maran Mutharaiyar statue in Anaiyur, Madurai

Perumbidugu Mutharaiyar (705 AD-745 AD), also known as Suvaran Maran and Perarasar Perumbidugu Mutharaiyar, was a king of Thanjavur from the Mutharaiyar dynasty. He ruled over Thanjavur, Trichy, Pudukkottai, Perambalur and Thiruvarur as a feudatory of the Pallava dynasty. He attended the coronation of Nandivarman II.

== Life ==
Perumbidugu Mutharaiyar II was born on 23 May 675 AD. His father was Elangovathiaraiyan, alias Maran Parameshwaran. He ascended the throne after his father in 705 AD. He was succeeded by his son Sathan Maran.

The historian T. V. Mahalingam believed it possible that the reference to a person called Kataka Muttaraiyar in ancient inscriptions at the Vaikuntha Perumal temple may in fact refer to Perumbidugu Mutharaiyar. He fought in at least 16 battles against the forces of the Pandya and Chera dynasties, allying himself with Nandivarman.Suvaran Maran, a Mutharaiyar chief, is described in the Sendalai inscriptions as having played a role in the southern campaigns of the Pallava general Udayachandra. These records attribute to him a series of victories over the Pandyas and the Cheras at places such as Kodumbalur, Manalur, Tingalur, Kandalur, Alundiyur, Karai, Marangur, Annalvayil, Sempomari, Venkodal (in Tanjai-Sempulanadu), Pugali and Kannanur.

The anniversary of Mutharaiyar's birth is celebrated annually all the people and local politicians. They garland a statue commemorating him in Trichy.
