= Vijayalaya Chola =

Chola emperor from 848 to 871

- Parakesarivarman, Thanjai Konda Koparakesarivarman
- Vijayalaya's Territories c. 850

Chola Emperor
- Reign: c. 850 – c. 871
- Successor: Aditya I
- Born: Ottriyur (Tiruvottriyur)
- Died: c. 884; Srikalahasti at Tirupathi
- Issue: Aditya I
- House: Chola
- Dynasty: Chola
- Religion: Shaivites
- Military career
- Branch: Chola Army; Pallava Governor (848–860)

Vijayalaya Chola (r. 850–871; Tamil: விஜயாலய சோழன், romanized: Vicayālaya Cōḻaṉ) was the founder of the Imperial Chola Dynasty, which succeeded the Early Cholas. He ruled from 850 to 871. He ruled over the region to the north of the river Kaveri. He is one of the descendants of the famous Sangam age Chola king, Karikala Chola. Vijayalaya was succeeded by his son Aditya Chola I who laid the foundation of the Imperial Chola Empire.

== Dark age of Chola ==
The ancient Chola kingdom, once famous in Tamil literature and the writings of Greek merchants and geographers faded into darkness after c. 300 CE. Cholas during this period almost completely disappeared from their native land. They have held on to their old capital city of Uraiyur. This dark age is said to have been caused by the invasion of the Kalabhras. This "dark" age of Tamil history came to an end with the ascendancy of the Pandyas and the Pallavas after overthrowing Kalabhras in 590 CE. The Cholas disappeared from the Tamil land almost completely in this debacle, though a branch of them can be traced towards the end of the dark period in Rayalaseema—the Telugu Chodas, whose kingdom is mentioned by Yuan Chwang in the seventh-century CE.

== Cholas under Pandyas and Pallavas ==
Due to the Kalabhra invasion and the growing power of Pallavas, the Cholas migrated from their native country to Telugu lands and ruled from there as chieftains of Pallavas at least since 470 CE. The Cholas who were ruling the Telugu lands are called as Telugu Chodas or Telugu Cholas. The Cholas had to wait for another three centuries until the accession of Vijayalaya Chola. The Anbil plates of Parantaka Chola II and Velanjeri plates of Parantaka Chola I mention the name Sri Kantha whose name precedes that of Vijayalaya Chola in the ancestral lineage, however, it is unknown if the Srikantha of Anbil plates is the Srikantha of Pottapi Cholas.

The Velanjeri inscription also refers to father of Vijayalaya Chola as Ottriyuran, a name which some scholars interpret as a title meaning "lord of Thiruottriyur," a prominent Shaivite centre near modern Chennai. Similarly, the Dalavayapuram copper plate of the Pandyan king Parantaka Viranarayana refers to Srikantha Chola of Pottapi as Mayilayarkon, meaning "Lord of Mylapore." Given that Thiruottriyur and Mylapore are geographically proximate—located just 17 kilometers apart in present-day Chennai—it is plausible that Srikantha Chola held sway over both these sacred and strategic locales. This strengthens the argument that Srikantha Chola, identified as both Ottriyuran and Mayilayarkon, could be the same individual, and adds weight to the scholarly view that he was the father of Vijayalaya Chola.

== Rise of Vijayalaya Chola ==
Making use of the opportunity during a war between the Pandyas and Pallavas, Vijayalaya rose out of obscurity and captured Thanjavur. However, there is no substantiated proof to verify the claim regarding his obscure beginnings. For a very long time, historians could not trace the ancestry of Vijayalaya Chola, who is considered to be the founder of the Medieval Chola dynasty.

Around mid ninth century CE, there was a great struggle going on between the Pallavas and the Pandyas for the political supremacy of South India. In this disturbed state of affairs, Vijayalaya Chola seems to have found a good opportunity to defeat the Pandyas, and make himself the ruler of Thanjavur and the surrounding Chola country. He also defeated the Pallavas.

Vijayalaya Chola conquered Thanjavur from Elango Mutharaiyar who was the final ruler of Mutharaiyar dynasty. It is said that in the year 852 CE Vijayalaya Chola waged war with Pandya's and defeated the latter. Making use of the opportunity during a war between Pandyas and Pallavas, Vijayalaya rose and established the Chola empire at Thanjavur with help of Muttaraiyar lieutenant, Sattan Paliyilli (826–852 CE). Cholas became so powerful that the Pallavas were also wiped out from the Thanjavur region at a later stage.

== Pandyan invasion ==
After Vijayalaya’s capture of Thanjavur, the Pandyan king Varagunavarman II (c. 862 – 885 CE) became a subordinate ally of the Pallava Nandivarman III (c. 846 – 869 CE). Nandhivarman wished to curtail the growing influence of Chola power under Vijayalaya and called upon the Varagunavarman to help suppress Vijayalaya. Varaguna led an expedition into the Chola country. The Pandyan army reached the north bank of the Kaveri near Thanjavur and for a while the Chola revival looked short lived. Vijayalaya, by this time a veteran of many battles, was aging and was an invalid. By this time Vijayalaya lost his kingdom to the Pandyas and he became a tax paying king under the Pandya reign but the Cholas who succeeded him conquered the Pandya kingdom.

== Inscriptions of Vijayalaya ==
The Tiruvalangadu plates state that Vijayalaya captured the city of Tanjavur and made it his capital and that he also built in it a temple to the goddess Nisumbhasudani (Durga). The Kanyakumari inscription states that he renovated the city of Tanjore.

Vijayalaya took the title of Tamil: பரகேசரிவர்மன், romanized: Parakēcarivarmaṉ, lit. 'Great son who is a lion to his enemies'. The suffix Tamil: வர்மன், romanized: Varmaṉ is according to S. Ramachandran a corrupt version of the Tamil word Tamil: பெருமகன், romanized: Great son, lit. 'Perumakaṉ'.

It goes as following – Perumagan (பெருமகன்) -> Perumaan (பெருமான்) -> Peruman (பெருமன்) -> Paruman (பருமன்) -> Varuman (வருமன்) -> Varman (வர்மன்) -> Varmaa (வர்மா).

Chola kings succeeding him took the titles of Tamil: பரகேசரி, romanized: Parakēcari, lit. 'One who is a lion to his enemy'. This is probably to acknowledge their supposed ancestors Parakesari.

Narttamalai, Pudukkottai has a solesvara temple attributed to Vijayalaya.

Preceded by Pandya Pallava	Chola; 850–871 CE	Succeeded by Aditya I
