= Muthuraja =

Tamil and Telugu speaking community in south India

- Classification: Backward caste
- Religions: Hinduism • Jainism
- Languages: Tamil • Telugu
- Country: India
- Populated states: Tamil Nadu
- Region: Central Tamil Nadu

Muthuraja (also known as Mutharaiyar) is a Tamil and Telugu speaking community found in the Indian state of Tamil Nadu.

== Etymology ==
The etymology of the community name is unclear. The names Muthuraja and Muthuraiyar may be derived from two words, the Tamil name muthu meaning "pearl" and raja or raiyar both meaning "king". Muttaraiyar may also be derived from mundru meaning "three" and tharai meaning "earth".

== Origins ==
The Tamil-speaking Muthuraja are densely distributed in the central and southern districts of Tamil Nadu, particularly in the Cauvery Delta region. They have historical roots as a ruling dynasty in this region, with inscriptions and literature from the 7th-9th centuries mentioning Tamil-speaking Mutharaiyar chiefs.

The Telugu-speaking section, often known as Muthuraja Naidu or Muthiriya Naidu, is mostly found in the northern districts of Tamil Nadu. This group's ancestors are to have migrated from the Telugu-speaking regions of present-day Andhra Pradesh during the Vijayanagara and Nayaka periods, serving as paligars and soldiers.

== Subdivision ==
The Mutharaiyar community had two linguistic sects within the state; being Tamil and Telugu.

The Tamil-speaking Muthuraja community has historical connections to the Mutharaiyar dynasty, a ruling family from the 7th to 9th centuries CE and a strong presence in the central and southern districts of Tamil Nadu. while the Telugu-speaking Muthuraja Naidu community, who migrated from the Telugu-speaking areas of Andhra Pradesh, is mostly found in the northern districts of Tamil Nadu.

== Titles ==
Their title Ambalakkarar is derived from the Tamil word ambalam meaning panchayat or "village council", as they served as the heads of these councils.

== Unified Subcastes ==
J. Jayalalithaa, as Chief Minister of Tamil Nadu, issued a government order (G.O. 15/22.02.1996) in 1996 that unified 29 existing sub-castes into a single, combined "Mutharaiyar" community for official purposes.

Several Tamil and Telugu speaking sub-castes were unified under the common name "Mutharaiyar" (also Muthuraja) for the purpose of official government records and backward class reservations in Tamil Nadu.

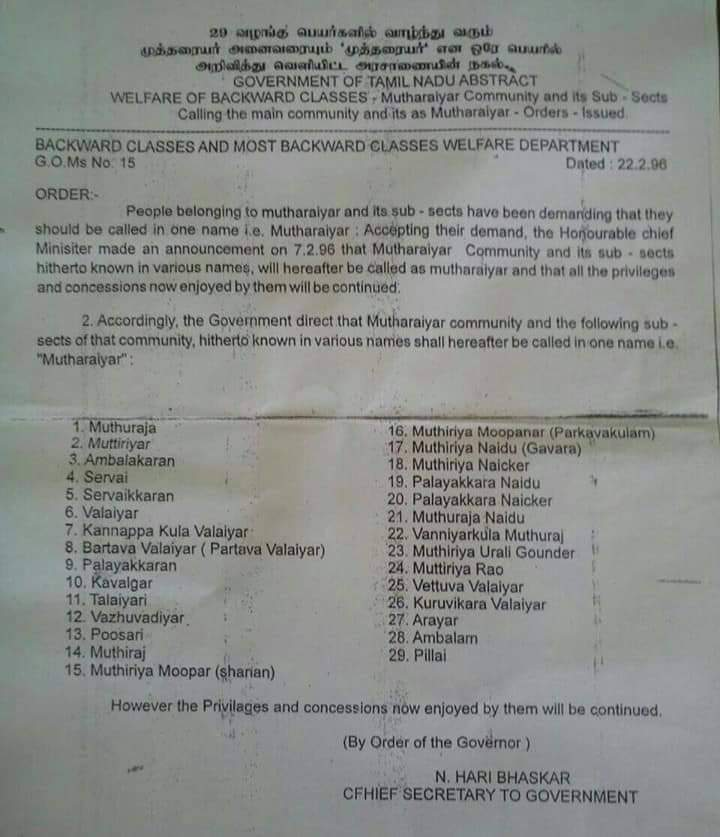
backward classes and most backward classes welfare department G.O.Ms.No :15 dated 22-2-1996

== Demographics ==
The Tamil-speaking Muthuraja are densely distributed in the Tiruchirappalli, Pudukkottai, Thanjavur, Karur, Madurai, Dindigul, Perambalur and Sivagangai districts of Tamil Nadu.

The Telugu-speaking Muthuraja Naidu, comparatively fewer in number, are mostly distributed in the Chennai, Tiruvallur, Kanchipuram, Vellore, Tiruvannamalai, Viluppuram and Cuddalore districts of northern Tamil Nadu.
