= Pazhayarai =

Ancient Chola capital city

- Palayaru
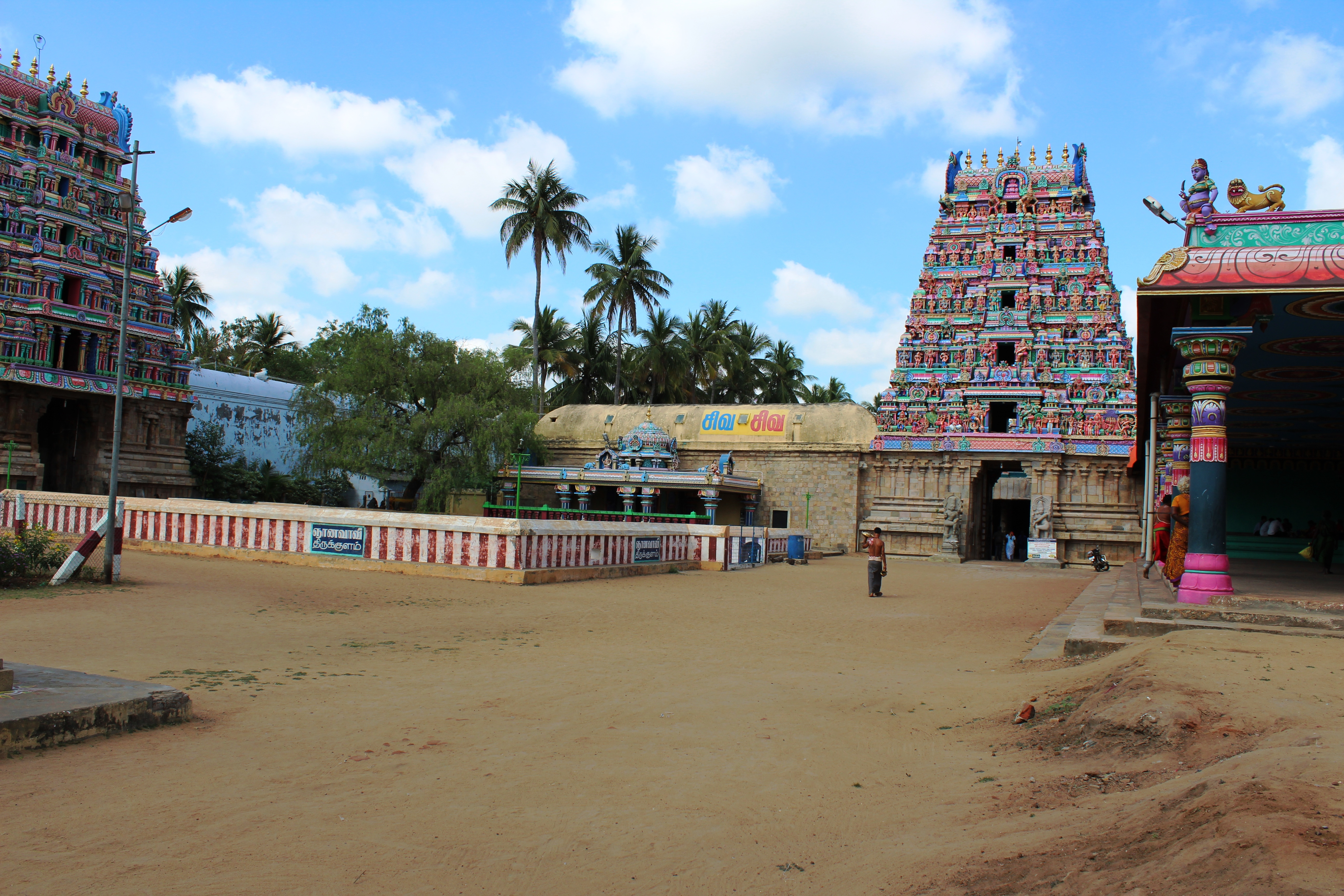
- Image of Thenupuriswarar temple at Patteeswaram
- Periods: Medieval Cholas
- Region: Thanjavur
- Part of: Chola capitals

Pazhayarai or Pazhaiyarai or Palayarai (Tamil: பழையாறை paḻaiyāṟai) was a historic residential capital of the medieval Chola dynasty in Tamil Nadu. The place is located arroximately 7 km (4.3 mi) southwest of Kumbakonam in Thanjavur district. It is situated along the distributaries (T.Patnam) of Kaveri River. The historic urban complex now comprises a cluster of contiguous villages and hamlets. In contemporary inscriptional records and literature, the city was known by several titles, including Ayiratalli (place of thousand temples), Pazhayaru, Ahavamallakulakalapuram, and Minavanai-ven-konda-solapuram.

The place was originally governed by the Muttaraiyar chieftains under the Pallava empire as Avaninarayanapuram. Pazhayarai became a secondary capital and principal royal residence of Cholas from the 9th to 12th centuries, particularly under Parantaka II (Sundara Chola) and Rajaraja I. It declined following the resurgence of the Pandya dynasty in the 13th century. Surviving monuments in the surrounding area include the Thenupuriswarar Temple at Patteeswaram, Pazhayarai Vadathali, Panchavan Madeviyar memorial shrine (Pallippadai), Thirunandipura Vinnagaram (Nathan Kovil), and Sakthivanesvara Temple.

== Geography and layout ==
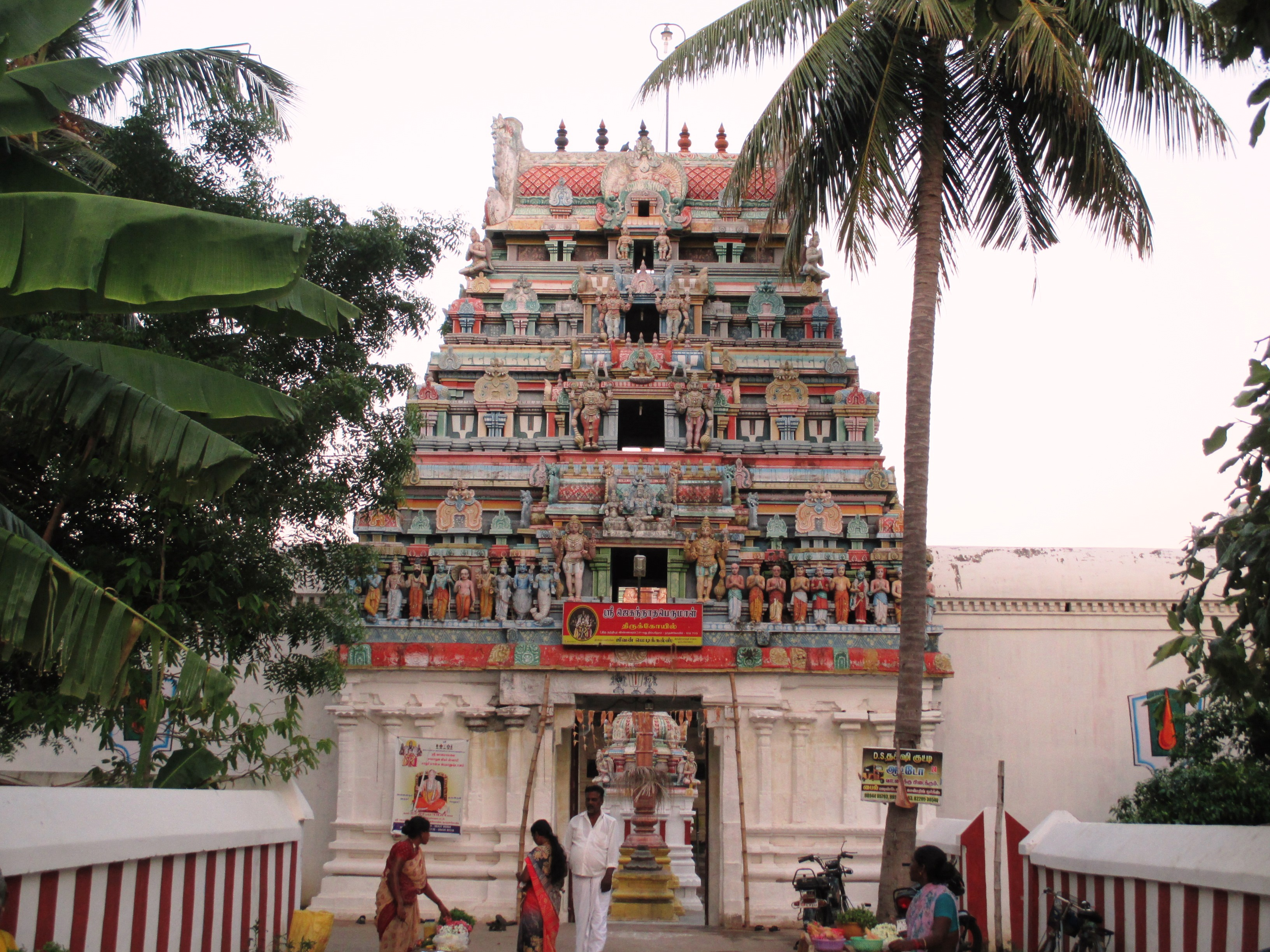
Image of Nathan Kovil after which the region is named

The historic urban complex of Pazhayarai occupied an area along the Tirumalaranjanar River and adjacent irrigation distributaries of the Kaveri delta. Medieval town planning positioned four cardinal Shiva shrines around the city core: Vadathali (north), Kelthali (east), Metrali (west), and Thenthali (south). Inscriptional records and local toponyms identify residential military encampments (padai veedu) flanking the royal quarters, including Arupadai Veedu, Pudhupadai Veedu, Manapadai Veedu and Pampaipadai Veedu. There are lot of small villages inside the historical town of Pazhayarai – Thirunandipura Vinnagaram, Sathi mutram, Patteeswaram with all their temples.

== Etymology and historical names ==
The earliest textual reference to Pazhayarai occur in the 7th-century Tevaram hymns composed by the Shaivite saints Sambandar and Appar. Sambandar recorded visits to the Metral and Thenupuriswarar temples, noting disputes over temple possession with local Jain communities. The town is also associated in hagiography with Amaraneedi Nayanar, one of the sixty-three canonical Nayanmars. Following the patronage of the 8th-century Pallava monarch Nandivarman II, the site was termed Nandipuram, and later Avaninarayanapuram after Nandivarman III (r. 846–869 CE). During the Imperial Chola period, regnal epithets of triumphs were applied to teh settlement. Virarajendra Chola (r. 1063–1070 CE) designated it Ahavamallakulakalapuram, while Kulothunga I (r. 1070–1120 CE) named it Minavanai-ven-konda-solapuram to commemorate campaigns in the Pandya country.

== History ==
In the 8th century, Pazhayarai was the administrative center under the Muttaraiyars, who were the regional subordinates of the Pallavas. Around 850 CE, Vijayalaya Chola captured the surrounding delta region, incorporating the city into the developing Chola domain. Under Sundara (Parantaka II, r. 957–970), Pazhayarai became the primary royal seat. Even after Rajaraja I established Thanjavur as the imperial military and administrative capital, Pazhayarai remained the favored residential city for the royal family. Royal women, including Rajaraja's elder sister Kundavai, maintained independent palace establishments and issued administrative endowments from the city. Traditional accounts record that Rajaraja I retired to Pazhayarai in his final years. When Rajendra I transferred the imperial capital to Gangaikonda Cholapuram around 1025 CE, Pazhayarai retained its status as a secondary residential center and cultural hub until the Pandyan conquest in the 13th century.

Archeological excavations conducted by the Tamil Nadu State Department of Archaeology in 1983–1984 at Nandan Medu, Keezha Pazhayarai, and Nathankoil unearthed Chola-period structural remains, ring wells, pottery, and decorative tiles. While predominantly associated with Shaivite adn Vaishnavite institutions, 7th-century devotional verses by Appar documents earlier Jain monastic quarters (pallis) in the area. In addition, granite sculptures of the Buddha recovered from surrounding fields attest to the presence of Mahayana Buddhist establishments in the delta between the 9th and 11th centuries.

== Architecture and religious sites ==
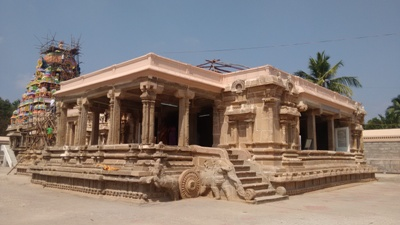
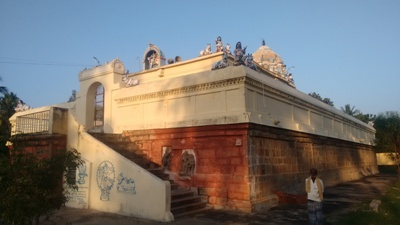
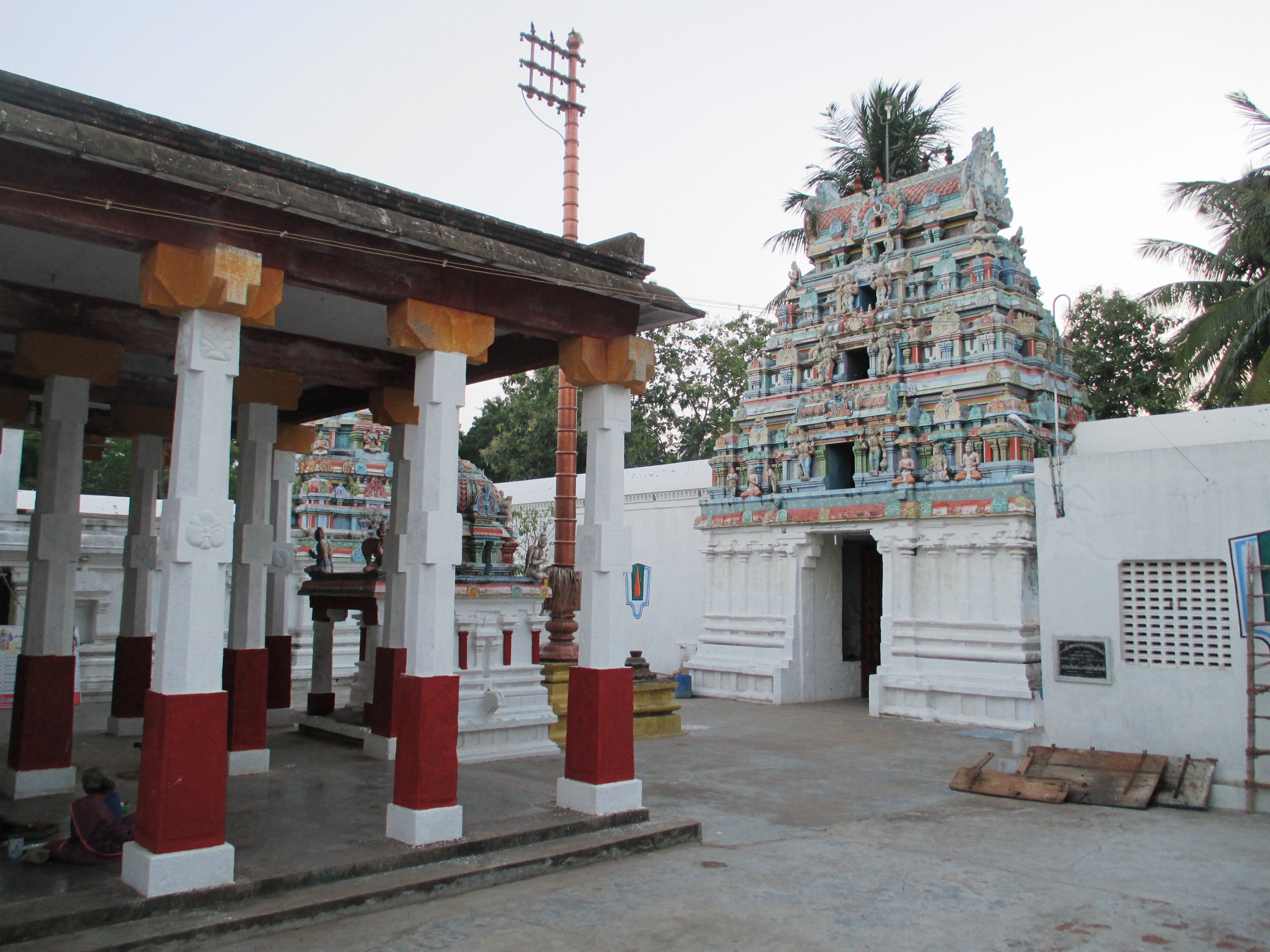
Temples in Pazhayarai

Nathan Kovil (Thiru Nandipura Vinnagaram), an 8th-century Pallava-era Vishnu temple, is celebrated in the Nalayira Divya Prabandham by Thirumangai Alvar as one of the 108 Divya Desams dedicated to Vishnu as Jagannathan and Lakshmi as Shenbagavalli. Among the Shaivite shrines, the Pazhayarai Vadathali (Dharmapureeswarar Temple) is praised in theh Tevaram as a Paadal Petra Sthalam. Neighboring sites include the Parasunathar Temple at Muzhaiyur, associated in local lore with Parashurama, and the Sakthivanesvara Temple at Sakthimutram, which is renowned for sculptural panels depicting Parvati embracing a Shiva lingam.

The Thenupuriswarar Temple at Patteeswaram, also a Paadal Petra Sthalam, is linked in tradition to Sambandar. Here the Vahana Nandi is aligned slightly off-center to afford the child-saint an unobstructed view of the sanctum. This event is commemorated in the annual Muthupandal festival. The Somanathaswami Temple preserves epigraphs recording endowments granted by princess Kundavai during the reign of Rajaraja I. Airavatesvara Temple at Darasuram, built by Rajaraja Chola II (r. 1146–1173) in the 12th century CE is classified as a UNESCO World Heritage Site, along with the Brihadeeswara Temple at Thanjavur, the Gangaikondacholisvaram Temple at Gangaikonda Cholapuram that are referred to as the Great Living Chola Temples. In Keezha Pazhayarai, Rajendra I constructed the Panchavan Madeviyar Temple as a funerary memorial shrine (pallippadai) for his stepmother. This represents a rare extant example of royal sepulchral architecture is South India.
