= Pasupatheeswarar Temple, Aavoor =

Aavoor Pasupatheeswaram
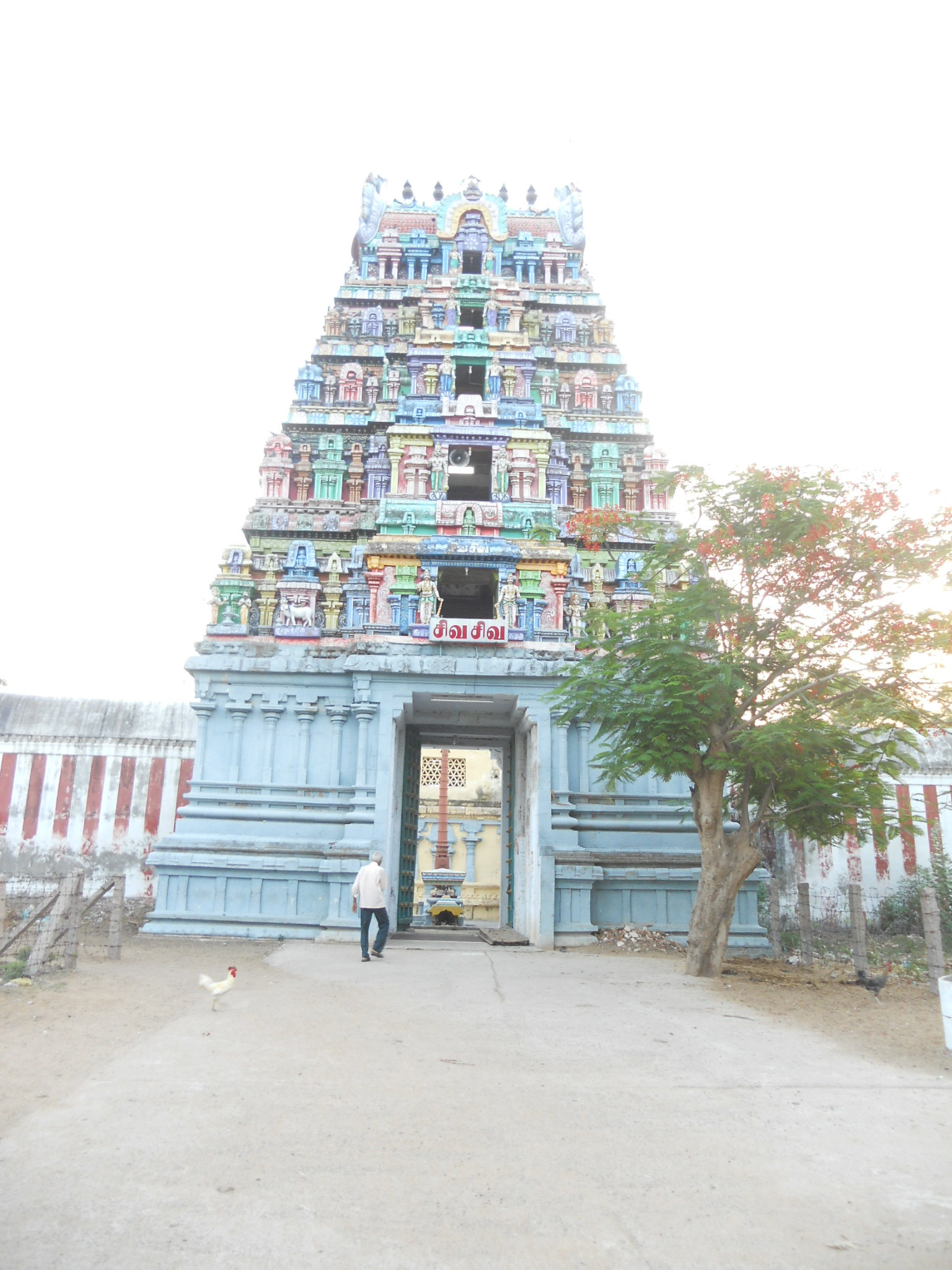

- Location in Tamil Nadu

Religion
- Affiliation: Hinduism
- District: Thanjavur
- Deity: Pasupatheeswarar (Shiva) Mangalanayagi, Pangajavalli
- Features: Temple tank: Brahma Theertham; Temple tree: Arasa Maram

Location
- Location: Aavoor
- State: Tamil Nadu
- Country: India
- Coordinates: 10°29′N 78°41′E

Architecture
- Type: Dravidian architecture
- Creator: Kocheng Chola
- Temple: 1
- Inscriptions: 1

Pasupatheeswarar Temple, Avoor or Avoor Pasupatheeswaram is a Hindu temple dedicated to Hindu god Shiva in the village of Avoor 12 km south of Kumbakonam, Tamil Nadu, India. The temple is one of the 3 madakoil built by 7th century Chola king, Kochengat Chola. The temple is known for the Panjakavyamuthra, the five images of Bhairava vijay. The temple is mentioned in the verses of Tevaram, the 17th century Tamil Saiva canon by Tirugnana Sambandar.

There are various inscriptions associated with the temple indicating contributions from pandya. The masonry structure was built during the Chola dynasty in the 9th century, while later expansions are attributed to Thanjavur Nayaks during the 16th century.

The temple is built in Dravidian architecture with a three-storied gopuram, the gateway tower.

== Legend ==
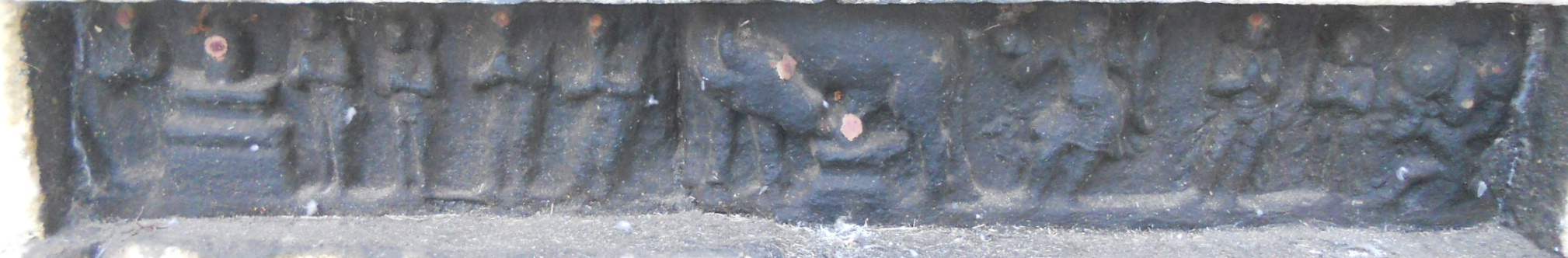
Image indicating the legend

Pasupatheeswarar indicates God of cows. Shiva is believed to have descended for the holy cow Kamadenu that prayed to him by ablution with their milk on the Shivalingam to get relief from the curse of sage Vashista. A sculpture indicating the legend is present in the walls of the second precinct of the temple. Another legend associates the temple with the saivite saint Tirumular (6th century CE). Tirumular saw a herd of cows lamenting the death of their herdsmen. Being a siddha, he entered into the body of dead herdsman, came back alive to serve as the herdsman and sung 3000 verses in praise of Shiva. The legend is closely associated with Gomukteswarar temple at Tiruvadurai, but is also associated with other temples like Thenupuriswarar Temple at Patteswaram and Tirukogarnam near Pudukkottai.

As per another legend, sage Vasishtha cursed the sacred cow Kamadhenu. To relieve off the curse, Kamadhenu sought the advice of Brahma who asked her to perform penance at this place. It is also believed that the presiding deity is believed to have been worshipped by the Devas, Saptarishi, Indra, Surya and Navagrahas, the nine planetary deities. As per a local legend, Vayu, the god of wind, in a contest with Adisesha, brought two hillocks, one of which was installed here and other at Nallur.

== Maadakovil ==
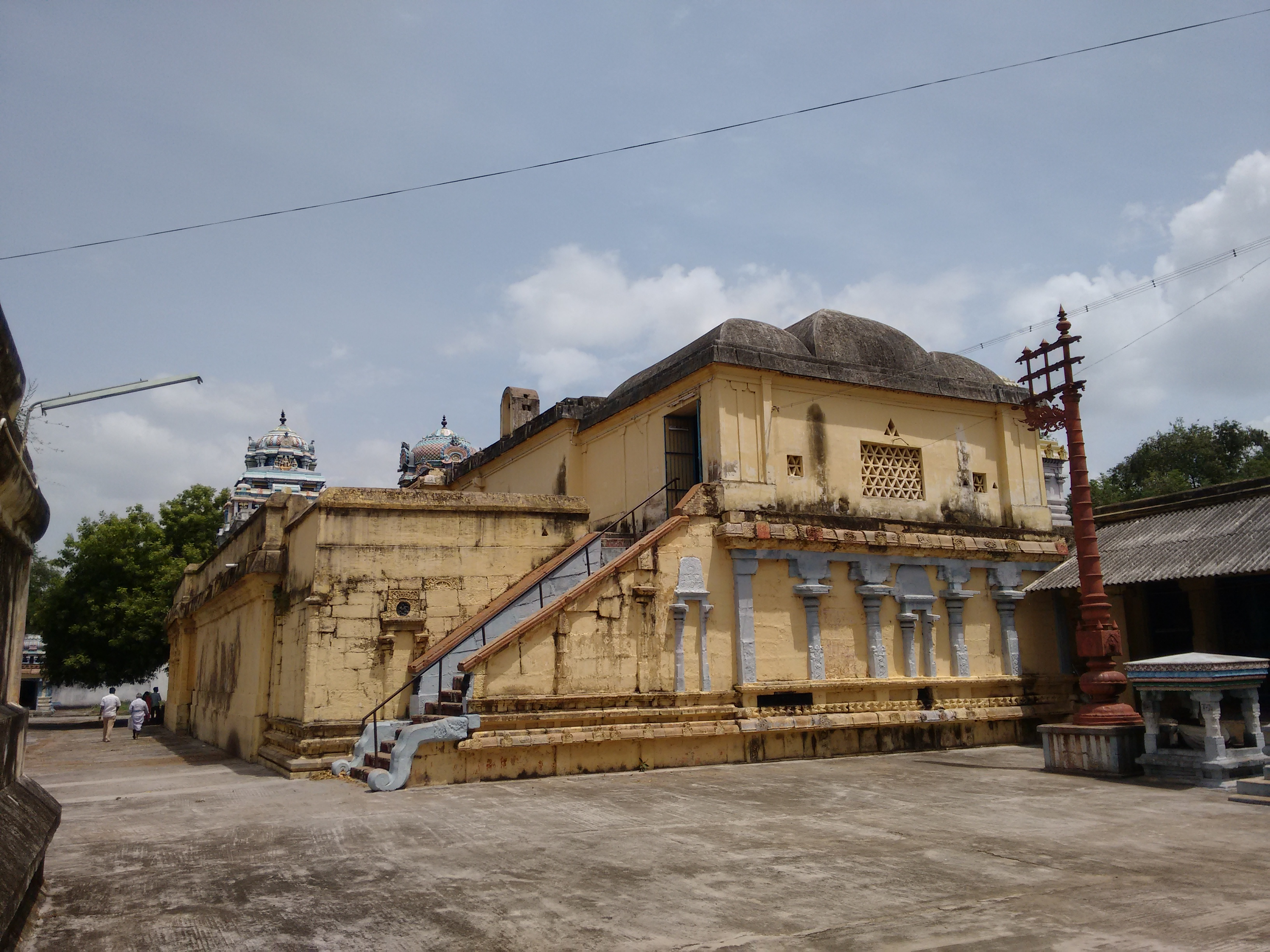
Avoor Maadakovil, full view

Avur was a fort during the 2nd century rule of Cholas. Kochengat Chola was a Chola king and one of the 63 nayanmars (saivite saints) of saivism. He is believed to have attained spiritual rebirth of a spider that fought with an elephant in its previous birth over the worship of the Hindu god Shiva. He had red eyes during birth as he remained in his mother's womb a little longer. His mother, looking into the babies red eyes said Kochengkannano (in Tamil ko=king, cheng=red, kan=eyes), which literally means king with red eyes and hence he was named Kochengat Cholan. After becoming a king, he followed saivism and built 70 Maadakovils, temples with elevated structure where elephants cannot reach the sanctum, in the Chola empire. The temple has an inscription (181 of 1911) dating from the 3rd year of the rule of Rajendra Chola III (1246-1279 CE) indicating grants of land to the temple. The temple is maintained and administered by the Hindu Religious and Charitable Endowments Department of the Government of Tamil Nadu.

== Architecture ==
The temple is located 10 km away from Kumbakonam, 6 km east of Tirukarugavoor and 30 km south of Thanjavur. The temple has a five tiered Rajagopuram with an elevated structure for the main shrine. The temple is a Maadakoil, a series of 70 temples which were built by Kochengat Chola with the major shrines of the temple located in the elevated structure. The images of the presiding deity, Pasupatheeswarar, in the form of Shiva lingam occupies the main sanctum. The consort of Pasupatheeswarar, Mangalanayagi and Pangajavalli occupy twin sanctums facing west. The images of Panchabairavar, the five Bairavar statues are found in the corner facing the main sanctum. The second prakaram downstairs has a separate shrine for the Hindu god Murugan in the form Dhanush Subramaniyar. Muruga sports a dhanush (bow) instead of his regular weapon, the vel. The temple has a small tank called Braham Tirtham located outside the main entrance. The image of Mangalanayagi was found in the temple tank. The temple is counted as one of the temples built on the banks of River Kaveri. It is located on the banks of Kudamurutti, a tributary of river Kaveri.

== Literary mention ==
It is one of the shrines of the 275 Paadal Petra Sthalams. The temple is revered in the verses of Tevaram, the 7th century saivite canonical work by the three saint poets namely, Appar, Sambandar and Sundarar. The temple is revered by Sambandar in the first Tirumurai in eleven verses. He refers to the temple as Avoor Pasupatheeswaram.

"புண்ணியர் பூதியர் பூதநாதர் புடைபடு வார்தம் மனத்தார்திங்கட்
கண்ணிய ரென்றென்று காதலாளர் கைதொழு தேத்த விருந்தவூராம்
விண்ணுயர் மாளிகை மாடவீதி விரைகமழ் சோலை சுலாவியெங்கும்
பண்ணியல் பாடல றாதவாவூர்ப் பசுபதி யீச்சரம் பாடுநாவே."

translating to

This is the place where the blessed devotees of Shiva
who are rich and where Shiva has raised in the temple in such a place called Avoor Pasupatheeswaram.
The place is surrounded by beautiful gardens, palaces and where Shiva's name is frequently uttered.
Let my tongue praise Avoor Pasupatheeswaram".
