= Pazhayarai Vadathali =

Hindu temple in India

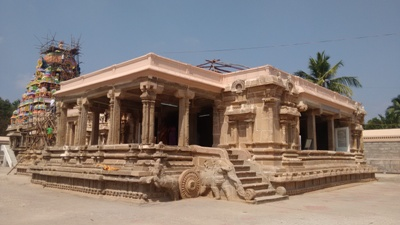

- Location in Tamil Nadu

Religion
- Affiliation: Hinduism
- District: Tanjore
- Deity: dharmapurieswarar (Shiva) vimalanayagi (Parvathi)

Location
- Location: Pazhayarai
- State: Tamil Nadu
- Country: India
- Coordinates: 10°55′39″N 79°21′12″E

Architecture
- Type: Dravidian architecture

Pazhaiyarai vadathali Temple, or Pazhaiyarai Vadathali is a Hindu temple dedicated to Someswarar, a form of Shiva. It is located 6 km from Kumbakonam, Tamilnadu, India, on the Kumbakonam- Aavoor Road, 2 km away from the Thenupuriswarar Temple at Patteeswaram and 3 km from Darasuram. It is served by buses from Kumbakonam or mini buses from Darasuram, the bus stop is Cholan Maligai. The Darasuram railway station is located close to the temple.

The temple is believed to be built during the Chola period and has several inscriptions dating back to the 8-9th century. The presiding deity, dharmapurieswarar, has a cursory mention in the 7th century Tamil Saiva canonical work, the Tevaram, written by Tamil saint poets known as the nayanars and classified as Vaippu Sthalam.

The temple has three daily rituals at various times from 7:30 a.m. to 8 p.m., and three yearly festivals on its calendar. The annual Brahmotsavam (prime festival) is attended by thousands of devotees.

== Legend and history ==
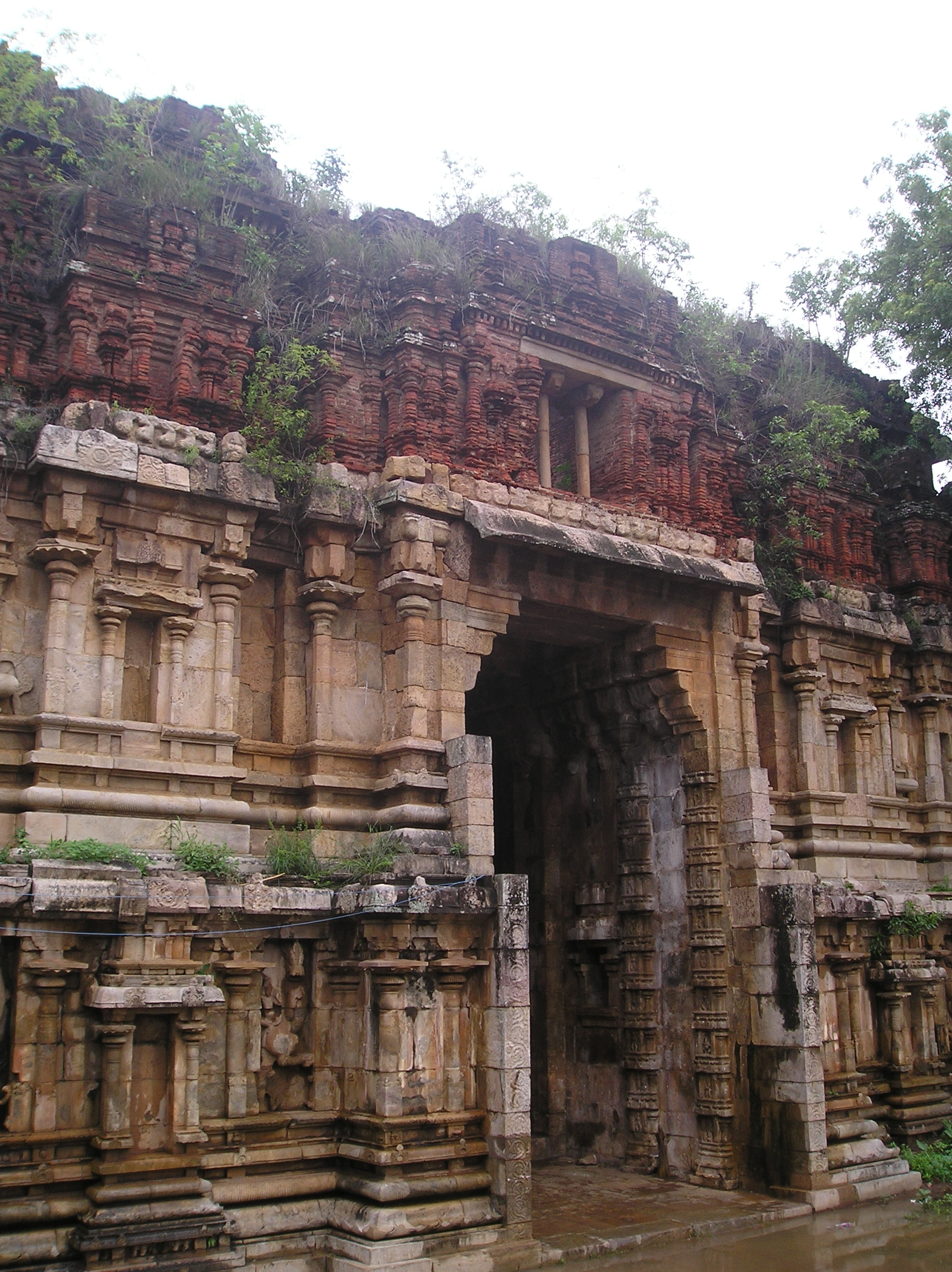
Pazhayarai Gopuram view

The city of Pazhayarai was one of the capital towns of the Chola empire. The temple is a part of the series of temples built by Aditya Chola (871-907 CE) along the banks of river Cauvery to commemorate his victory in the Tirupurambiyam battle. The temple is revered by the verses of the 7-8th-century saint poets Appar, Sambandar and Sundarar in Tevaram and classified as Paadal Petra Sthalam. This temple is in the centre of the once famous Pazhayarai city, surrounded by Pazhayari Vadathali in the north, Araimetrali in the west and Thenthali in the south. This is the birthplace of Mangayarkarasiyar, a saint amongst the 63 nayanmars. It is one of the shrines of the Vaippu Sthalams sung by Tamil Saivite Nayanars Sambandar and Appar. The temple is counted as one of the temples built on the banks of River Kaveri. It is located on the banks of both Mudikondan River and Tirumalarajanar River, tributaries of river Kaveri.

== The temple ==
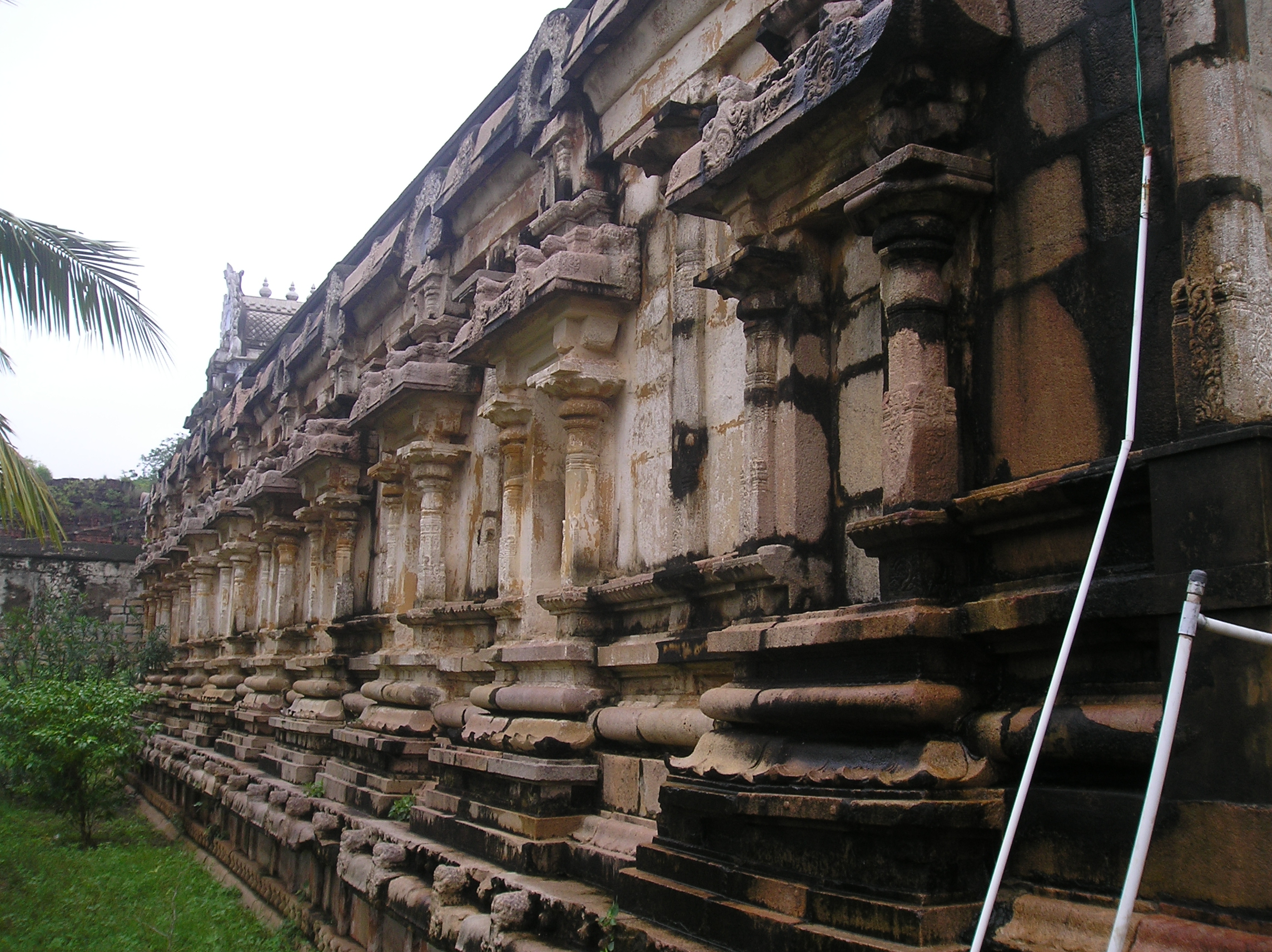
Temple view

The temple has a gopuram (gateway tower) in dilapidated state. The gopuram is believed to have been constructed during the later part of 12th-13th century by Later Cholas. The second precinct has a two-tiered gopuram. The sanctum and the walls around the sanctum are built in granite and the structure houses the shrine of Someswarar in the form of lingam (aniconic form of Shiva). There is a shrine for his consort Someswari and the navagrahas. The scene of Ravana lifting Mount Kailash is carved in this temple. There is a sculpture of Narasimha, an avatar of Vishnu, believed to be made during the Chola period. The first of the two shows the fight between the eight-handed Narasimha and Hiranyakashipu. The other panel depicts the earlier scene where Prahlada prays and Narasimha emerges from a pillar. The other panel shows Narsimha tearing the insides of the demon thrown in his legs. The image of Ardhanareeswarar is considered a sculptural masterpiece.

== Kumbhabhishekham 29 January 2016 ==
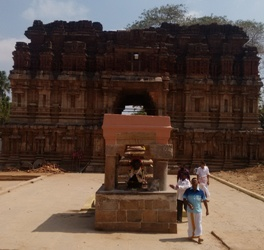
Entrance

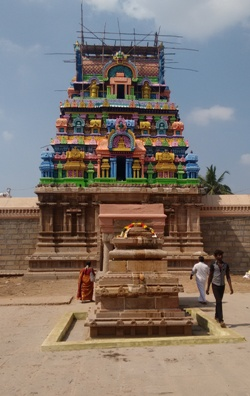
Inner gopura

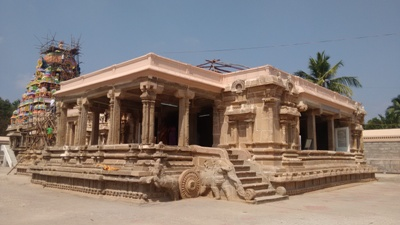
Shrine of the presiding deity

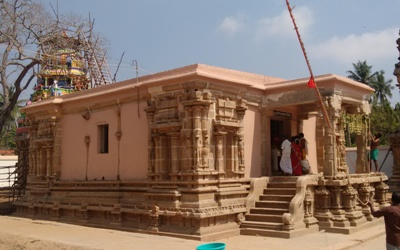
Shrine

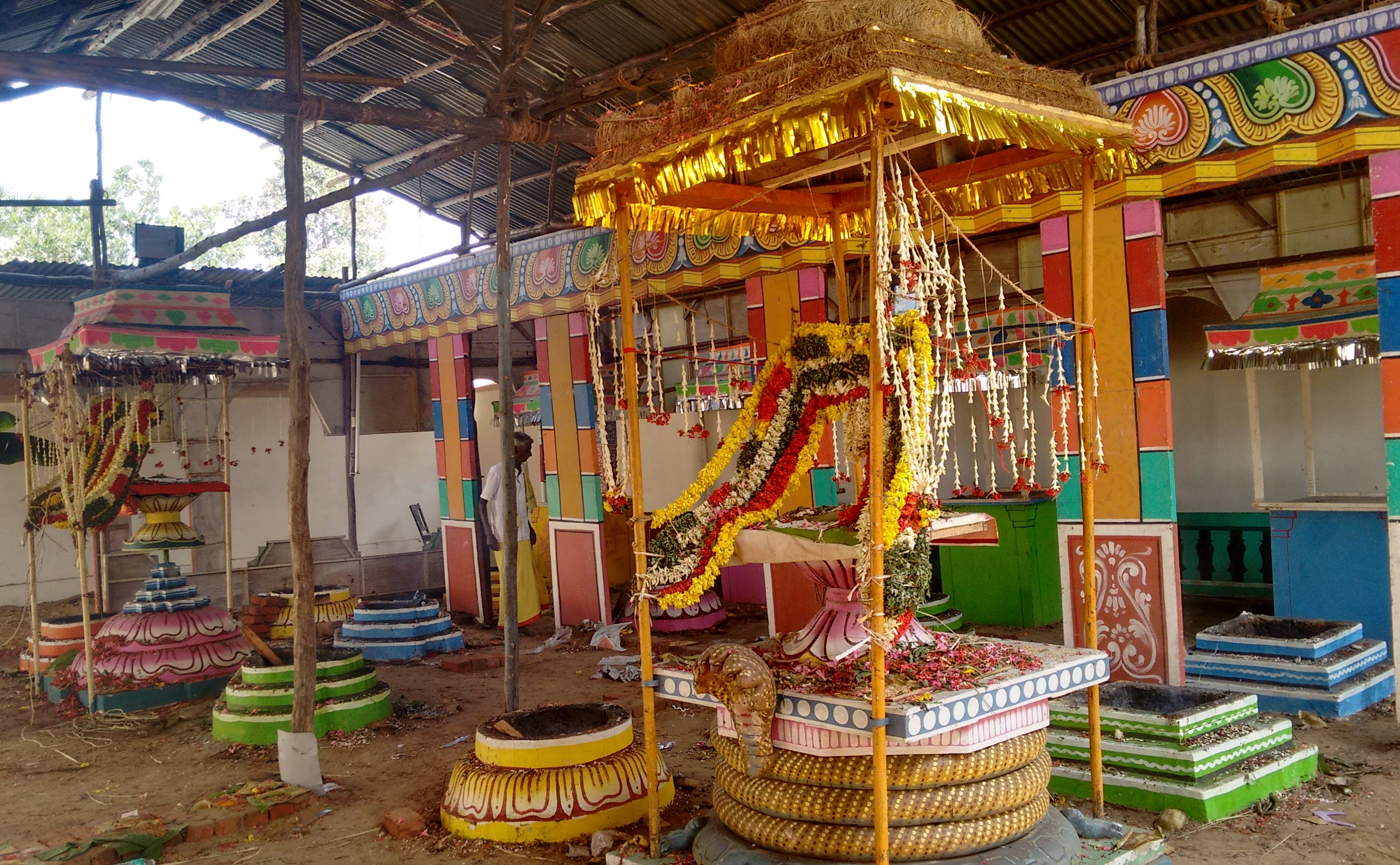
Yaga-shala for Kumbhabhishekham
