= Sakthivanesvara Temple =

Shiva temple in Tamil Nadu, India

Satthi Muttram Temple

- Location in Tamil Nadu

Religion
- Affiliation: Hinduism
- District: Tanjore
- Deity: Sakthivanesvara (Shiva)

Location
- Location: Patteswaram
- State: Tamil Nadu
- Country: India
- Coordinates: 10°55′36″N 79°20′37″E

Architecture
- Type: Dravidian architecture

Sakthivanesvara Temple (சக்திவனேஸ்வரர் கோயில்) is a temple dedicated to the Hindu god Shiva located in a small village called Thirusakthimutram, near another small (but relatively better-known) village, Patteswaram. The nearest urban centre, about seven kilometres (four-and-a-half miles) away, is Kumbakonam in the Indian state of Tamil Nadu. Here the presiding deity Sakthivanesvara is a form of the Hindu god Shiva, in which his usual worship symbol the Lingam is hugged by his consort Parvati, hence he is also known as Sivakozhundeesvara and Sakthi Mutham. It is believed that when one prays to Sakthivanesvara with faith, one is blessed with the life partner of one's choice.

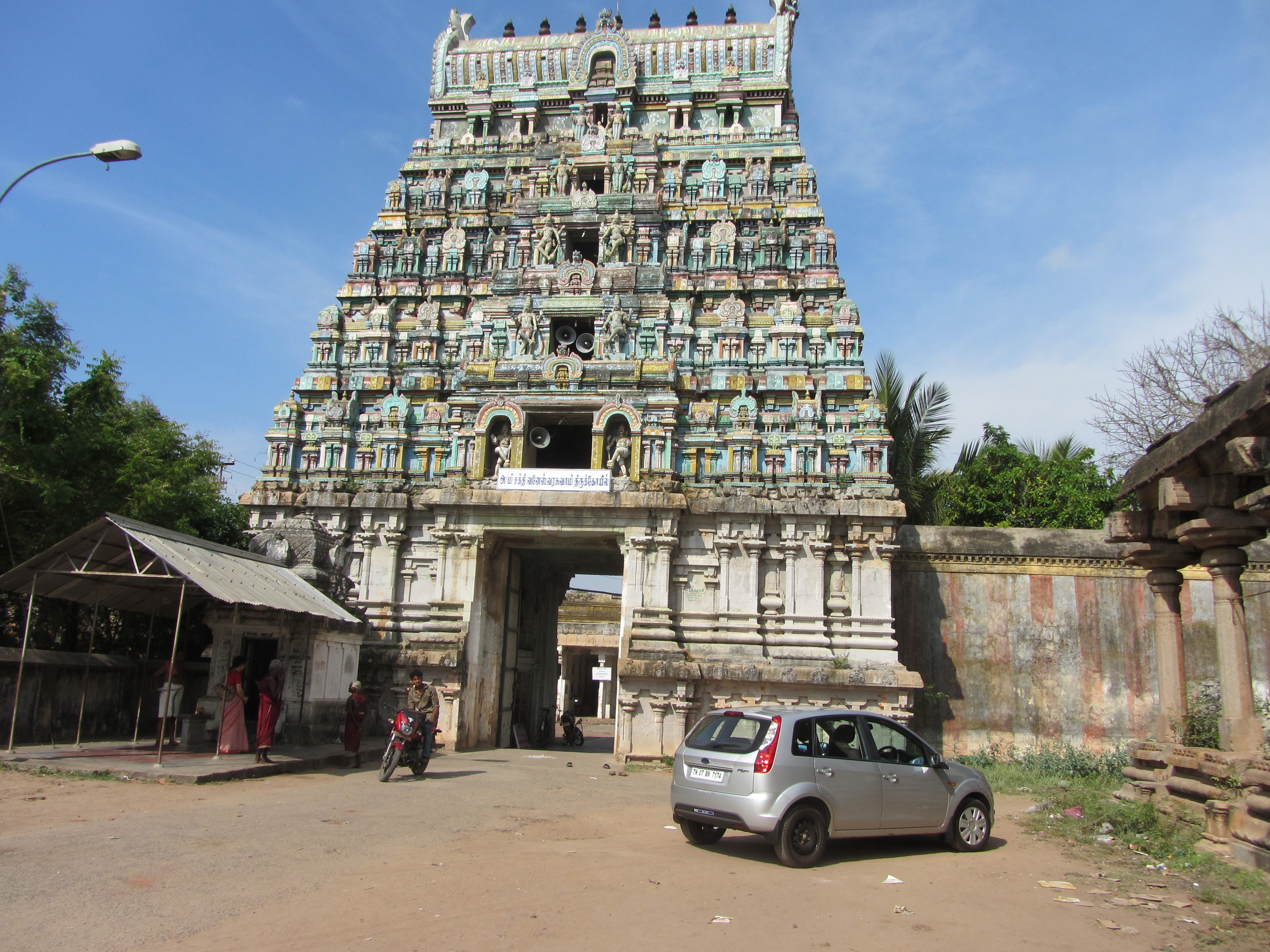
Gopuram of Thirusakthimutram

== Significance ==
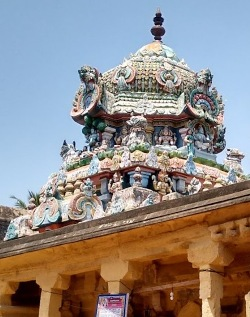
Vimana of presiding deity

It is one of the shrines of the 275 Paadal Petra Sthalams - Shiva Sthalams glorified in the early medieval Tevaram poems by Tamil Saivite Nayanar Tirugnanasambandar and Thirunavukkarasar. The temple is counted as one of the temples built on the banks of River Kaveri. It is located on the banks of Kudamurutti, a tributary of river Kaveri.

== Legend ==
Parvathi was doing penance at this place to seek the hands of Shiva. Shiva is believed to have appeared as a column of fire and Parvathi could not bear the heat, she embraced Shiva, give the name Sakthimutram (meaning, Sakthi (Parvathi) embracing Shiva).
