= Panchavan Madeviyar Pallippadai Temple =

Religion
- Affiliation: Hinduism
- District: Thanjavur
- Deity: Lord Shiva

Location
- Location: Patteeswaram village near Kumbakonam
- State: Tamil Nadu
- Country: India
- Interactive map of Panchavan Madeviyar Pallippadai Temple
- Coordinates: 10.92352°N 79.33782°E

Panchavan Madeviyar Pallippadai Temple (Panchavanmadeviswaram) is a Pallippadai temple located at Pazhayarai village near Kumbakonam, Thanjavur District, Tamil Nadu, India. This Pallippadai temple was built by Rajendra Chola for his step mother Panchavan Madeviyar

== History ==
Panchavan Madeviyar is one of the many wives of Rajaraja the Great. After her death, her step son, Rajendra Chola rested her ashes in an urn here (which the model can still seen above the lingam) & built a Shiva temple on top of it. This temple was at bad state till 1978 when the Tamil Nadu Archaeology Department renovated the temple.
