= Kalyanasundaresar Temple, Nallur =

Shiva temple in Tamil Nadu, India

Kalyanasundaresar Temple
- Tirunallur Temple
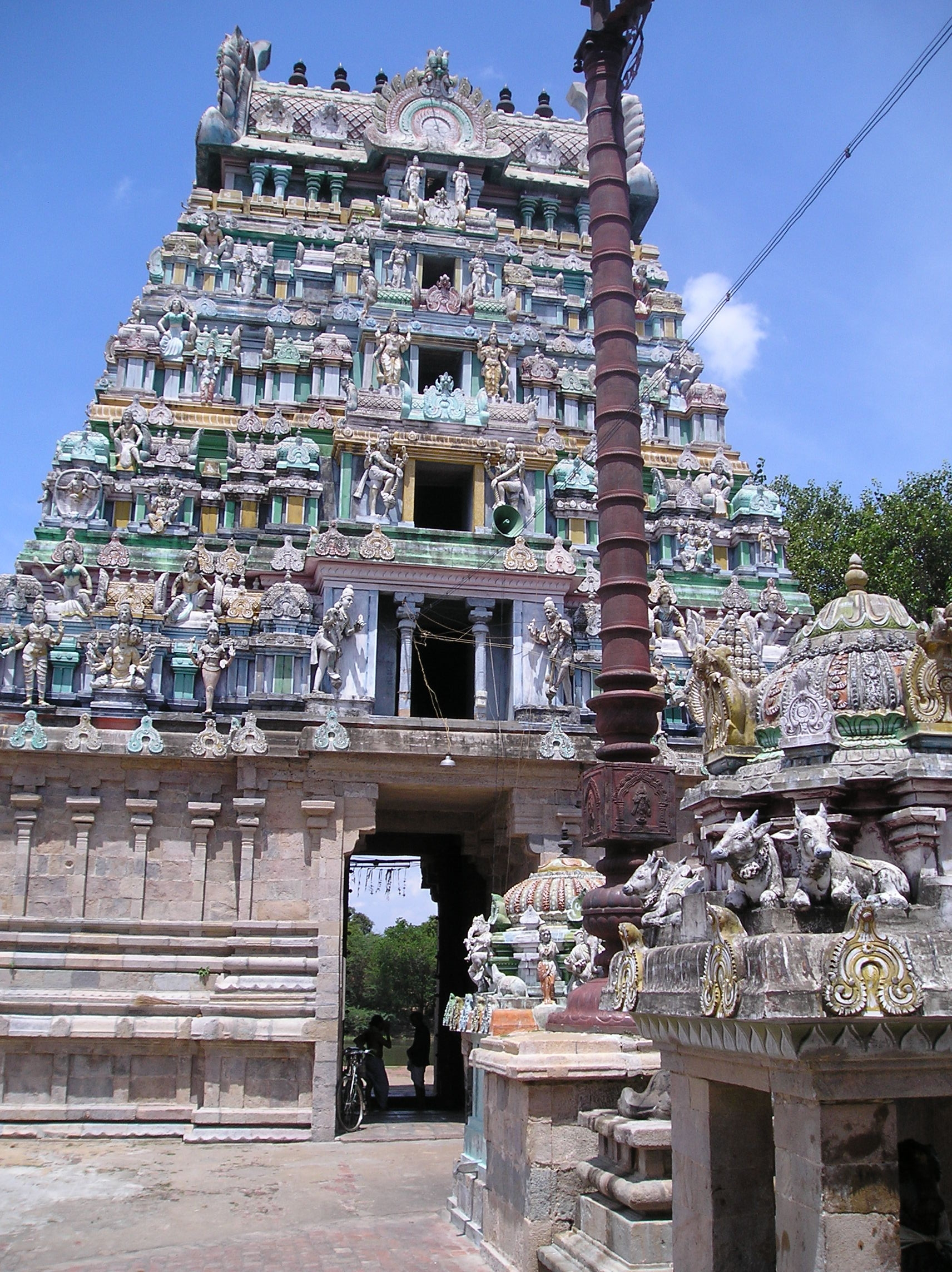
- View of the Kalyanasundaresar temple tower

- Location in Tamil Nadu

Religion
- Affiliation: Hinduism
- District: Thanjavur
- Deity: Kalyanasundaresar (Shiva)

Location
- Location: Nallur
- State: Tamil Nadu
- Country: India
- Coordinates: 10°55′N 79°19′E

Architecture
- Type: Dravidian architecture

Kalyanasundaresar Temple, Nallur (Tamil: கல்யாணசுந்தரேஸ்வரர் கோயில், நல்லூர்) or Thirunallur is a Hindu temple dedicated to the deity Shiva in Nallur, Tamil Nadu, India. It is located 10 km (6.2 mi) away from Kumbakonam, 6 km (3.7 mi) east of Thirukkarugavur, and 30 km (19 mi) south of Thanjavur.

At the temple, Shiva is worshiped as Kalyansundaresar and is represented by the lingam. His consort Parvati is depicted as Girisundari. The presiding deity is revered in the 7th-century-CE Tamil Saiva canonical work, the Tevaram, written by Tamil saint poets known as the Nayanars and classified as Paadal Petra Sthalam. The legend of the temple is associated with sage Agastya and Amaraneethi Nayanar, one of the 63 Nayanars. The lingam in the temple is believed to change colours five times during the daytime.

The temple complex has three precincts and houses two gateway towers known as gopurams. All the central shrines of the temple are located in an artificial hillock, while the shrine of Kali is located in the third precinct in the basement. The original masonry structure was built during the Chola dynasty in the 9th century CE, while later expansions are attributed to Vijayanagar rulers of the Sangama Dynasty (1336–1485 CE), the Saluva Dynasty, and the Tuluva Dynasty (1491–1570 CE). The temple has been maintained and administered by the Thiruvaduthurai Adheenam since the early 13th century.

== Legend ==
According to the Hindu legend, the god Shiva sent the sage Agastya to this place to balance the weight of the deities attending his marriage with Parvati. At the spot where the temple now stands, Agastya witnessed the marriage of Shiva and Parvati. The sage installed a lingam (symbol of Shiva) behind the main lingam to worship Shiva.

As per another legend, one of the 63 Nayanars, Amaraneedi Nayanar, spent his life supplying loincloths to the worshipers of Shiva. Shiva wanted to test his devotion and came to him, disguised as a Brahmin. The Brahmin deposited his loin-cloth in the custody of Amaraneethi, which was lost by a divine trick. The Brahmin demanded equal weight in gold as a replacement for his loincloth. The Brahmin placed another loincloth on one side of a scale pan, and Amaraneedi deposited all his wealth on the other side, but it did not balance. Finally, he submitted himself and his wife on the scale pan. Shiva was pleased by the devotion of the Nayanar and bestowed him with all his wishes.

== History ==
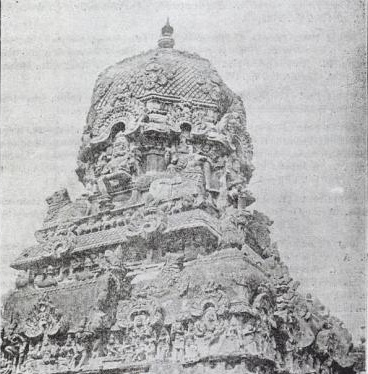
Image of the Vimanam, the shrine over the sanctum

The 7th-century Nayanar saints Sambandar and Appar wrote of the temple in their poetic work, Tevaram. The original masonry and towers date back to the 9th century CE, as seen from an inscription in the structure made by Chola kings. The Chola kings ruled over the region for more than four centuries, from 850 CE to 1280 CE, and were temple patrons. The temple complex dates from the time of the 10th century Medieval Chola king Uttama Chola whose inscriptions are found in its walls. An inscription dated to the fifteenth year of Raja Raja Chola makes a reference to "Panchavanmahadevi chaturvedimanagalam", which is another name for Nallur. There are also inscriptions by Later Chola kings and Hoysala monarchs. The inscriptions from the Chola kings record various gifts like land, sheep, cows, and oil to the temple commemorating various victories of the dynasty. There are a lot of inscriptions from the Sangama Dynasty (1336–1485), Saluva Dynasty, and Tuluva Dynasty (1491–1570) of the Vijayanagara Empire, reflecting gifts to the temple from their rulers. The majority of the gift-related inscriptions are for land endowments, followed by goods, cash endowments, cows, and oil for lighting lamps. The temple has been maintained by the Thiruvaduthurai Adheenam from the early part of the 13th century.

== Architecture ==
The temple is constructed in Dravidian style of architecture. It is classified as Perunkoil (also called Madakkoil): a big temple built on a higher platform of a natural or man-made mounds. Literary evidence is found in the works of Tirugnanasambandhar, who refers the temple as Madakkoil.

The temple has a five-tiered Rajagopuram (gateway tower). The main shrines of the temple are located in an artificial hillock. The images of the presiding deity, Kalyanasundareshwar, in the form of lingam (iconic form of Shiva) on a pedestal, occupies the main sanctum. The second lingam, believed to be installed by sage Agastya, is in the sanctum. The walls on the interior of the sanctum have sculptural representations of Shiva and Parvati on the west, Vishnu on the north, and Brahma on the south. The shrine of Girisundari Amman, the consort of Kalyanasundareshwar, is located in the first precinct facing west. The temple also has a bronze image of Nataraja, the cosmic dance form of Shiva. Nataraja in the temple is depicted with eight hands and in a standing posture over the head of a demon. The image is considered to be one of the nine dance poses of Shiva, called Nava tandavam. The temple has sculptural and metallic images of Ganapathi (elephant god), sage Agastya, and the three Shaiva saints: Appar, Sambandar, and Sundarar. The temple also has an image of Somaskanda (a representation of Shiva with his consort Uma, and Skanda as a child), which is considered similar to the one present in the Thyagaraja temple in Thiruvarur. The third prakaram downstairs houses a separate shrine for the Hindu god Kali.

The temple has a large tank called Saptasagaram, located outside the main entrance. The temple complex is enclosed by granite walls, built around the third precinct.

== Religious significance ==
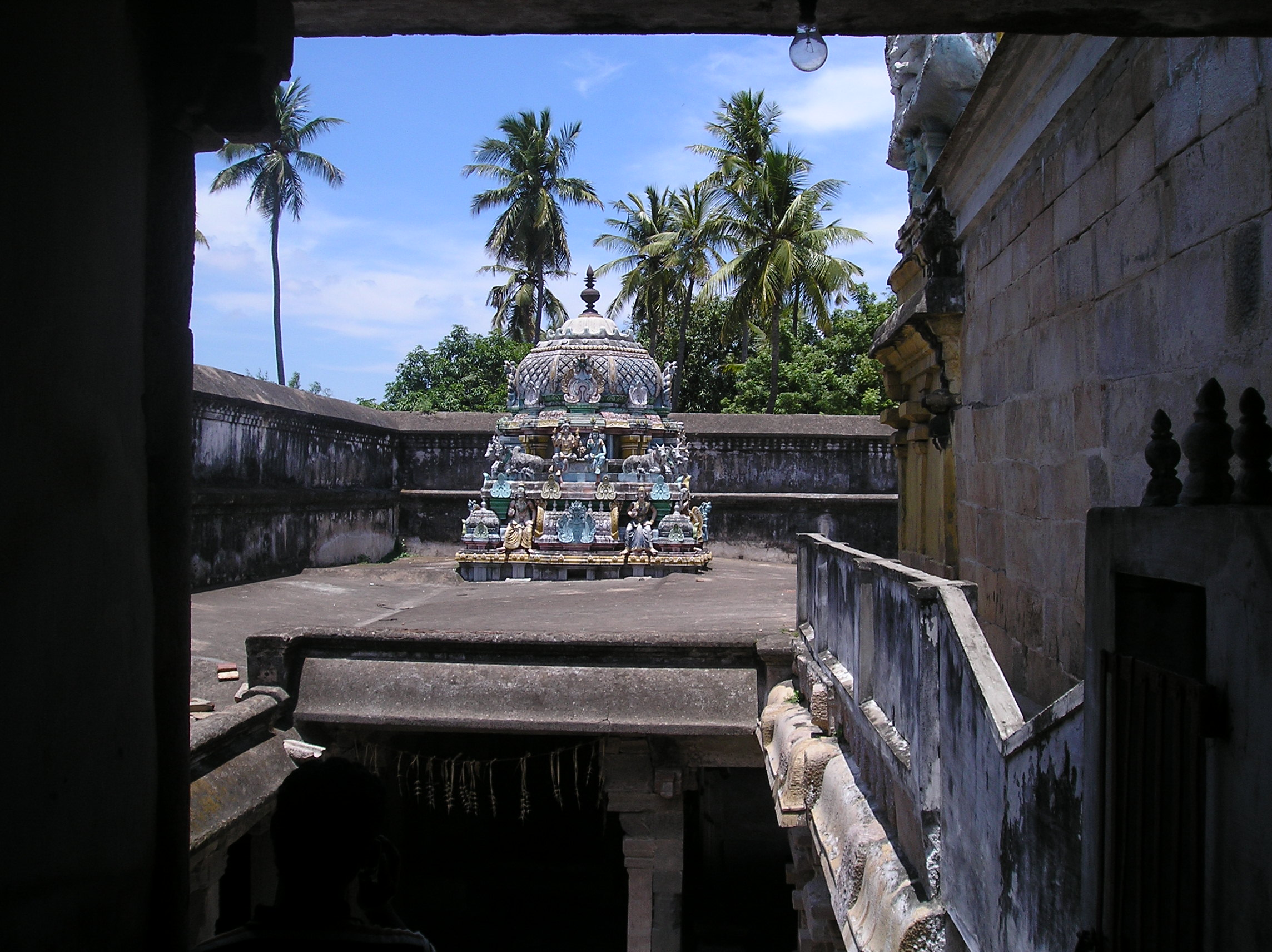
A shrine in the second precinct of the temple as seen from the hillock

Tirugnana Sambandar, a 7th-century Tamil Shaivite poet, venerated Kalyanasundaresar in eleven verses in Tevaram, compiled as the Second Tirumurai. Appar, a contemporary of Sambandar, also venerated Kalyanasundaresar in ten verses in Tevaram, compiled as the Sixth Tirumurai. As the temple is revered in Tevaram, it is classified as Paadal Petra Sthalam, one of the 276 temples mentioned in the Saiva canon. The temple is counted as one of the temples built on the banks of River Kaveri. It is located on the banks of Kudamurutti, a tributary of river Kaveri. The temple is counted as the 20th temple on the southern bank of Cauvery that are recorded in the canon.

Tamil
பெண்ணமருந் திருமேனி யுடையீர் பிறங்குசடைதாழப்
பண்ணமரும் நான்மறையே பாடியாடல் பயில்கின்றீர்
திண்ணமரும் பைம்பொழிலும் வயலுஞ்சூழ்ந்த திருநல்லூர்
மண்ணமருங் கோயிலே கோயிலாக மகிழ்ந்தீரே.

IPA
pɛ̝˞ɳɳʌmʌɾɨn̺ t̪ɪɾɨme:n̺ɪ· ɪ̯ɨ˞ɽʌjɪ̯i:r pɪɾʌŋgɨsʌ˞ɽʌɪ̯ðɑ˞:ɻʌp
pʌ˞ɳɳʌmʌɾɨm n̺ɑ:n̺mʌɾʌjɪ̯e· pɑ˞:ɽɪɪ̯ɑ˞:ɽʌl pʌɪ̯ɪlgʲɪn̺d̺ʳi:r
t̪ɪ˞ɳɳʌmʌɾɨm pʌɪ̯mbo̞˞ɻɪlɨm ʋʌɪ̯ʌlɨɲʤu˞:ɻn̪d̪ə t̪ɪɾɨn̺ʌllu:r
mʌ˞ɳɳʌmʌɾɨŋ ko:ɪ̯ɪle· ko:ɪ̯ɪlɑ:xə mʌçɪ˞ɻn̪d̪i:ɾe· .

You have a holy body in which a lady stays.

When the glittering caṭai is hanging low, you are practising dance singing the four Vēdas in which there are melody-types. In Tirunallūr which is surrounded by fields and verdant gardens of great strength. You are rejoicing in dwelling in the temple which is desired by the people of this world.

The temple tank, Sapthasagaram, is considered sacred. Kunti, the mother of Pandavas from the Mahabaratha period, is believed to have taken a holy dip in the tank, worshiping Kalyanasundaresar. This incident is recorded in some of the inscriptions in the temple, but this story is not even mentioned in Mahabharatha.

The lingam in the temple is believed to change colours five times during the day. It takes the colour of copper from 6:00–8:24, light red from 8:25–10:48, molten gold from 10:49–15:12, unknown colour from 13:13–15:36, and emerald green from 15:37–18:00. The vilwa tree in the temple is believed to be the first of its kind in the planet and hence called "Aadhi tree". Gananatha, a form of Shiva, in the form of balipeeta (platform for offering), is located in the temple. It is the only other place outside Varanasi, where Gananatha is found in the form.

== Gallery ==
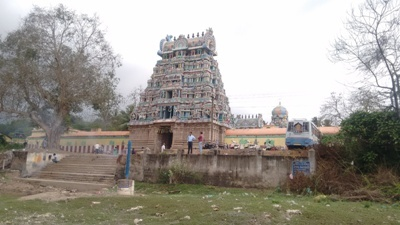

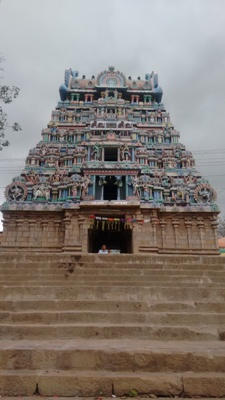

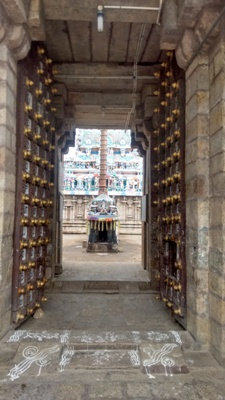

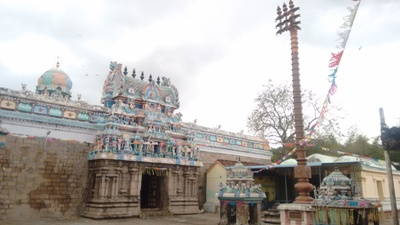

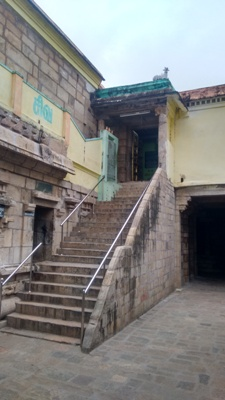

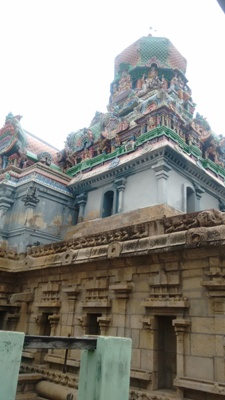

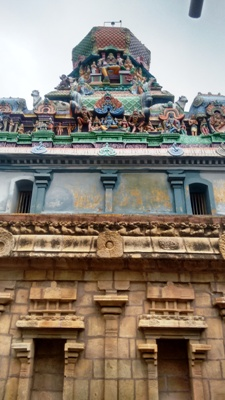
