= Amaraneedi Nayanar =

Hindu poet-saint

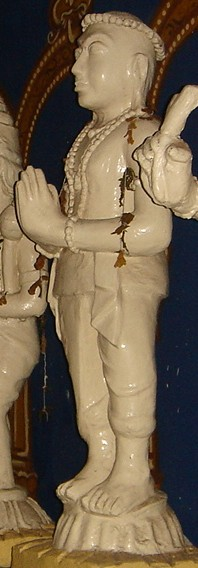

Personal life
- Born: Amaranidhi Chetti; 9th Century CE; Pazhayarai
- Honors: Nayanar saint,

Religious life
- Religion: Hinduism
- Philosophy: Shaivism, Bhakti

Amaraneedi Nayanar, also known as Amarneethi (Nayanar), Amarneeti (Nayanar), Amarniti (Nayanar), Amar-Nidhi (Nayanar) and Amarneethiyar, was a Nayanar saint, venerated in the Hindu sect of Shaivism. He is generally counted as the seventh in the list of 63 Nayanars.

== Life ==
The life of Amaraneedi Nayanar is described in the Periya Puranam by Sekkizhar (twelfth century), which is a hagiography of the 63 Nayanars.

Amaraneedi Nayanar was born in Pazhayarai, the ancient capital of the Chola kingdom. He was a vaishya, member of the merchant caste. Amaraneedi was a trader of gold, jewels and clothes. Amaraneedi was a staunch devotee of Shiva, the patron god of Shaivism. He donated food and clothes to devotees of Shiva. He would especially gift Kowpeenam (loin-cloth) to Shaiva ascetics. Once, the merchant visited the Kalyanasundaresar Temple of Nallur (Tirunallur) dedicated to Shiva, to attend the temple festival. He worshipped at the Shiva temple and stayed at Nallur for a few days. One day, Shiva came to Amaraneedi's house disguised as a Brahmin Brahmachari (a celibate member of the priest caste). The young Brahmachari had matted hair and wore only a Kowpeenam. He was adored with the Tripundra (Shaiva marks on the forehead) and carried a staff with two Kowpeenams on it. The Brahmachari told Amaraneedi that he had come having heard of the merchant's generosity. Amaraneedi asked him for a chance to serve him, the Brahmachari lad consented and kept one of his dried Kowpeenams in the merchant's custody and left for a bath.

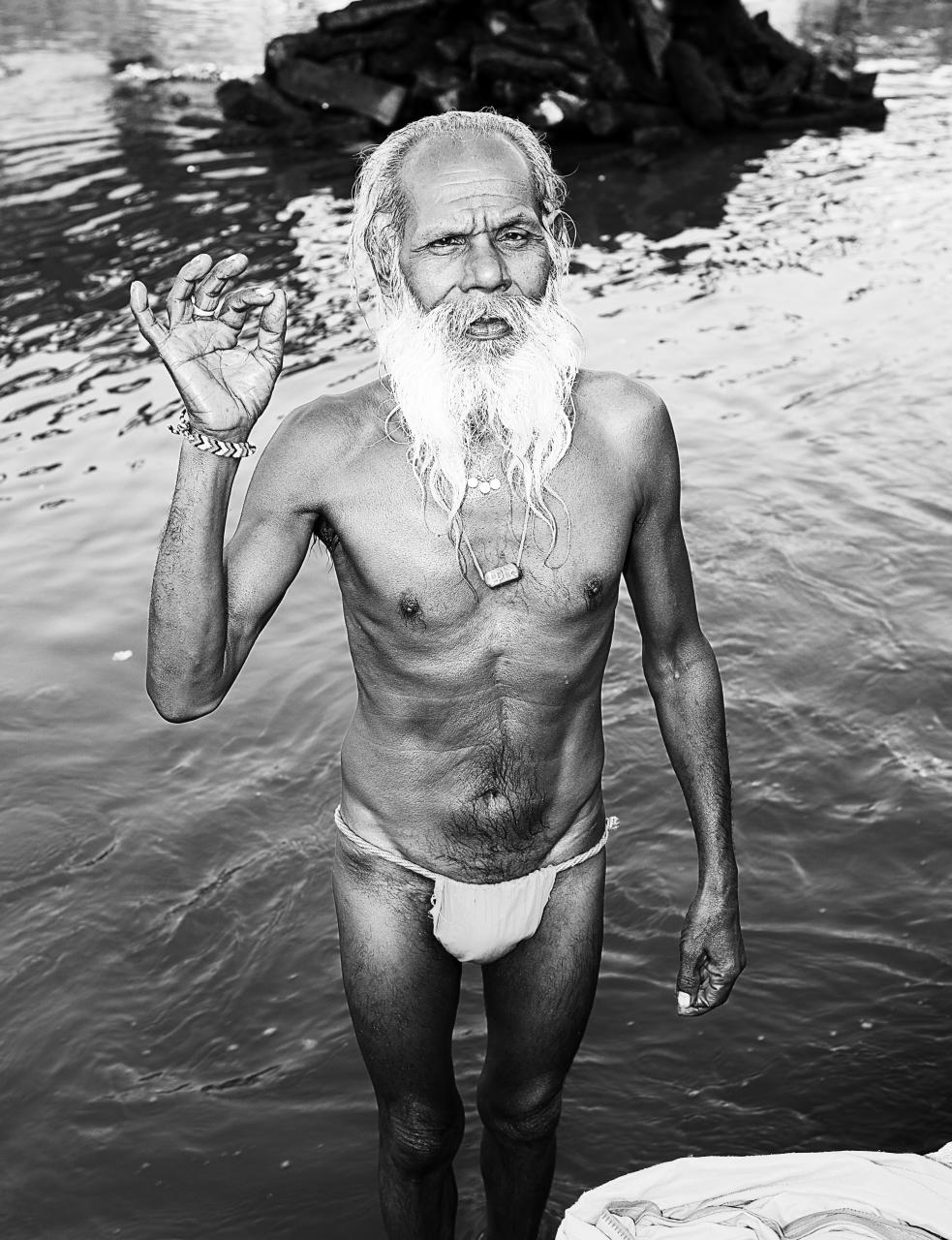
An ascetic wearing the Kowpeenam. Amarneedi is described to donate Kowpeenams to ascetics.

While Amaraneedi kept the Kowpeenam in a safe place, Shiva caused it to be mysteriously disappear. When the Brahmachari returned, he asked for his dried Kowpeenam for a change of dress as his other Kowpeenam on his staff was drenched in the rain. Amaraneedi could not find the Kowpeenam where he left it and searched the house in vain. The dejected Amaraneedi returned with his wife and kin and another Kowpeenam. He apologised and prostrated before the Brahmachari and offered a Kowpeenam of a superior quality. The enraged Brahmachari refused to accept it and after much persuasion, demanded a Kowpeenam equal in weight of the lost Kowpeenam.

In a weighing scale, the Brahmachari placed his wet Kowpeenam from the staff in a pan and Amaraneedi placed his Kowpeenam in the other pan. As the Brahmachari's Kowpeenam was weightier, he started putting all the Kowpeenams he had. Then he added silken and cotton garments, but the Kowpeenam pan did not rise from the ground. Finally, Amaraneedi started to add all his wealth, including gold, silver and jewels, in the other pan. After Amaraneedi realized all his wealth could not match the weight of Kowpeenam, he asked the Brahmachari if he, his wife and child can ascend the pan. On consent of the Brahmachari, he circumbulated the pan and implored Shiva that his devotion and service was true, the pans should become equal in weight. He recited the Panchakshara mantra, dedicated to Shiva and got into the pan. Immediately, the pans were balanced. Men and celestial beings showered the devotee with flowers. The Brahmachari disappeared and Shiva appeared with his consort Parvati and blessed the family. The family had become the "possessions" of Shiva. The weighing scale converted into a heavenly chariot and transported them to Kailash, Shiva's abode.

Besides the Periya Puranam, the tale is told in the temple lore of the Kalyanasundaresar Temple. Kalyanasundaresar, the presiding form of Shiva, is said to have tested Amaraneedi Nayanar in the guise of the Brahmachari boy.

The tale of Amaraneedi (called Iruvadandari in the account) is also recalled in the thirteenth-century Telugu Basava Purana of Palkuriki Somanatha in brief and with some variation. Shiva is said to have come disguised as a devotee and given his blanket and loin-cloth for safe keeping. At the end, only Iruvadandari ascended the pan and was made a pramatha, an attendant of Shiva.

== Remembrance ==
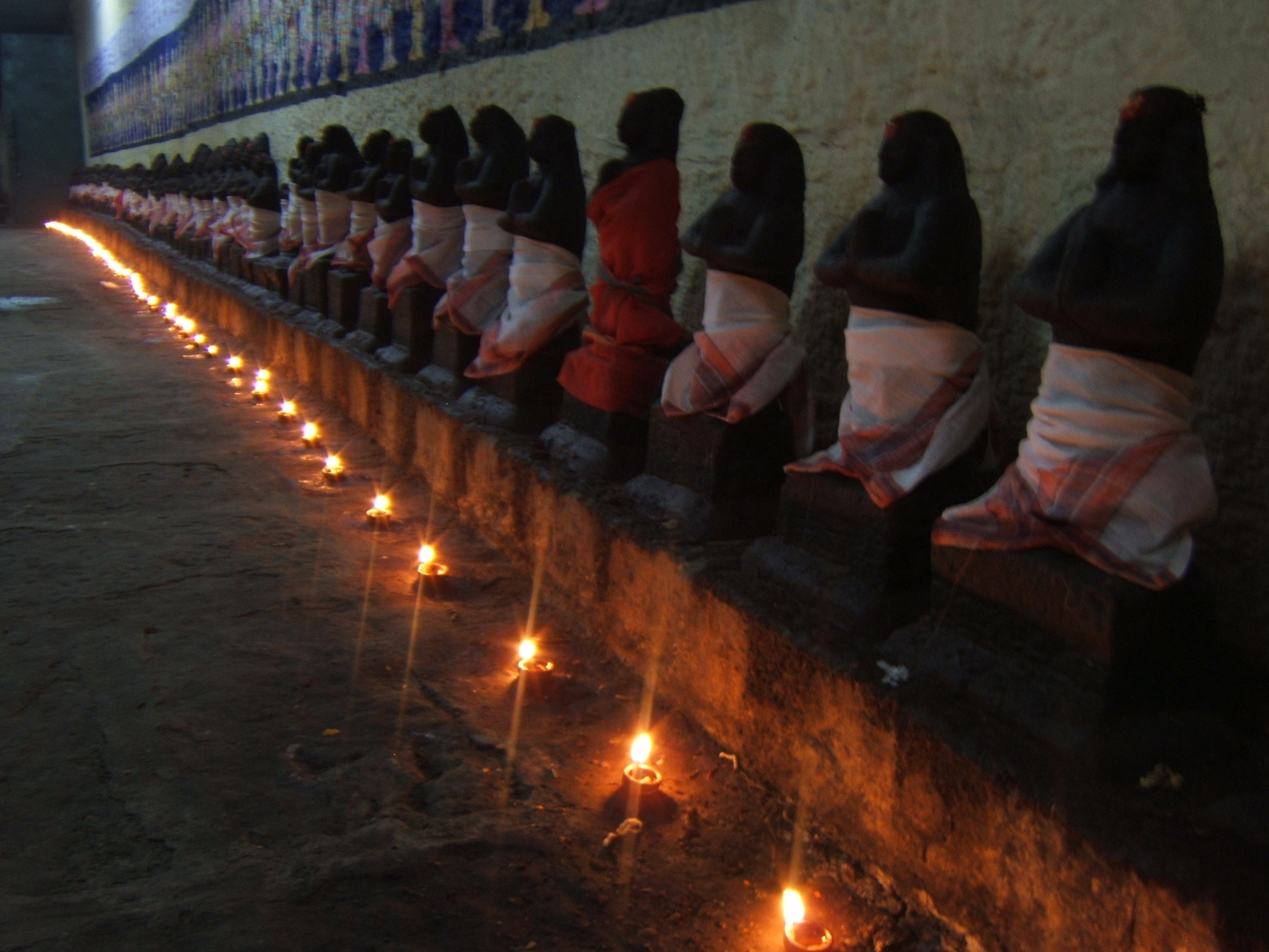
The images of the Nayanars are found in many Shiva temples in Tamil Nadu.

One of the most prominent Nayanars, Appar (Tirunavukkarasar, 7th century) dedicates a hymn to Amaraneedi Nayanar, recalling his tale while praising the temple of Nallur. Another famed Nayanar, Sundarar (8th century) venerates Amaraneedi Nayanar in the Tiruthonda Thogai, a hymn to Nayanar saints. He is described as adorning a soft jasmine garland.

Amaraneedi Nayanar is worshipped in the Tamil month of Aani, when the moon enters the Pūrva Phalguṇī nakshatra (lunar mansion). He is depicted with a crown and folded hands (see Anjali mudra). He receives collective worship as part of the 63 Nayanars. Their icons and brief accounts of his deeds are found in many Shiva temples in Tamil Nadu. Their images are taken out in procession in festivals.
