= Nathan Kovil =

Hindu temple of Vishnu near Kumbakonam, India

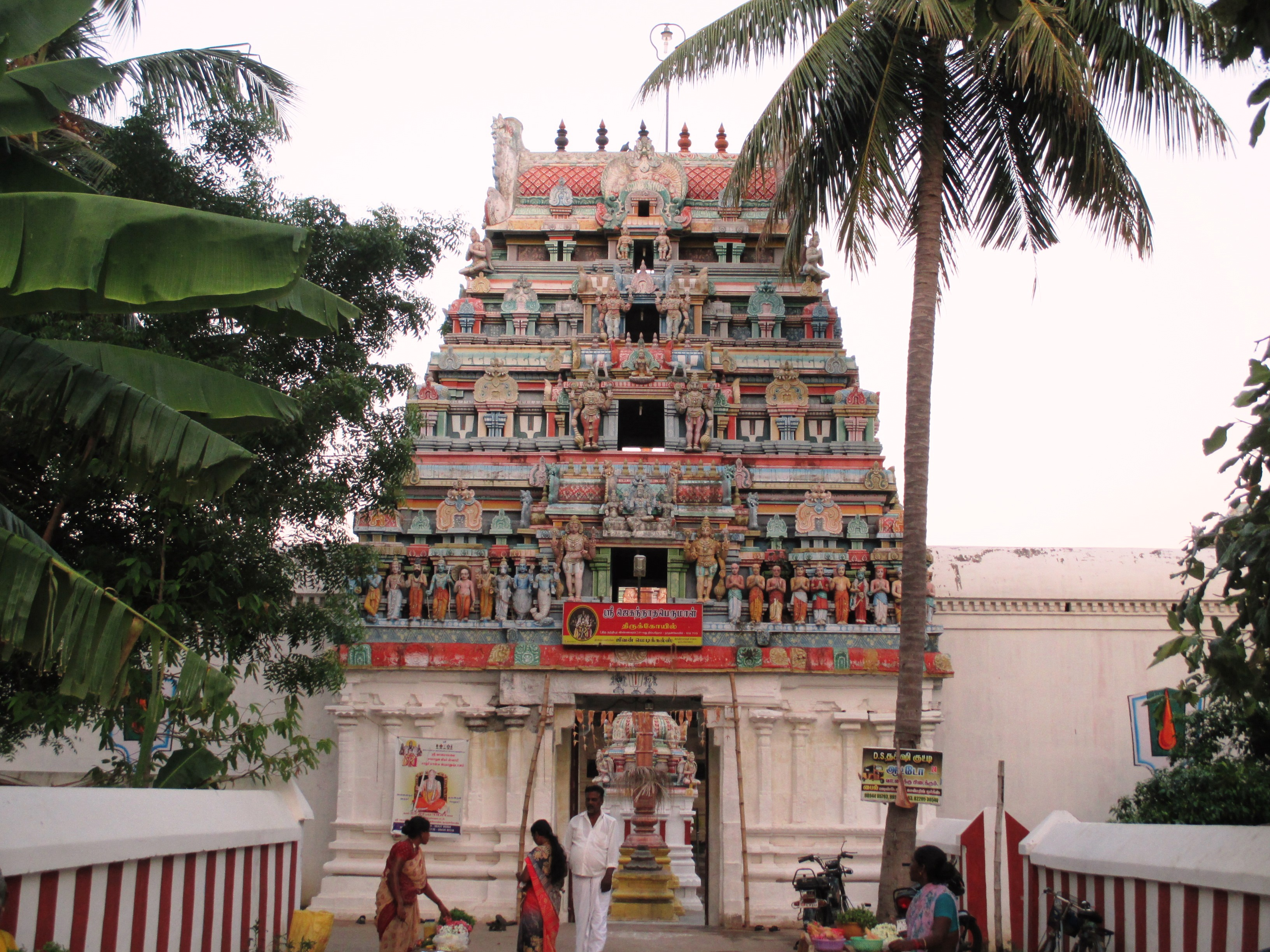

- Location in Tamil Nadu

Religion
- Affiliation: Hinduism
- District: Thanjavur
- Deity: Jagannathan, Nathannathan, Shenbagavalli

Location
- Location: Nathan Kovil, Kumbakonam
- State: Tamil Nadu
- Country: India
- Coordinates: 11°10′39″N 79°46′45″E

Architecture
- Type: Dravidian architecture

Nathan Kovil or Thiru Nandipura Vinnagaram Temple in Nathan Kovil, a village in the outskirts of Kumbakonam in the South Indian state of Tamil Nadu, is dedicated to the Hindu god Vishnu. Constructed in the Dravidian style of architecture, the temple is glorified in the Nalayira Divya Prabandham, the early medieval Tamil canon of the Alvar saints from the 6th–9th centuries CE. It is one of the 108 Divya Desams dedicated to Vishnu, who is worshipped as Jagannathan and his consort Lakshmi as Shenbagavalli.

Nandi, the sacred bull of Shiva, is believed to have got his curses relieved by worshipping Vishnu here and hence the place is called Nandipuram. All the shrines and water bodies associated with the temple are named after Nandi. Six rituals are performed every day and two festivals are celebrated every year in the temple. The Fridays during the Tamil month of Aipasi are believed to be auspicious to worship Shenbagavalli.

== Legend ==
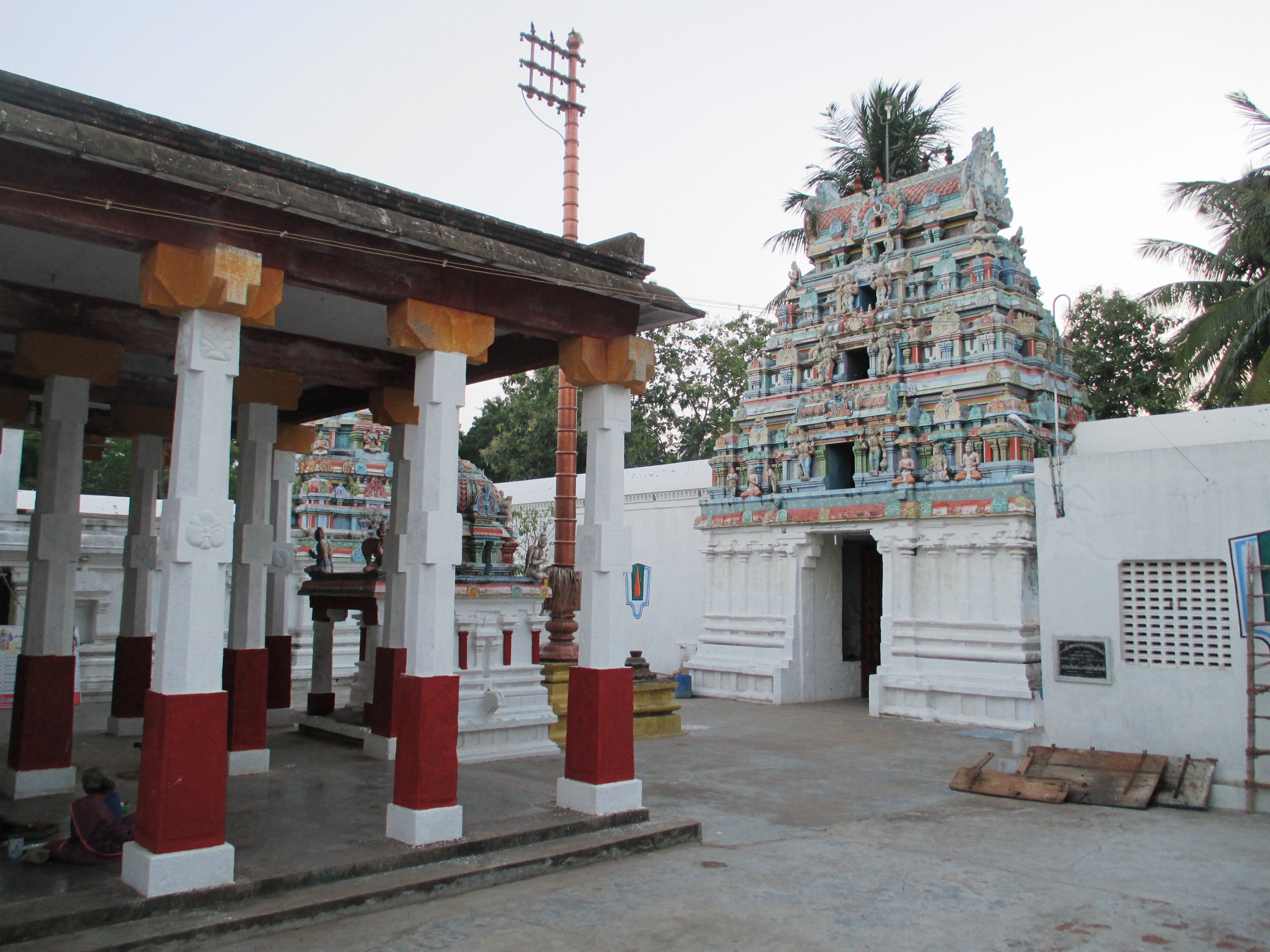
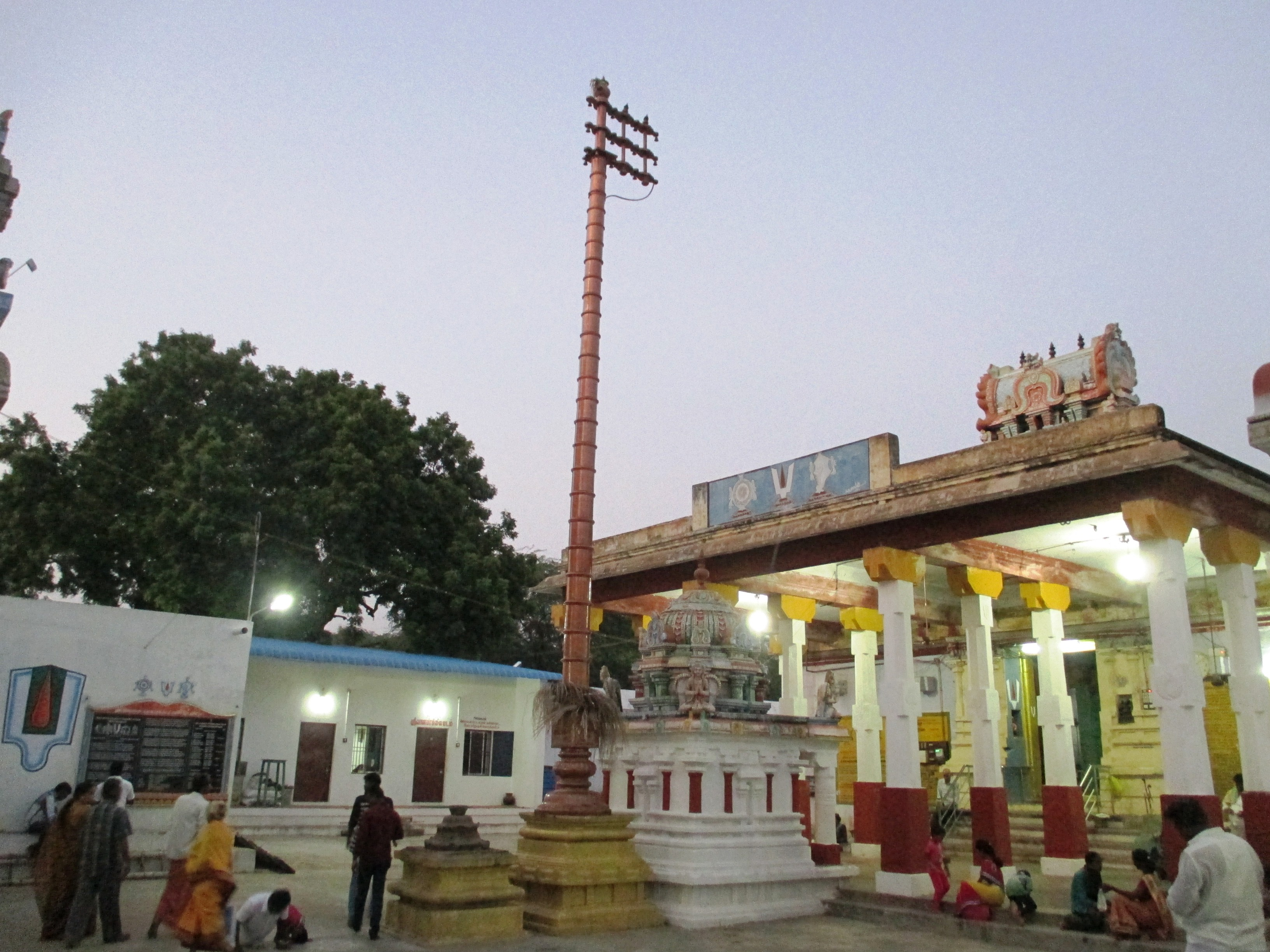
Shrines in the temple

As per Hindu legend, Nandi, the sacred bull of Shiva, did not respect the dvarapalakas, the gatekeepers of Vishnu. They cursed Nandi that his body would suffer oppressive heat. Nandi informed it to his lord Shiva, who advised him to do penance in Shenbakaranyam (also called Nadhivanam), a forest near modern-day Kumbakonam. It is the place where Lakshmi, the consort of Vishnu was doing penance to get into the chest of Vishnu. Vishnu was impressed by the penance of Nandi and got his curse relieved. As per another legend, Lakshmi did penance at this place to seek a place in Vishnu's chest. Vishnu was impressed by her devotion and took Lakshmi her in his chest. The image of Lakshmi in the form of Shenbagavalli faces west indicating the legend. Devotees worship Shenbagavalli of the temple during the Tamil month of Aipasi and believe that their wishes will be fulfilled.

== Architecture ==
The temple has a 3-tier gateway tower, the rajagopuram. Since Nandi got relieved of his curse here, the names of the temples bodies are named after Nandi; the temple tank is called Nandi Theertham, the vimanam as Nandi Vimanam, the place called Nandipuram and other water body as Nandi Pushkarani. The main sanctum houses the image of the presiding deity, Srinivasa Perumal, the metal image of the festival deity, Jagannatha, the images of Bhoodevi and Sridevi on either sides of Srinivasa. The image of Nandi, which is otherwise part of Shiva temples, is present in the main sanctum. There is a separate shrine for Shenbagavalli Thayar. The rectangular walls around the temple enclose all the shrines and some of seven water bodies associated with the temple.

The place was once the capital of Cholas who did benevolent contributions to the temple. During the regime of Thanjavur Nayaks, the temple received contributions from Vijayaranga Chokkappa Nayak. The temple is maintained and administered by the Vanamamalai Mutt.

== Festivals and religious practices ==
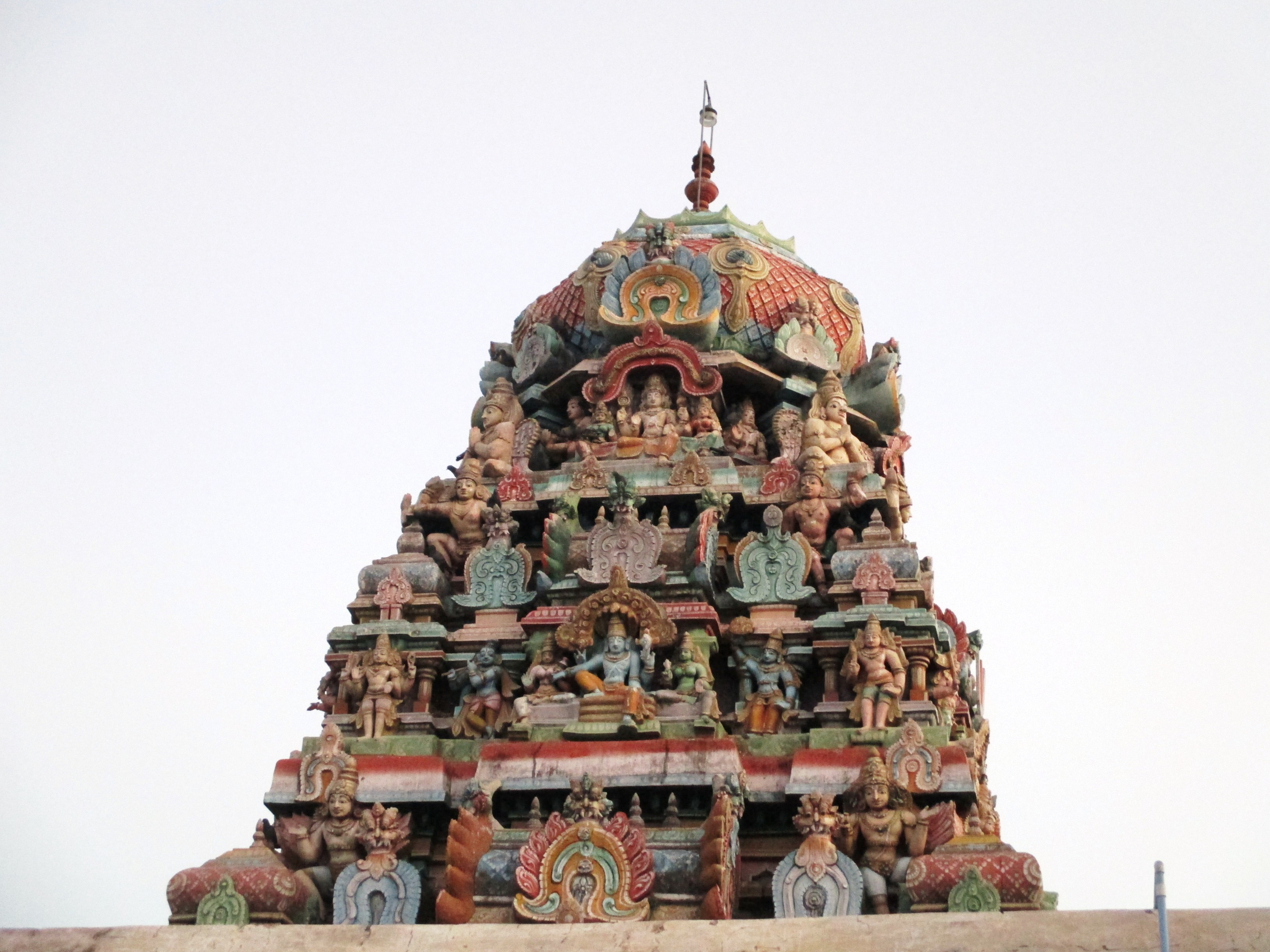
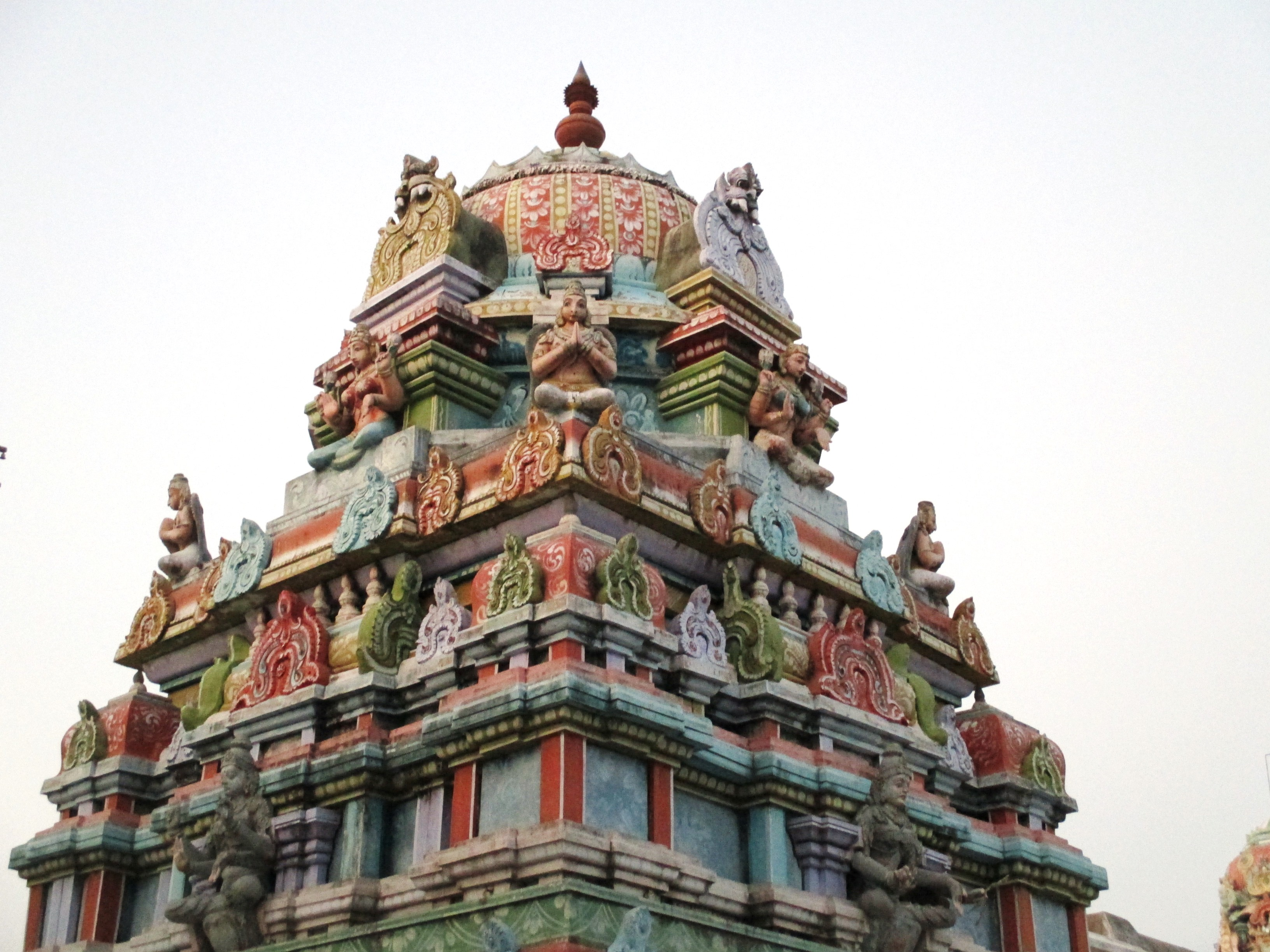
vimana of the presiding deities

The temple priests perform the pooja (rituals) during festivals and on a daily basis. As at other Vishnu temples of Tamil Nadu, the priests belong to the Vaishnavaite community, a Brahmin sub-caste. The temple follows the Thenkalai sampradaayam and agamas of South Indian Vaishnavism. The temple rituals are performed six times a day: Ushathkalam at 7 a.m., Kalasanthi at 8:00 a.m., Uchikalam at 12:00 p.m., Sayarakshai at 6:00 p.m., Irandamkalam at 7:00 p.m. and Ardha Jamam at 10:00 p.m. Each ritual has three steps: alangaram (decoration), neivethanam (food offering) and deepa aradanai (waving of lamps) for both Srinivasan and Shenbagavalli. During the last step of worship, nagaswaram (pipe instrument) and tavil (percussion instrument) are played, religious instructions in the Vedas (sacred text) are recited by priests, and worshippers prostrate themselves in front of the temple mast. There are weekly, monthly and fortnightly rituals performed in the temple. Pavitrotsavam is a festival organised in the temple by Karimaran Kalai Kappagam of Triplicane, Chennai, every July. The festive images of the deity are taken out in procession and special poojas are performed during the occasion. Akshaya Tritiya is another major festival celebrated in the temple when the festival deity is taken in procession in a Garuda mount around the temple.

== Religious significance ==
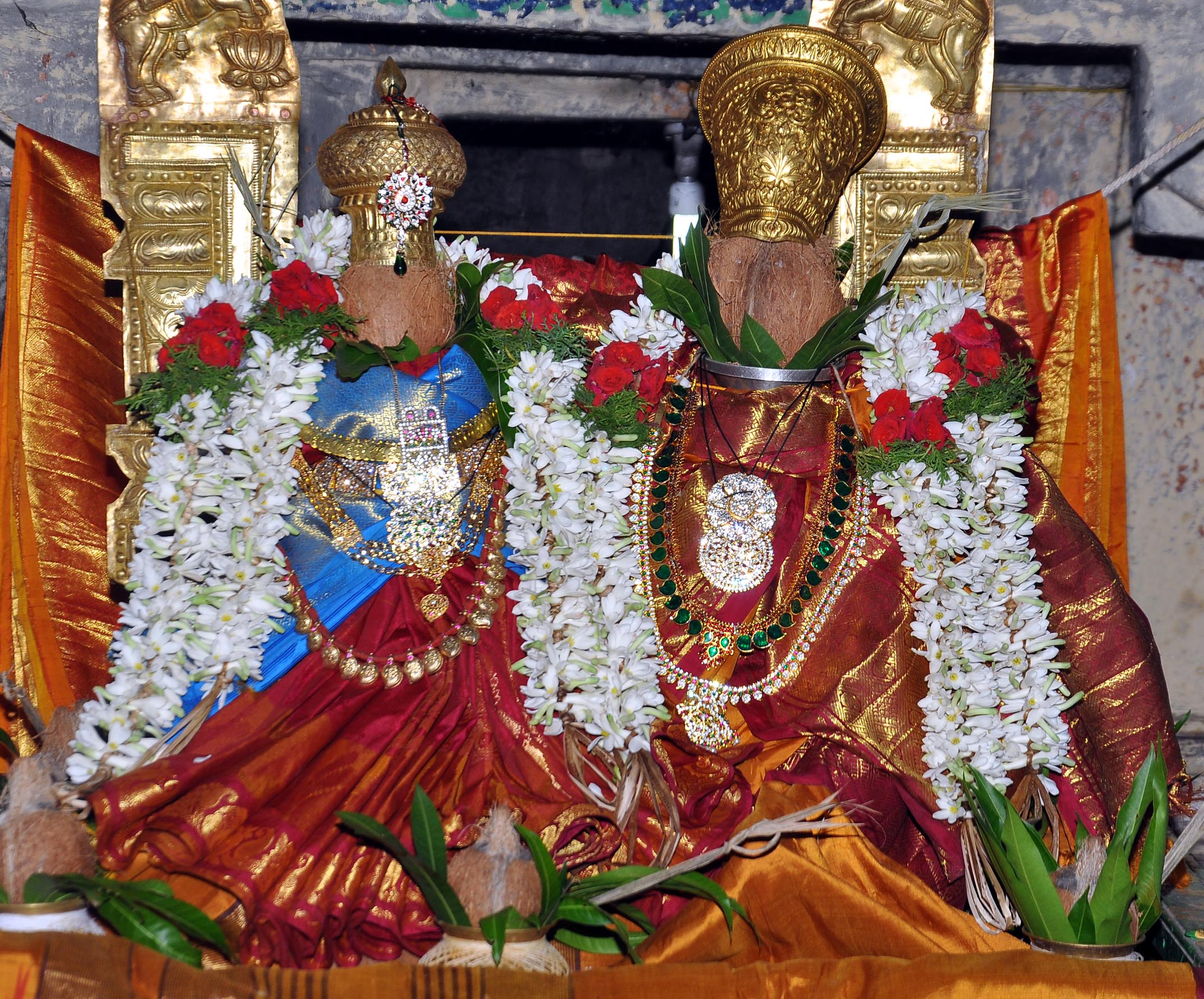
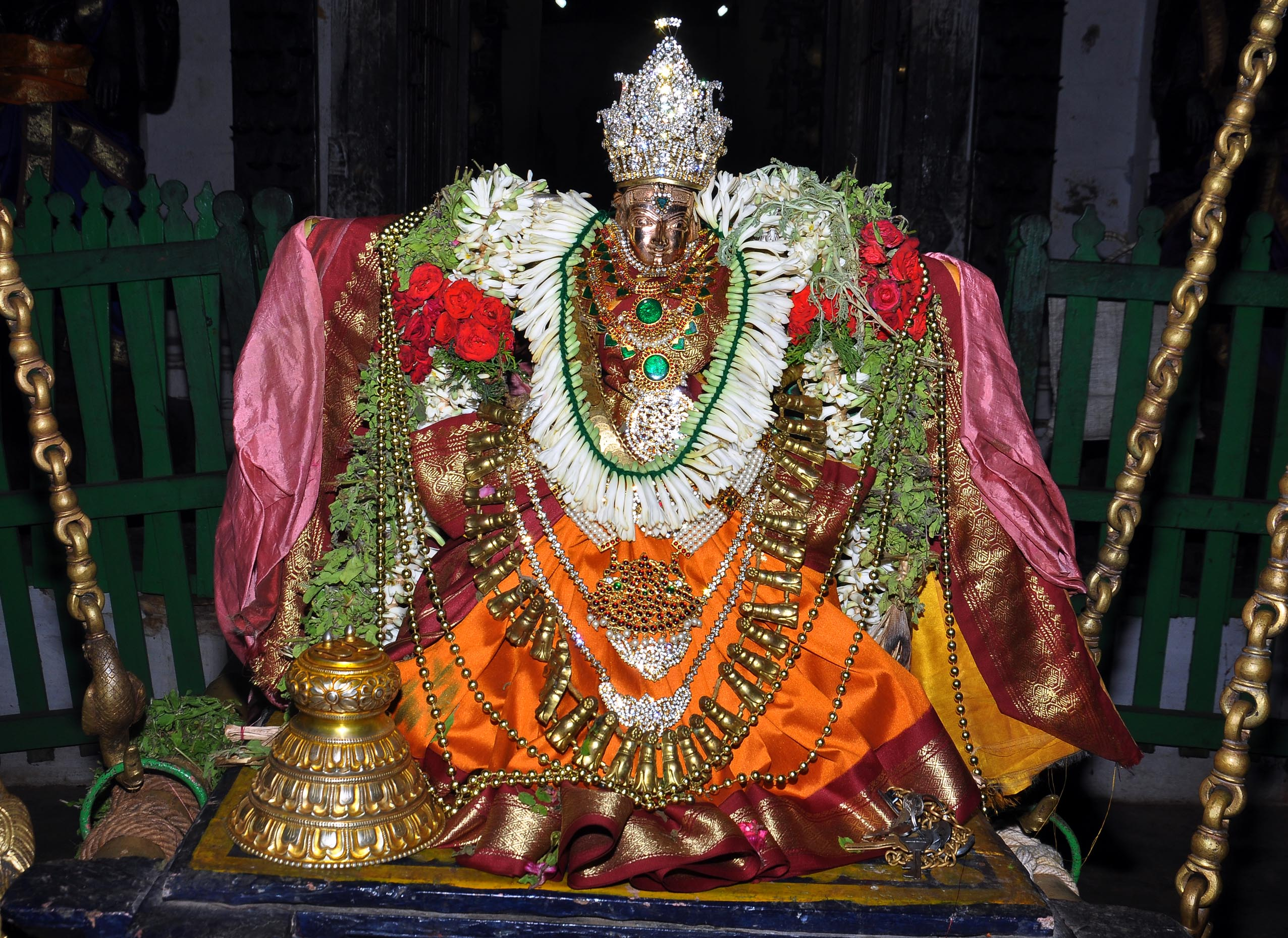
Festival images

The temple is revered in Nalayira Divya Prabandham, the 7th–9th century Vaishnava canon, by Thirumangai Alvar in eleven hymns. The temple is classified as a Divya Desam, one of the 108 Vishnu temples that are mentioned in the book. Thirumangai Alvar eulogised the presiding deity in ten verses classified between 1438-47. The temple is a symbol of unity between the two sects of Hinduism, namely, Vaishnavism and Shaivism and Nandi the sacred bull Shiva and image of Brahma are depicted in the main sanctum. The temple is frequented by people seeking timely wedding, reunion of married couples, children, court verdicts and cure from neural issues. The temple is also called Sundara Chola Vinnagaram on account of the contributions made by the Chola king Sundara Chola (957–970 CE). It is also believed that king Sibi worshiped Vishnu at this place. It is also believed that the Pallava king Nandivarman II (also called Pallava Malla), a contemporary of Thirumangai Alvar, was an ardent devotee of the temple.
