= Darasuram =

Darasuram Dharasuram
- Suburban
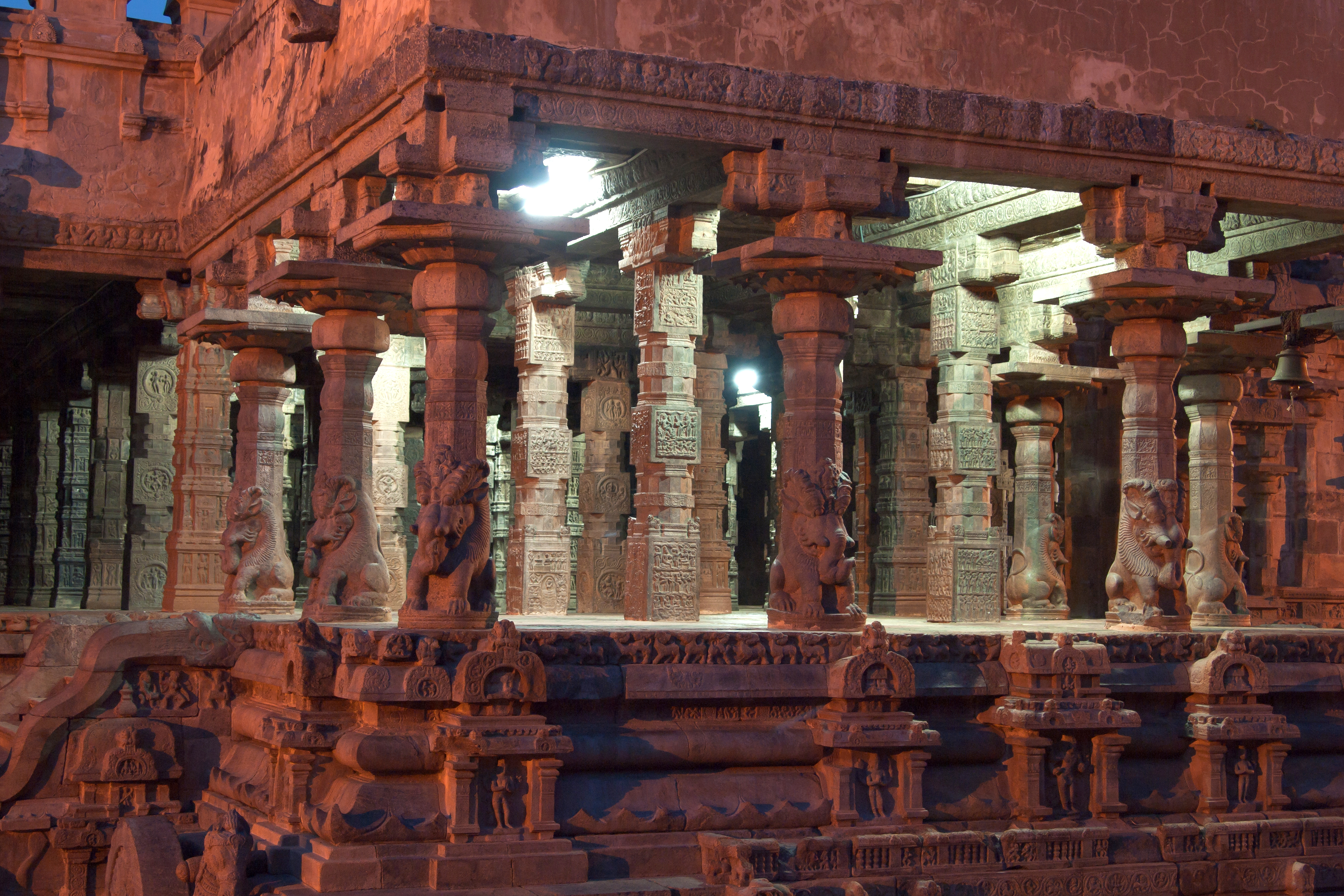
- Airavateshwarar Temple, Kumbakonam

- Location in Tamil Nadu, India Darasuram (India)
- Coordinates: 10.951483°N 79.356222°E
- Country: India
- State: Tamil Nadu
- District: Thanjavur

Population (2001)
  - Total: 13,027

Languages
  - Official: Tamil
- Time zone: UTC+5:30 (IST)

Darasuram or Dharasuram is a neighbourhood in the city of Kumbakonam, Tamil Nadu, India. The area is known for the Airavateswara temple constructed by the Rajaraja Chola II in the 12th century CE. The temple is a recognised UNESCO World Heritage monument.

== Demographics ==
As of 2001 India census, Darasuram had a population of 13,027. Males constitute 50% of the population and females 50%. Dharasuram has an average literacy rate of 70%, higher than the national average of 59.5%: male literacy is 77% and, female literacy is 63%. In Dharasuram, 11% of the population is under six years of age.

== Airavatesvara temple ==
This temple is a storehouse of art and architecture. The vimana is 85 feet high. The front mandapam itself is in the form of a huge chariot drawn by horses. The temple has some exquisite stone carvings.

The main deity's consort Periya Nayaki Amman temple is situated adjacent to Airavateshwarar temple.

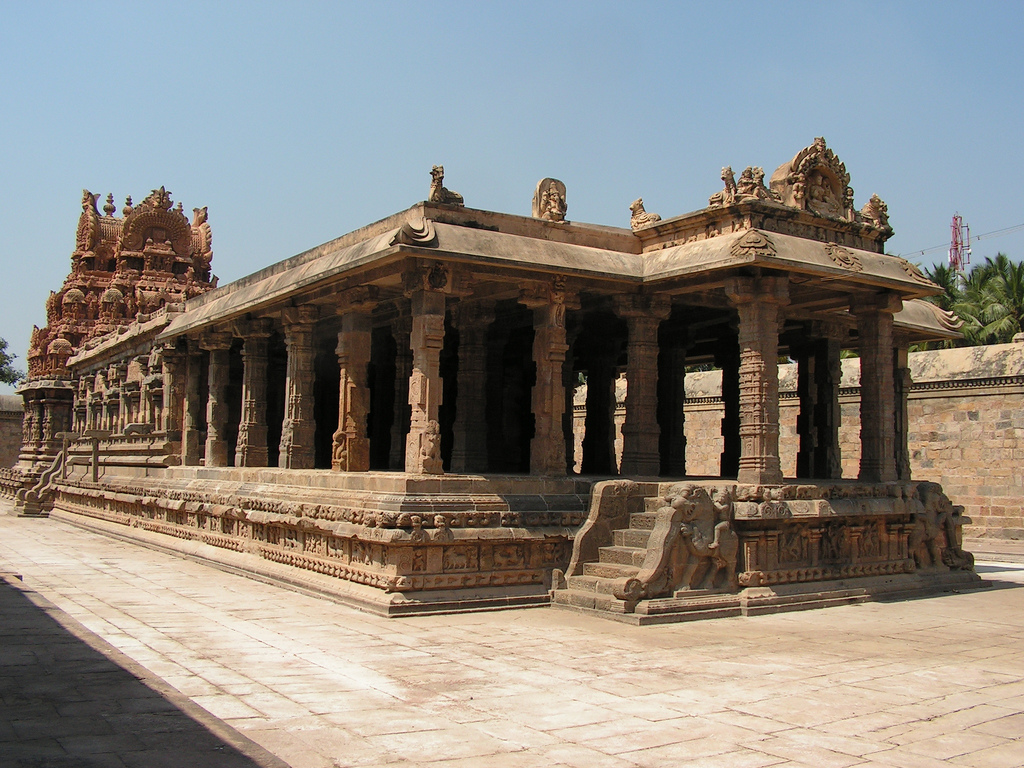
Periya Nayaki Amman temple

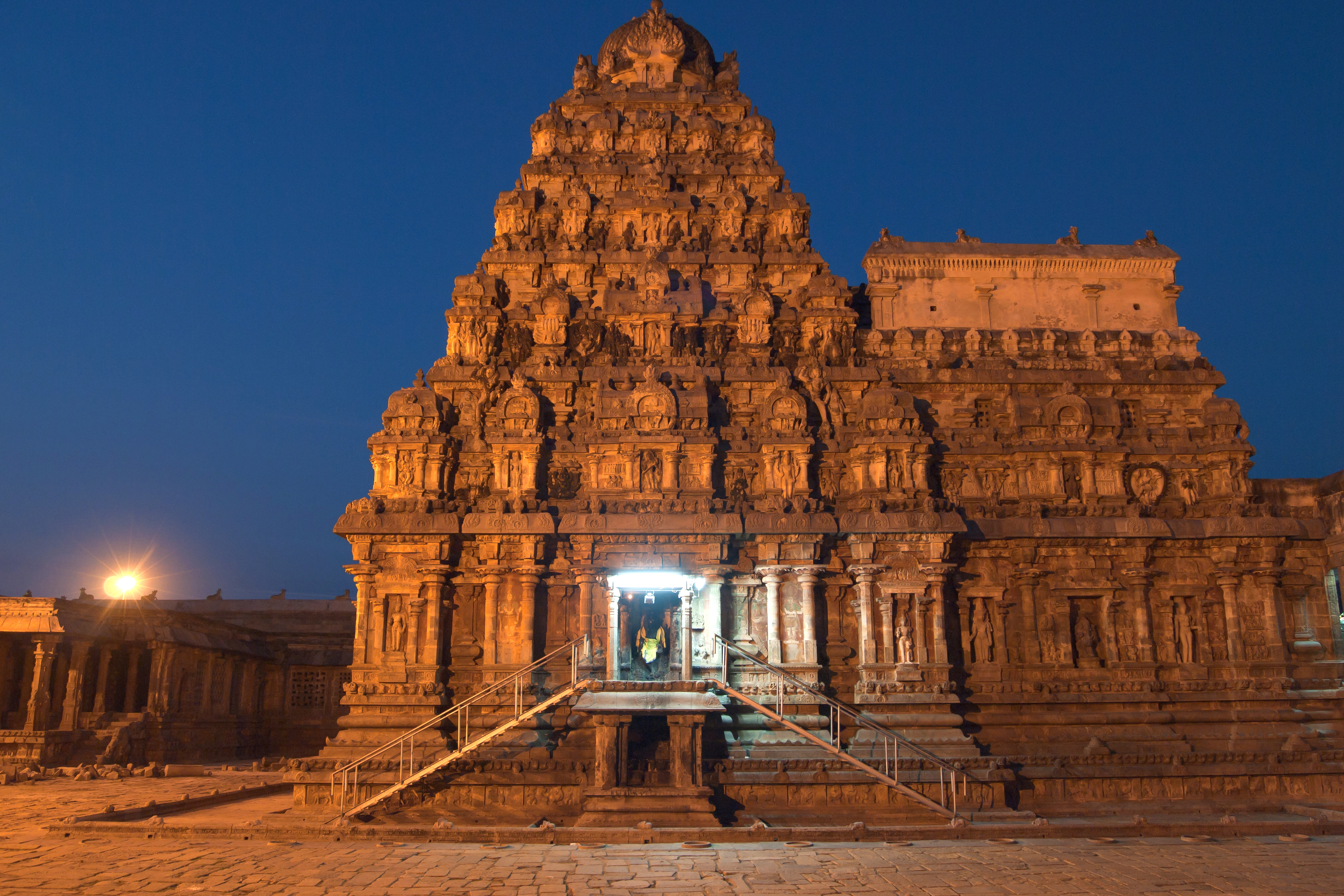
Airavateshwarar temple gopuram

The Great Living Chola Temples. (a UNESCO World Heritage Site) at Thanjavur, Gangaikonda Cholapuram and Kumbakonam were built by the Cholas between the 10th and 12th centuries CE and have a lot of similarities.

=== Legend ===
According to regional legend, Airavata, the white elephant of Indra, worshipped Shiva in this temple; so did also the god of death, Yama. Tradition has it that the presiding deity Airavatesvarar cured Yama himself who was suffering under a sage's curse from a burning sensation all over the body. Yama took a bath in the sacred tank and was rid of the burning sensation. Since then the tank is known as Yamateertham. It gets its supply of fresh water from the river Kaveri and is 228 feet in width. Pilgrims make a point to bathe in the tank. In the recent past Raja Raja Chola worshipped the lingam in this temple. Volume II of the South Indian Temple Inscriptions deals with a number of endowments of the Pandya Kings also (see pages 556 to 562). On the temple walls these inscriptions are given, from which it is seen that the temple was known in those days as Raja Rajeswararen and Raja Rajapuram. Two such inscriptions are copied here.

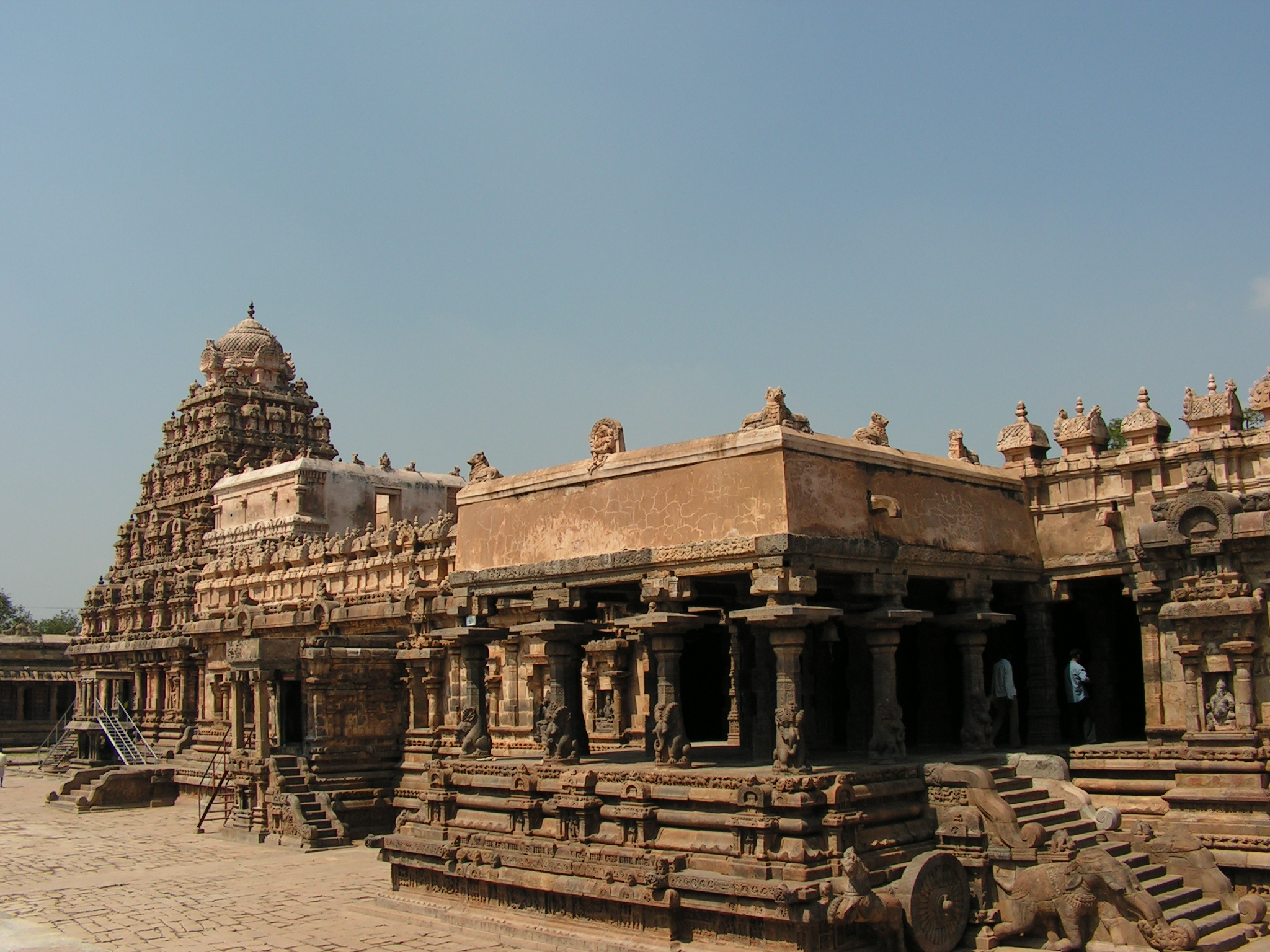
Airavateshwarar temple

Inscription No. 563 at page 557. No. 23 of 1908 on the inner Gopura of the temple, right of entrance. Record dated in the 10th Year, Tai 11, of the reign of the Pandya King Maravarman alias Tribhuvana Chakravartin Srivallabhadeva registering the provision made for repairs and for celebrating festivals in the temple of XXXI Ra (ja) ra (ja) isuram Udaiyanayanar, by the residents of Uttattur-nadu, a sub-division of Kulottungasola-valanadu.

Inscription No. 564 at page 558. Record dated in the 31st Year, Makara, Ba. Dvitiya, Uttarashada (probably a mistake for Uttaraphalguna) of the reign of the Chola king Tribhuvana Ghakravartin Sri Rajarajadeva registering the grant of land (Irandu Ma mukkani araikkani) 23/160 of a veli to meet the expenses of worship, offerings, etc., to the God by a native of Peruchchalipuram, a village in Kilar-kurram, a sub-division of Pandyakulapati-valanadu.

The goddess in this temple is known as Deva Nayaki. Whatever remains of the sculptural part of the temple is on the inside wall of the outer prakaram (outer courtyard), about a foot from floor level. 'The carvings contain different poses of gymnastic feats seen in the modern circus, shown by females keeping their head at the centre and legs interwoven in such a skillful way as to form the circumference of a circle. It may be a depiction of the present-day gypsy tribe entertaining villagers with gymnastic shows and dancing poses. Such gypsies are still to be seen visiting the interior villages of the country. Many styles of physical feats shown by both men and women have been carved in the stone.

=== Architecture ===
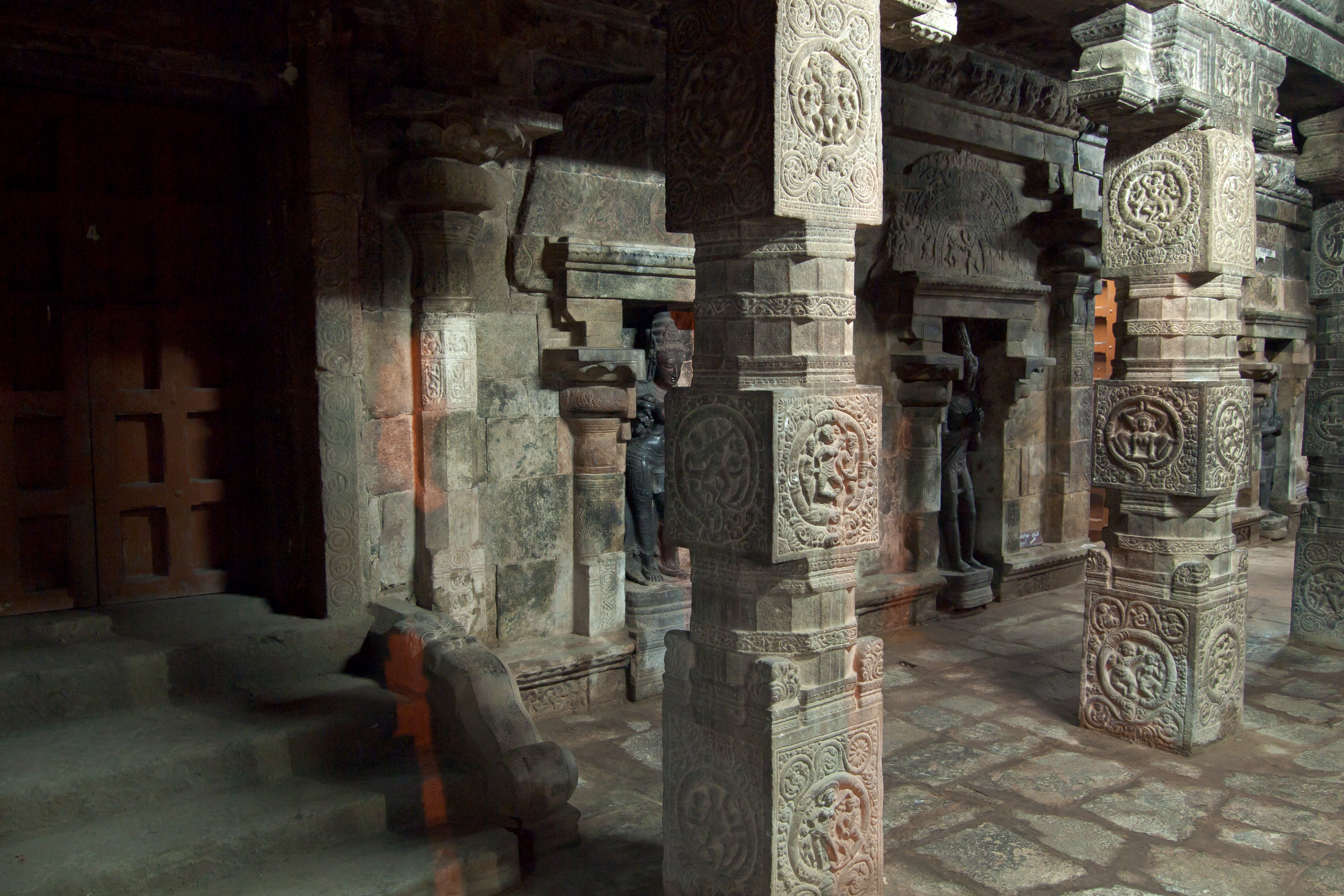
With heavily ornamented pillars accurate in detail and richly sculpted walls, the Airavateswara temple at Darasuram is a classic example of Chola art and architecture

The main mantapa is called Raja Gambira as the elephant draws the chariot. The wheels were put back by the ASI at a later date. The ceiling has a beautiful carving of Shiva and Parvathi inside an open lotus.

All the dancing poses of Bharatanatyam are carved in the stone. They are referred to as the Sodasa Upasaras. There is a carving showing the village womenfolk helping in the delivery of another female, who has both her hands on the shoulders of the two ladies, who are pressing their hands and the abdomen of the lady to help her deliver. There are also sculptures of Buddha, Bhikshatana, Saraswathi without her Veena, and a sculpture of Ardhanarishvara, Brahma and Surya.

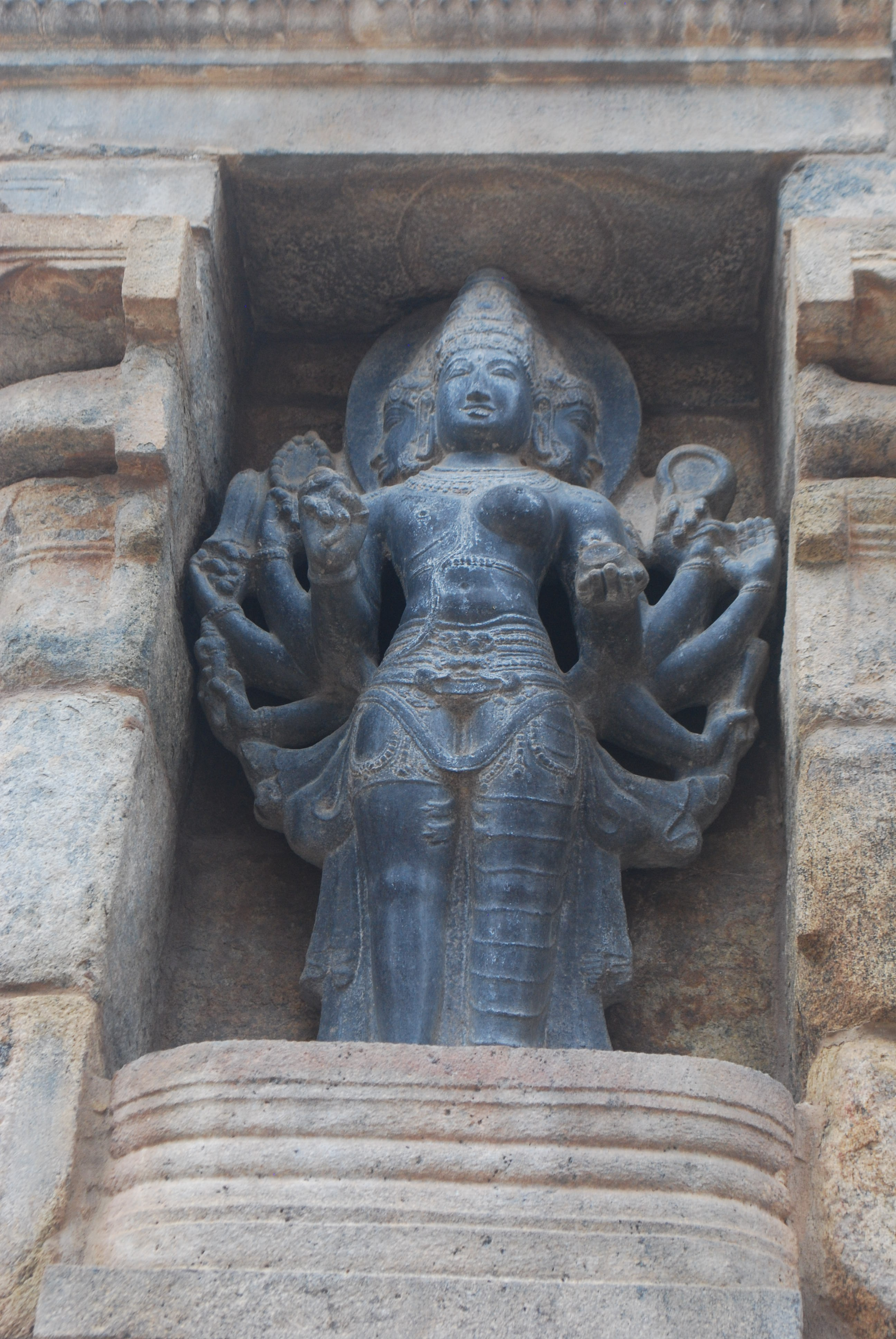
Ardhanarishvara statue at Darasuram

The paintings on the walls have been repainted during the Nayak periods.

At the very entrance to the temple two Dwarapalakas, Sankhanidhi and Padmanidhi, are imposing figures, giving vivid anatomical expressions of the exuberance of youth. In front of the temple, there is a small mandapa, which can be reached by three steps in the form of a ladder. The steps are stones, which give different musical sounds when tapped. All the seven swaras can be had at different points. It is feared that if proper care is not taken soon, village children will damage the stones. Now these stone steps have been completely covered with metal grills to save them from deterioration. Meanwhile, Archeology department has taken many steps to prevent this monument from public viewers and local villagers.

== Inundation ==
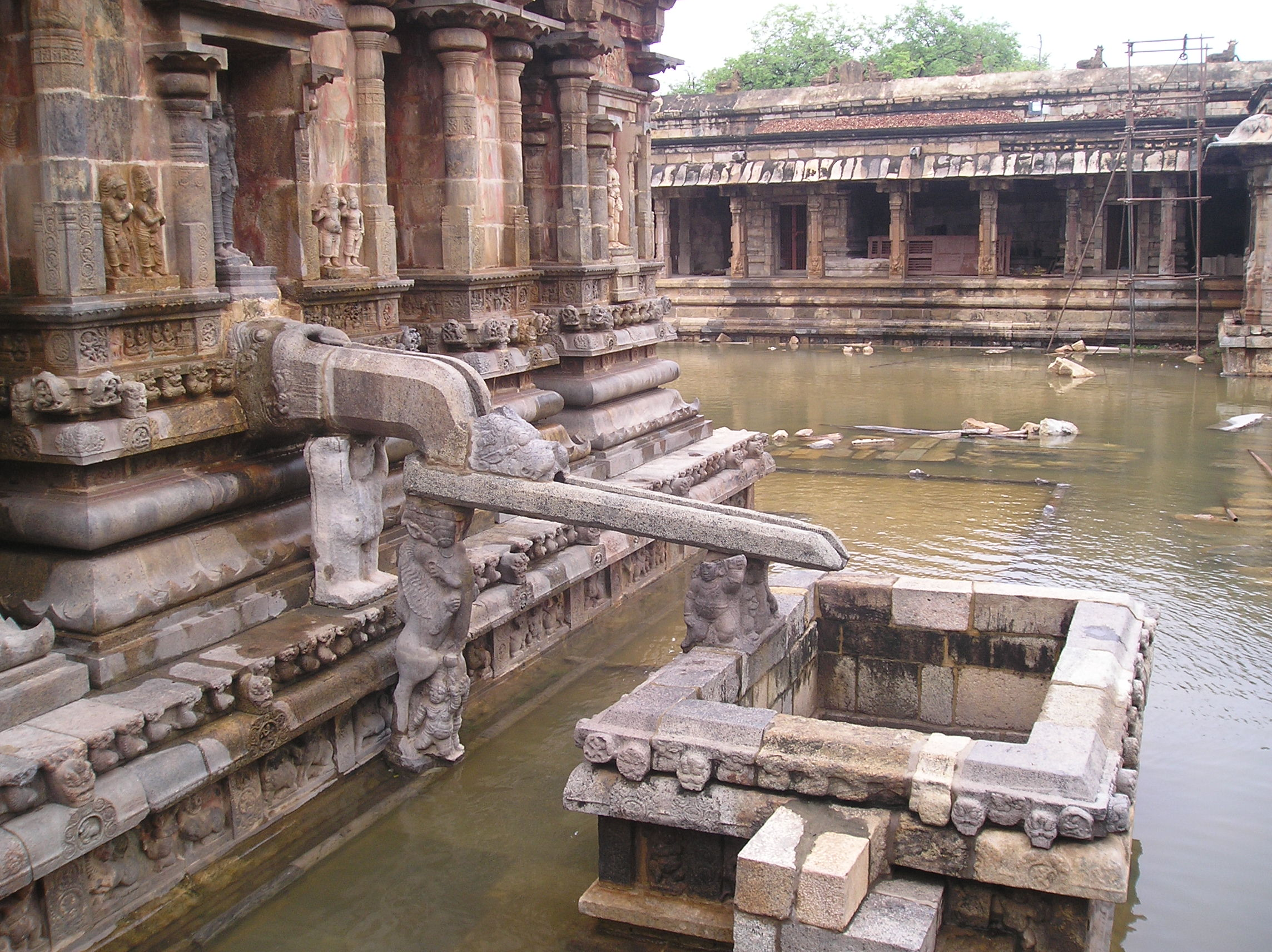
Inundated Temple

Airavateswara Temple faces problems of inundation after every downpour. Unimaginative municipal planning has resulted in the temple being at a lower elevation than the surrounding roads. This results in inundation during rains.
