= Kudamurutti River =

River in India

The Kudamurutti River, a tributary of the Kaveri, is in Thiruvaiyaru in the Thanjavur District of the southeastern Indian state of Tamil Nadu.
