= Thirubuvanam silk sari =

Textiles from Tamil Nadu, India

- Geographical indication
- Description: Silk sari from Thirubuvanam region
- Type: Handicraft
- Area: Thirubuvanam, Thanjavur district, Tamil Nadu
- Country: India
- Registered: 2018–19
- Material: Silk

A Thirubuvanam silk sari is a silk sari woven in the Thirubuvanam region in Thanjavur district of the Indian state of Tamil Nadu. It was declared as a Geographical indication in 2018–19.

== Description ==
It includes a silk sari woven in the Thirubuvanam region on the highway of Kumbakonam to Mayiladuthurai in Tamil Nadu. The silk saris measure about 12 ft (3.7 m) in length and 4 ft (1.2 m) in breadth, weighing about 400 g (14 oz) without the zari. The saris are known for its extensive border and pallu designs with extensive zari work and higher thread count. The weavers are part of a co-operative named Thirubuvanam Silk Handloom Weavers Co-operative Production and Sale Society Limited (THICO), which was established in 1955.

== See also ==
- Koorai silk sari
