= Mayiladuthurai new bus station =

Bus station in Tamil Nadu, India

Mayiladuthurai new bus station Mayilāduthurai Puthiya Pēruntu Nilaiyam

General information
- Other names: Perunthalaivar Kamarajar New Bus Station
- Location: Manakkudi, Mayiladuthurai – 609001, Tamil Nadu, India.
- Coordinates: 11°6′39.93″N 79°40′26.38″E
- System: Local and Mofussil Bus Station
- Owner: Mayiladuthurai Municipality
- Operator: Tamil Nadu State Transport Corporation Ltd.
- Platforms: 3 (28 bays)
- Connections: Taxi Stand and Auto Rickshaw Stand

Construction
- Structure type: At-grade
- Parking: Available
- Accessible: Yes

Other information
- Status: Functioning
- Fare zone: Tamil Nadu State Transport Corporation (Kumbakonam) Ltd.

History
- Opened: 14 March 2026; 6 months ago
Location

Mayiladuthurai New Bus Station, officially known as Kamarajar New Bus Station, is a bus terminus, serving the town of Mayiladuthurai, Tamil Nadu, India. The station is named after K. Kamarajar, a former chief minister of Tamil Nadu , who was popularly called Karmaveerar (Great leader). It is located on State Highway 22 (SH-22), which connects Mayiladuthurai to Poompuhar, in the village of Manakkudi.

The bus stand is situated approximately 3.5 km (2.2 mi) from the Mayiladuthurai old bus stand, 6 km (3.7 mi)from Mayiladuthurai Junction railway station, and about 140 km (87 mi) from Tiruchirappalli International Airport.

== Background ==
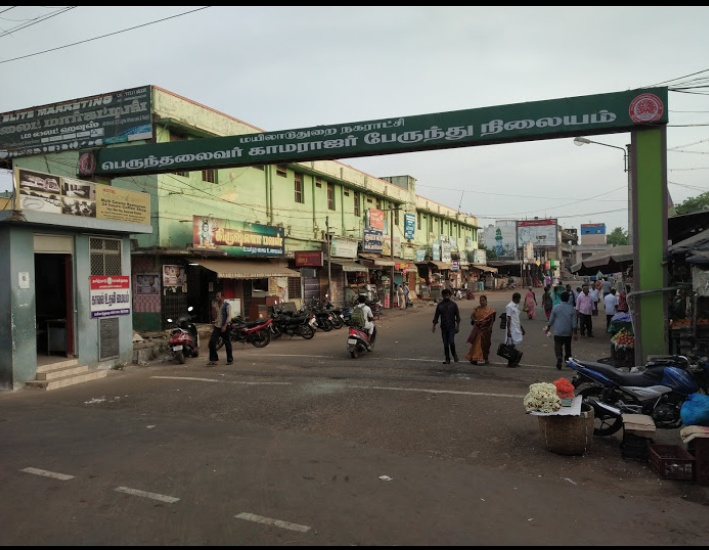
Mayiladuthurai Old Bus Station

The old bus stand in Mayiladuthurai is located on the Kumbakonam–Sirkazhi road. It is a Class-B bus stand, with 12 bus bays, and has been operational since 1963. To address increasing traffic and spatial limitations, a separate bus station was later opened adjacent to the old bus stand later 1995. This second terminus was designated to specifically handle services operating on the routes to Karaikal, Nagapattinam, and Thiruvarur, while the original bus stand continued to serve all other destinations across Tamil Nadu and other states, which handles more than 1000 trips a day. Consequently, the town is currently served by two principal bus stands. Until 2026, there were two principal bus stands in the town.

In January 2020, the Government of Tamil Nadu sanctioned the construction of new bus stand for mayiladuthurai at an estimated cost of ₹38.05 crore. The site for new facility was identified at Manakudi, located on SH-22 between Poompuhar to Kallanai, and situated adjacent to the proposed Mayiladuthurai bypass road. The site spanning 13.77 acres (5.57 ha) for the project was donated by the Dharamapuram Adheenam mutt to the municipality for the construction works.

The foundation stone for the new facility was laid on 7 December 2022. The project, proposed at cost of ₹24.00 crore, includes an over all build up area of 9,314 m^{2} (100,260 sq ft). The proposed amenities includes 28 bus bays, 49 shops, bus and rail booking counters, restaurants, TNSTC office, waiting hall, an ATM, a cloakroom, four public toilets (including two accessible for persons with disabilities), police booth, and a feeding room for women.

The new bus stand was opened by the Tamil Nadu Chief Minister M.K. Stalin on 14 March 2026 at final completion cost of ₹29.01 crore.

== Services ==
Mayiladuthurai located within Cauvery Delta region, the bus terminus is situated adjacent to East Coast Road also known as National Highway 32 (NH-32). The buses operating on the routes to Chennai from Velankanni, Nagapattinam, Karaikal, and Thiruvarur passes through the terminus. Additionally, a limited number of buses traveling to Chennai from Kumbakonam and Thanjavur also pass through the facility. There are also regular services to other South Indian cities such as Tuirucharapalli, Coimbatore, Madurai, Bengaluru, Tirupati and Pondicherry. Mayiladuthurai forms a part of the Tamil Nadu State Transport Corporation which is headquartered at Kumbakonam.

== See also ==
- Mayiladuthurai Junction
- Transport in Tamil Nadu
