= S. R. D. Vaidyanathan =

SRD Vaidyanathan
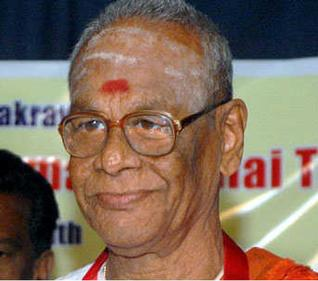

Background information
- Born: 15 March 1929
- Origin: Mayiladuthurai, Tamil Nadu, India
- Died: 18 November 2013 (aged 84)
- Genre: Carnatic music

SRD Vaidyanathan (Tamil: SRD.வைத்தியநாதன்; 15 March 1929 − 18 November 2013) was an Indian musician who played the Nadaswaram.

== Early life and background ==
S. R. D. Vaidyanathan was born in Mayiladuthurai, Tamil Nadu, India. He belonged to a popular musician family of Semponar koil. His grandfather Ramasamy Pillai’s Nagaswaram performance was recorded by His Master’s Voice and his father Dakshina Murthy also made a record for the Colombia company.

He was trained by Thiru Mayavaram Ramiah Pillai and learnt vocal music from Thiru Vizhundur. A.K. Ganesa pillai and Madurai Mani Iyer.

== Career ==
He was appointed and recognized as Adheena Vidwan by Dharmapuram Adheenam, Thiruvaduthurai Adheenam and Thirupanandal Adheenam. He has also worked as Reader in Nagaswaram in Annamalai University (Chidambaram) and Retd. Reader in Nagawasram Tamil Isai Sangam, Raja Annamalai Mandram, Chennai.

He has performed in Singapore, Thailand, Sri-Lanka and other countries. Many concerts were relayed by All India Radio (AIR) stations and he was the top grade Vidwan list and acted as a member in Audio-visual Board of AIR. He has 60 years of experience in this profession. His special feature on RAKTHI MELAM encompasses intricacies of laya.

== Death ==
Vaidyanathan died on 18 November 2013 at the age of 84.

== Awards and titles ==
- 'Nadha Prathibimbam' by Sri.Shunmuganandha Sabha, New Delhi, 1957.
- 'Kalaimamani' award of Tamil Nadu Government in 1981 by Puratchi thalaivar Dr. M. G. Ramachandran
- 'Rajarathna' award of Muthamil Peravai in 1987 given by Dr. Kalaingar M. Karunanidhi
- 'Bharath Kalachar' awarded by Century Memorial Prize.
- TTK award by the Music academy, Chennai, 2004
- Director K. Subramaniam Birth centenary award for excellence was presented by Sri Ram Mohan Rao. His excellency Governor of Tamil Nadu on 10 September 2004.
- 'Kala Rathan' award given by Rasika Ranjani Sabha, Mylapore, Chennai in 2004 at the Music Festival.
- 'Sangeetha Choodamani' award given by Krishna Gana sabha, Chennai 2006
- 'Natha Kalamani' award given by T.P.S Trust Naratha Gana sabha, 2006
- 'Sangeet Natak Academy' award (PURASKAR) given by Srimathi Pratibha Patil, President of India at a special ceremony at the Rastrapathi Bhawan with a citation and pursue money on 2008 for my contribution in the field of Carnatic Instrumental music Nagaswaram.
- Dr. A. P. J. Abdul Kalam former President of India presented the cash award and citation under the auspious of Narada Gana Sabha Chennai on 2008 for the Nagaswaram exponent.
- Anbu Palam Sadaniyar Sangama Independence Day Diamond Jubilee committee presented a Gold medal, citation etc. for the Nagaswaram Instrumental Music on 2008 at the University Centenary Hall, Chennai by Thiyagi Gurusamy Naidu(100) on octogenarian and freedom fighter.
- 'Isai Perarunjar' award given by the Tamil Isai Sangam at Raja Annamalai Mandram, Chennai on the occasion of their 66th Annual Music conference held on 2008.

== Special performances ==
- He has given a special performance in the Presence of President Dr.Radhakrishanan at The Rastrapathy Bhavan, New Delhi.
- He has performed RAKTHI MELAM in the presence of many Vidwans at Raja Annamalai Hall and awarded cash prize.
- A demonstration of Avadhana Pallavi was rendered with the accomplishment of Violin and Mugansingh using two typed of Tala at the same time. This was done at Doordarshan Kendra.
- Again demonstration was performed using two legs and two hands for tala and playing Nagaswaram, at the same time Pallavi swaram and Ragamaliga was performed.
- Rakthi Melam is his traditional specialty, inheritable property and we preserve this for the past five generations.
