= Koranad =

Coordinates: 11°06′N 79°38′E

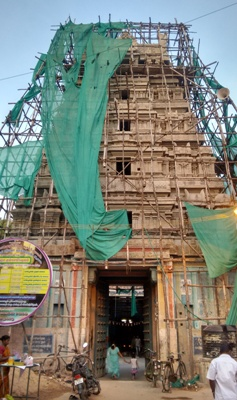
Koorainadu Punukeeswarar Temple

Koranad (formerly known as Koorainadu ) is an affluent commercial and residential neighbourhood in Mayiladuthurai, Tamil Nadu, India. It is surrounded by Kamarajar colony in the North, Dharmapuram in the East, Srinivasapuram in the South, and Sithkarkadu and Sholampettai in the West.

== Etymology ==
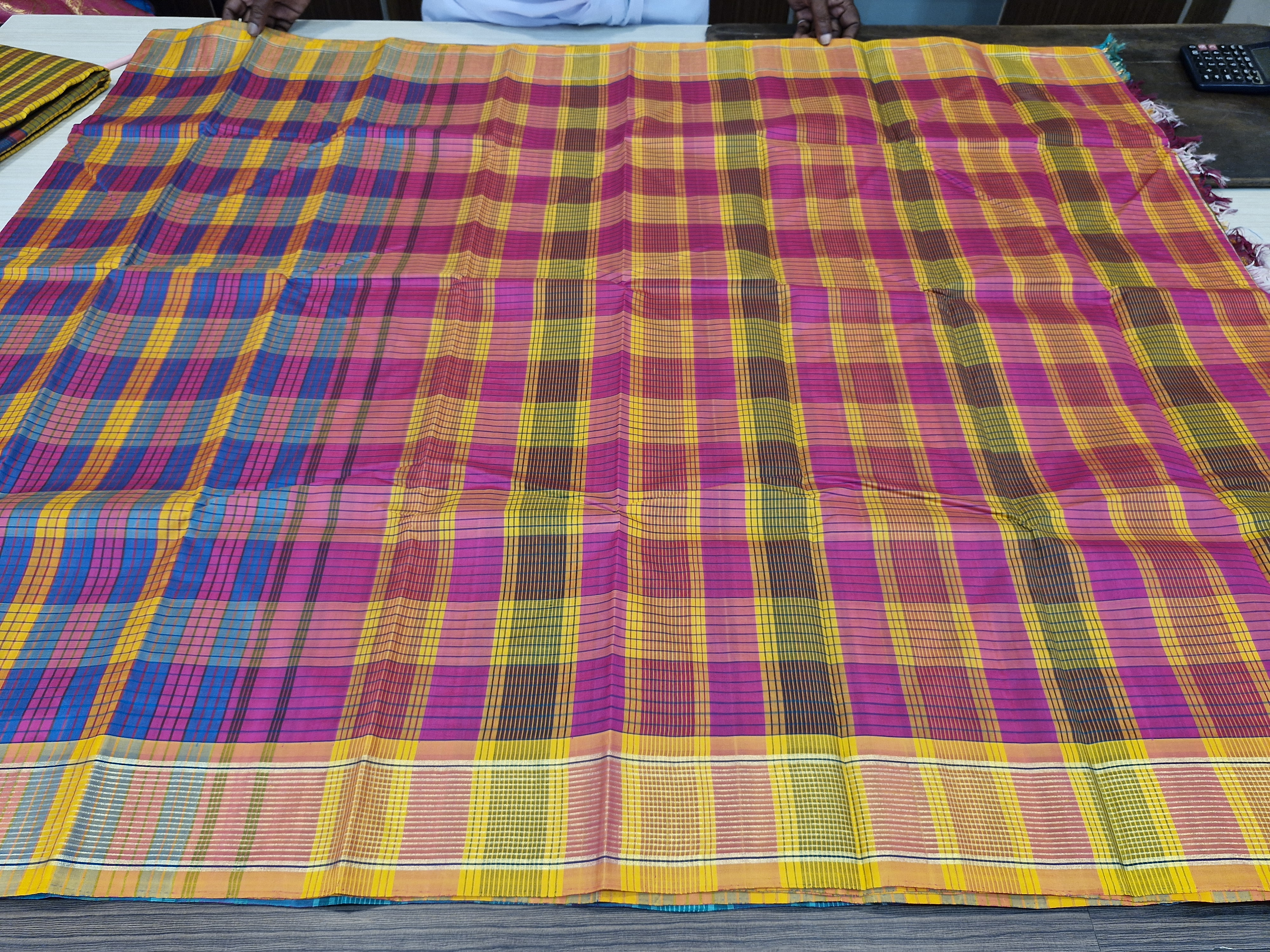
Traditional Koorai sari from Koranad, Mayiladuthurai, used in Tamil Hindu wedding ceremonies.

The name Koranad is derived from the older term Koorai-nadu. Historically, this locality in Mayiladuthurai, Tamil Nadu, was known for the production of koorai silk sarees, a traditional silk-cotton blend sarees typically worn by brides during Hindu weddings. The prominence of this textile craft led to the region being referred to as Koorai-nadu, meaning "land of koorai (sarees)". Over time, the name underwent phonetic changes and evolved into the modern form Korand.

The Punukeswarar Temple is located in Koranad.
