= Kanchipuram silk sari =

Type of silk saree made in Kanchipuram, Tamil Nadu, India

Kanchipuram silk
- Geographical indication
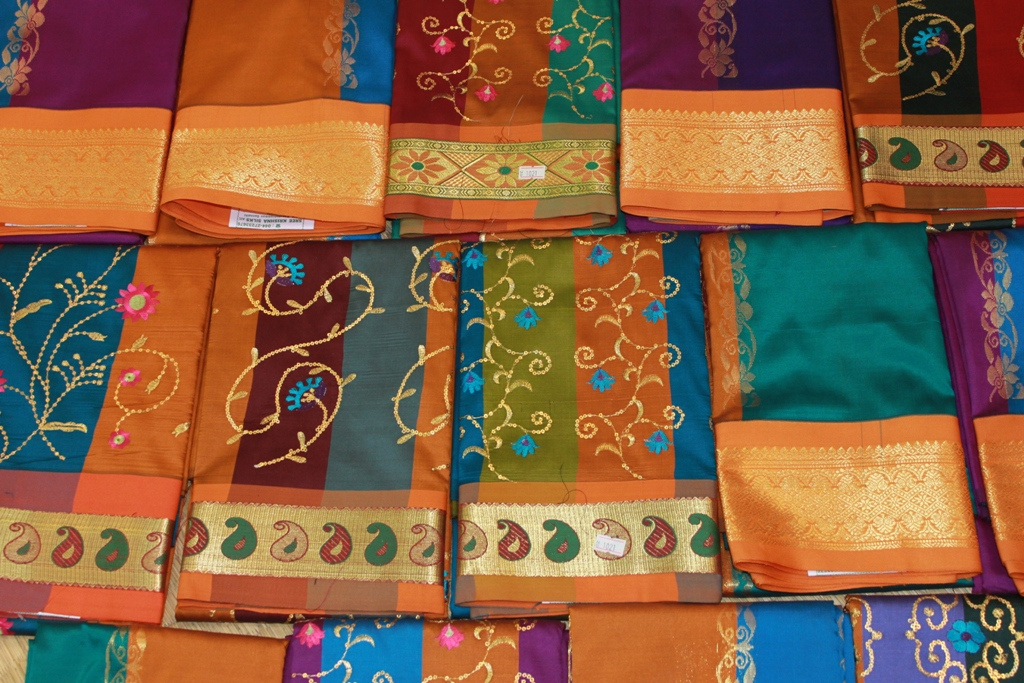
- A collection of Kanchipuram silk saris on display
- Description: Silk saris weaved in Kanchipuram
- Type: Handicraft
- Area: Kanchipuram, Tamil Nadu
- Country: India
- Registered: 2005–2006
- Material: Silk

The Kanchipuram silk sari, also called Kanjeevaram sari is a type of silk sari made in the Kanchipuram region in Tamil Nadu, India. These saris are worn as bridal & special occasion saris by most women in Tamil Nadu, Kerala, Karnataka & Andhra Pradesh. It has been recognized as a geographical indication by the Government of India in 2005–2006.

As of 2008, an estimated 5,000 families were involved in sari production. There are 25 silk and cotton yarn industries and 60 dyeing units in the region.

== Weaving ==
The saris are woven from pure mulberry silk thread. The pure mulberry silk and the Zari used in the making of Kanchipuram saris comes from South India. To weave a Kanchipuram sari three shuttles are used. While the weaver works on the right side, his aide works on the left side shuttle. The border colour and design are usually quite different from the body. If the mundhi (the hanging end of the sari) has to be woven in a different shade, it is first separately woven and then delicately joined to the Sari. The part where the body meets the mundhi is often denoted by a zigzag line. In a genuine Kanchipuram Silk Sari, body and border are woven separately and then interlocked together. The joint is woven so strongly that even if the saris tears, the border will not detach. That differentiates the kanchivaram silk saris from the others.

== Design ==
Saris are distinguished by their wide contrast borders. Temple borders, checks, stripes and floral (buttas) are traditional designs found on Kanchipuram saris. The patterns and designs in the Kanchipuram saris were inspired with images and scriptures in South Indian temples or natural features like leaves, birds and animals. These are saris with rich woven mundhi showing paintings of Raja Ravi Varma and epics of Mahabharata and Ramayana. Kanchipuram saris vary widely in cost depending upon the intricacy of work, colours, pattern, material used like zari (gold thread) etc. The silk is also known for its quality and craftsmanship, which has helped earn its name.

== Significance ==
Kanchipuram saris woven with heavy silk and gold cloth are considered to be special and are worn on occasions and festivities.

== Geographical Indication ==
In 2005, the Government of Tamil Nadu applied for Geographical Indication for Kanchipuram saris. The Government of India recognized it as a Geographical indication officially since the year 2005-06.

== In popular culture ==
The Tamil film Kanchivaram released in 2008 depicts the struggles of silk weavers in Kanchipuram.

== See also ==
- Mysore silk
- Koorai silk saree
- Ilkal sari
- Navalgund Durries
- Tissue (cloth)
