= Koorai silk sari =

Textile industry in Tamil Nadu and Silk in India

Coordinates: 11.101800°N 79.652600°E

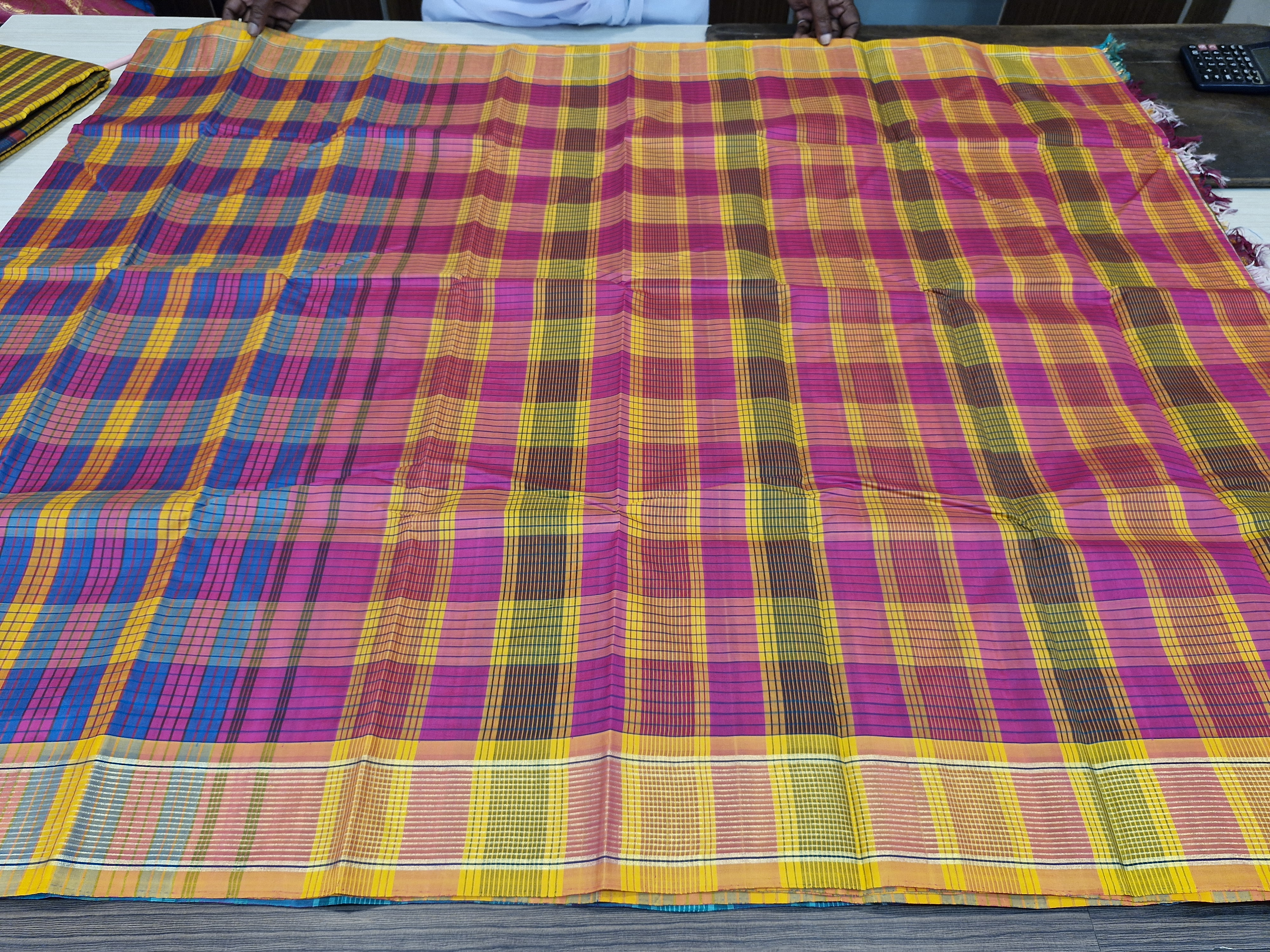
- A typical Koorai sari used in Tamil Hindu weddings
- Native name: கூரை பட்டு புடவை

Production area
- State: Tamil Nadu

Details
- Ingredients: Silk & cotton
- Length: 8.2 m (9 yd)
- Breadth: 1.22 m (1.33 yd)
- Colour: Purple, dark pink, and turmeric yellow
- Usage: Hindu wedding ceremonies
- Manufacturer: Tamil Nadu Handloom Weavers Co-operative Society, Koranad Mayiladuthurai

Status
- GI Status: Applied and under review

Koorai silk sari, also referred to as Koorai pattu pudavai, Koorai pattu, or Koranad cloth, is a traditional nine-yard sari originating from Koranad in Mayiladuthurai, Tamil Nadu, India. Traditionally worn by brides during Hindu wedding ceremonies, the sari is recognized for its unique weaving patterns and cultural significance. It is produced by the Sāliyan weaving community using a blend of silk and cotton, and is typically characterized by checked designs and vibrant colors such as green and yellow, which are traditionally associated with prosperity and fertility.

== History ==
The Koorai silk sari, originates from Koorai Naadu—present-day Koranad, a neighborhood in Mayiladuthurai, Tamil Nadu, India. The tradition is associated with Saint Nesa Nayanar, a Nayanar saint reputed for weaving garments for devotees of Lord Shiva, and the Sāliyan weaving community, who trace their lineage to Sāliya Mahā Rishi, according to the Sthalapurānam of the Nallādai temple. Believed to date back nearly 5,000 years, the sari was originally woven from cotton. By the early 20th century, it transitioned to silk and became a prominent bridal garment, particularly until the 1950s. Revival initiatives, such as those led by T. N. Venkatesh of Co-Optex in 2014, have aimed to sustain the craft amid a decline in the number of traditional weavers.

== Weaving and materials ==
Koorai silk sari is traditionally handwoven using pit looms, raised pit looms, or frame looms, with each sari requiring approximately 6 to 10 days to complete and involving an estimated 13,000 hand and leg movements. The loom setup itself typically takes up to a week. The sari is produced using pure silk and fine-twisted mercerized cotton yarn in a 2:1 ratio, resulting in a lightweight fabric with a silk-like texture. It is characterized by small checked patterns created through the interlacing of warp and weft threads, and includes a seer pallu (decorative end piece) often woven in contrasting colors. Synthetic dyes are used to produce vibrant shades such as green, yellow, maroon, and red, which are traditionally associated with cultural symbolism.

== Design and features ==
The sari measuring approximately nine yards in length and 1.33 yards in width, the sari is traditionally designed for the Madisar drape—a Tamil style in which the lower portion resembles a dhoti and the upper portion a sari. This draping style is culturally associated with the symbolic representation of the union of masculine and feminine energies. A distinguishing feature of the Koorai silk sari is its cotton checked pattern, which requires skilled weaving techniques and sets it apart from other regional saris. While traditional versions included double-sided pallus, contemporary designs more commonly feature a single-sided pallu in contrasting colors. Decorative motifs are typically inspired by elements of nature and marital customs, and color variations now include shades such as purple, dark pink, and turmeric yellow.

== Cultural significance ==
In Tamil Hindu weddings, the Koorai silk sari is traditionally worn during the muhūrtam—the auspicious moment when the mangalsutra is tied—an event believed to promote marital harmony. The sari's colours are culturally symbolic: green is associated with fertility and growth, while yellow represents prosperity. Variants with wide borders are often offered to temples as devotional offerings. Despite evolving fashion trends, the sari continues to be valued in certain communities as part of bridal attire, contributing to the preservation of Tamil Nadu's textile heritage.

== Decline and revival ==
The Koorai silk weaving industry has faced significant challenges, with the number of weavers dropping from thousands to an estimated 20–30 by the 2020s. Some reports suggest only five weavers remain in local cooperatives. Factors contributing to the decline include lack of awareness, reduced demand, and younger generations pursuing alternative careers. Revival initiatives focus on promotional campaigns, design innovations, and cooperative support, but the craft's survival depends on broader recognition and patronage. The economic viability of the craft remains precarious due to limited market reach and competition from modern textiles.

The Koorai silk weaving industry has experienced a significant decline, with the number of active weavers decreasing from several thousand to an estimated 20 to 30 by the 2020s. Some reports indicate that as few as five weavers remain within local cooperatives. Contributing factors include limited public awareness, declining demand, and a shift among younger generations toward alternative employment opportunities. Revival efforts have focused on promotional campaigns, design innovation, and cooperative-based support; however, the continued survival of the craft is considered dependent on wider recognition and sustained patronage. The economic viability of Koorai silk weaving remains uncertain due to restricted market access and competition from mass-produced textiles.

== Gallery ==
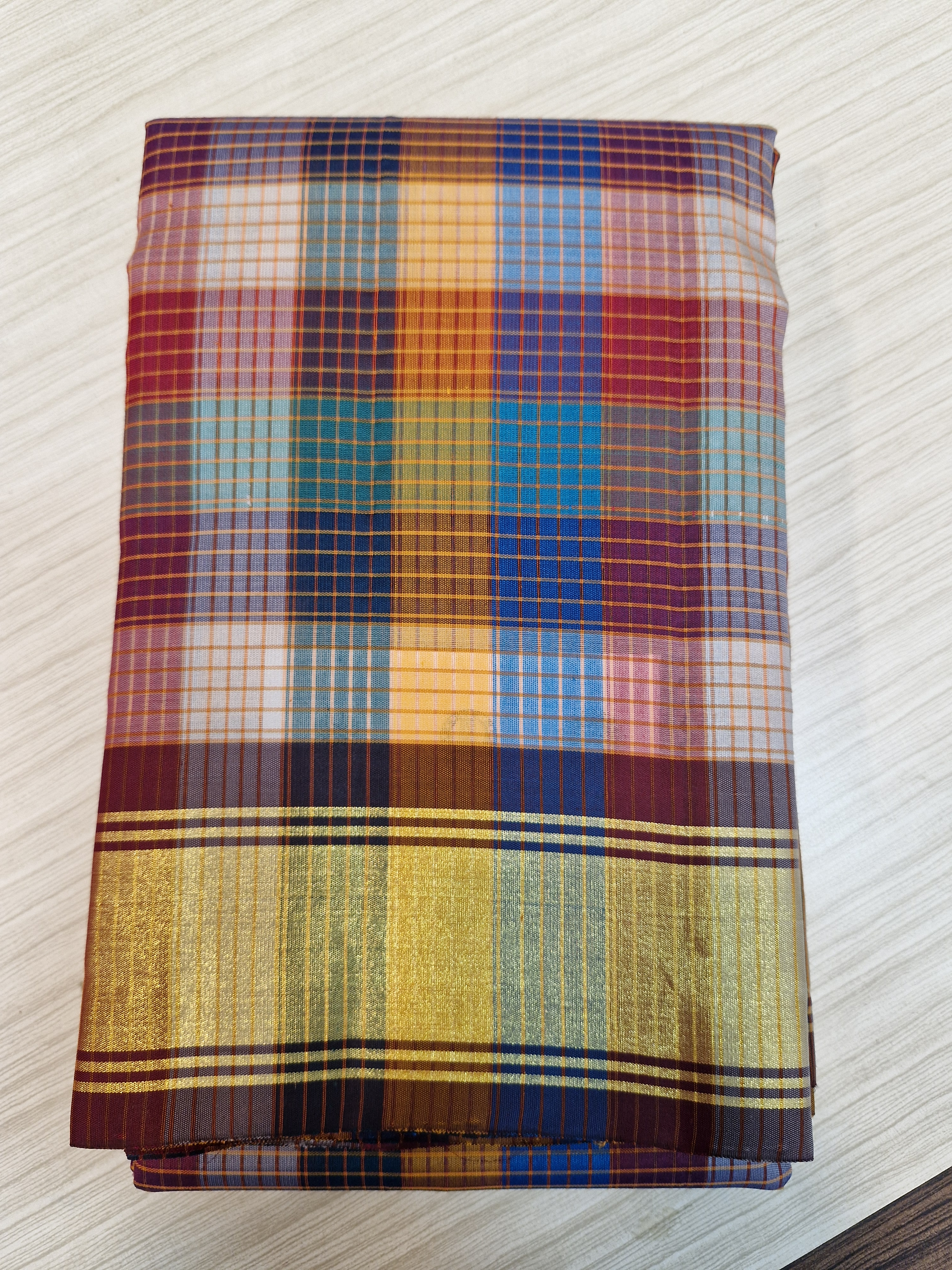
Koorai silk sari checked pattern

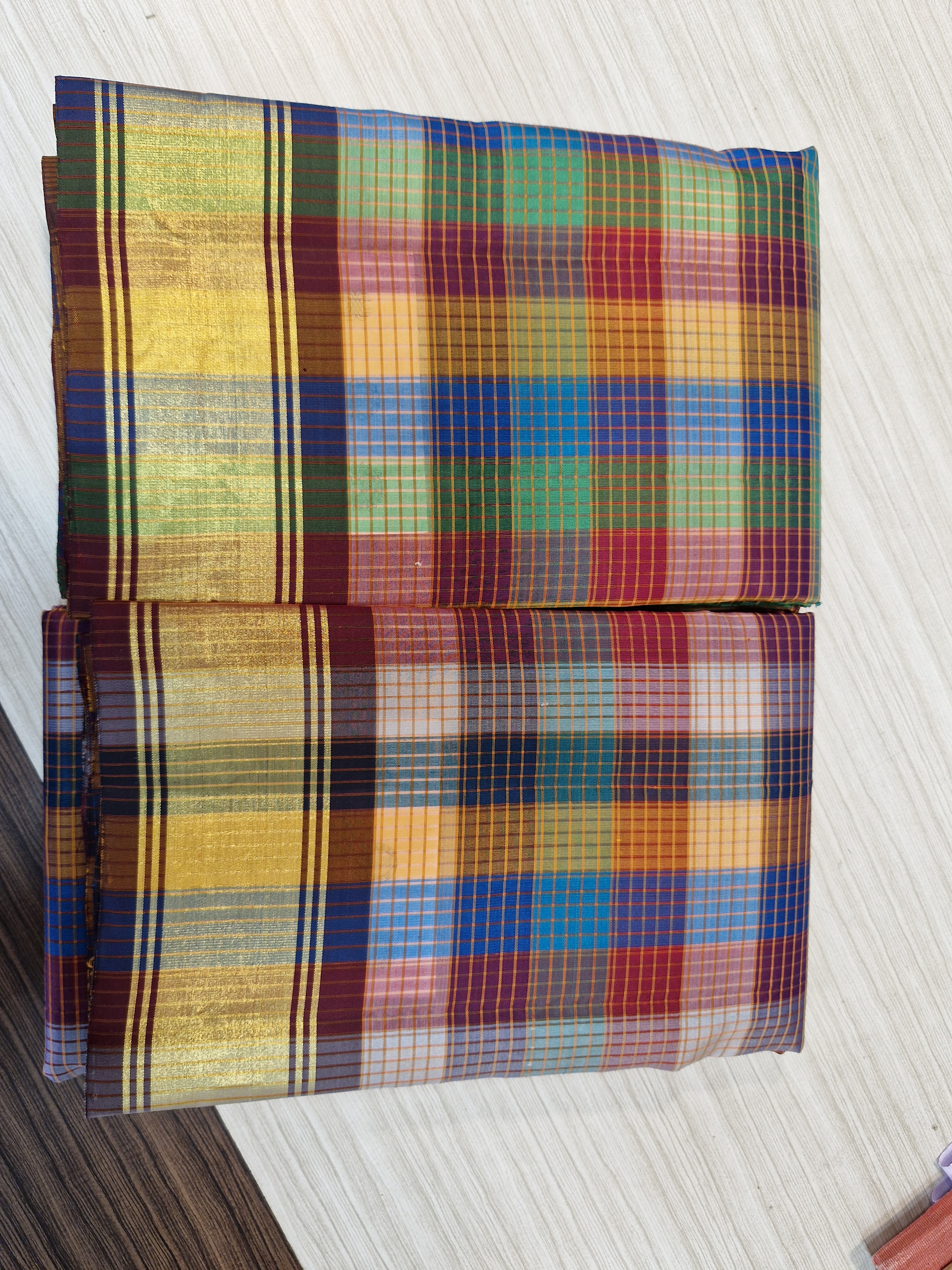
Koorai silk sari

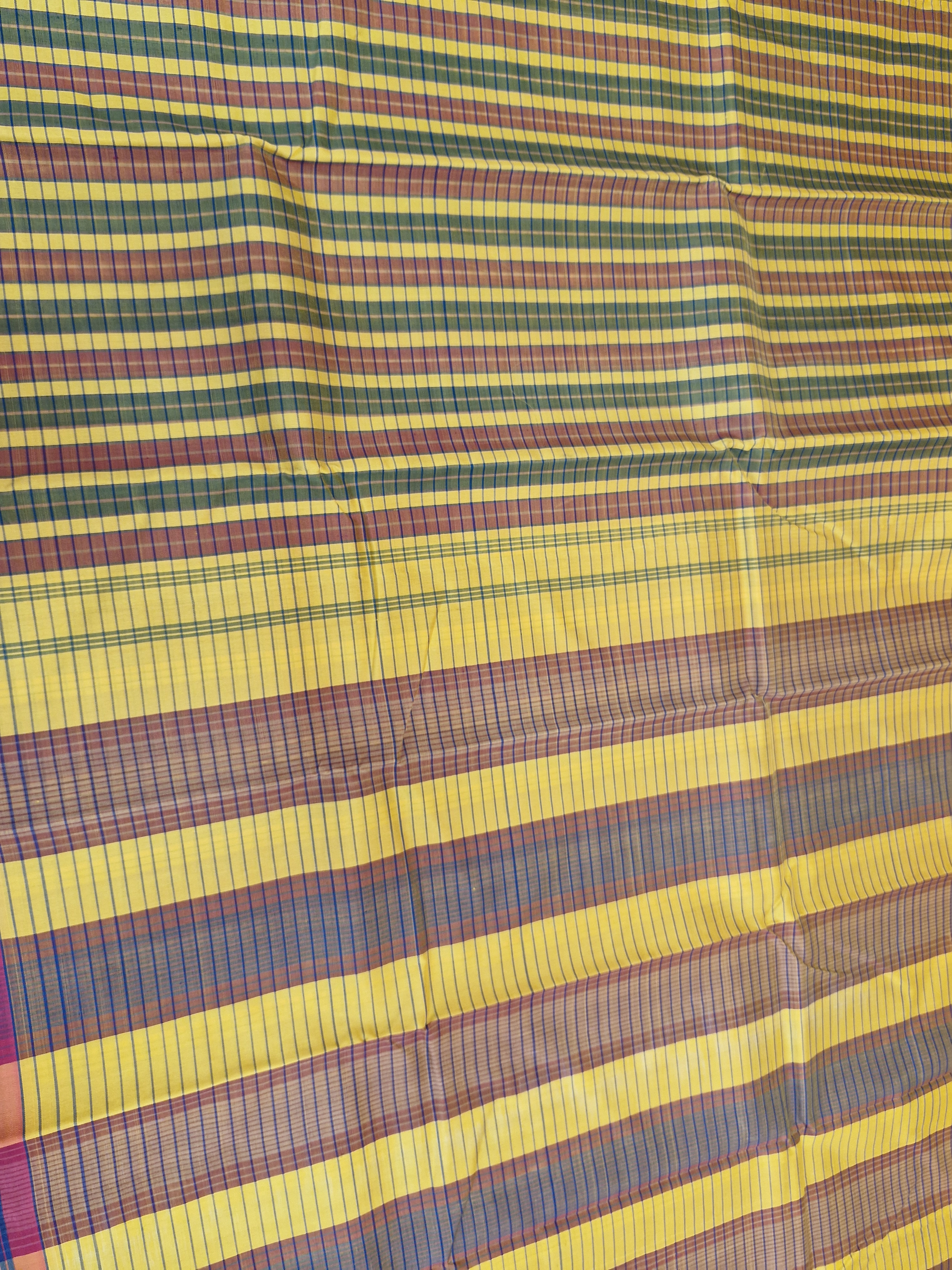
Koorai silk sari inside design

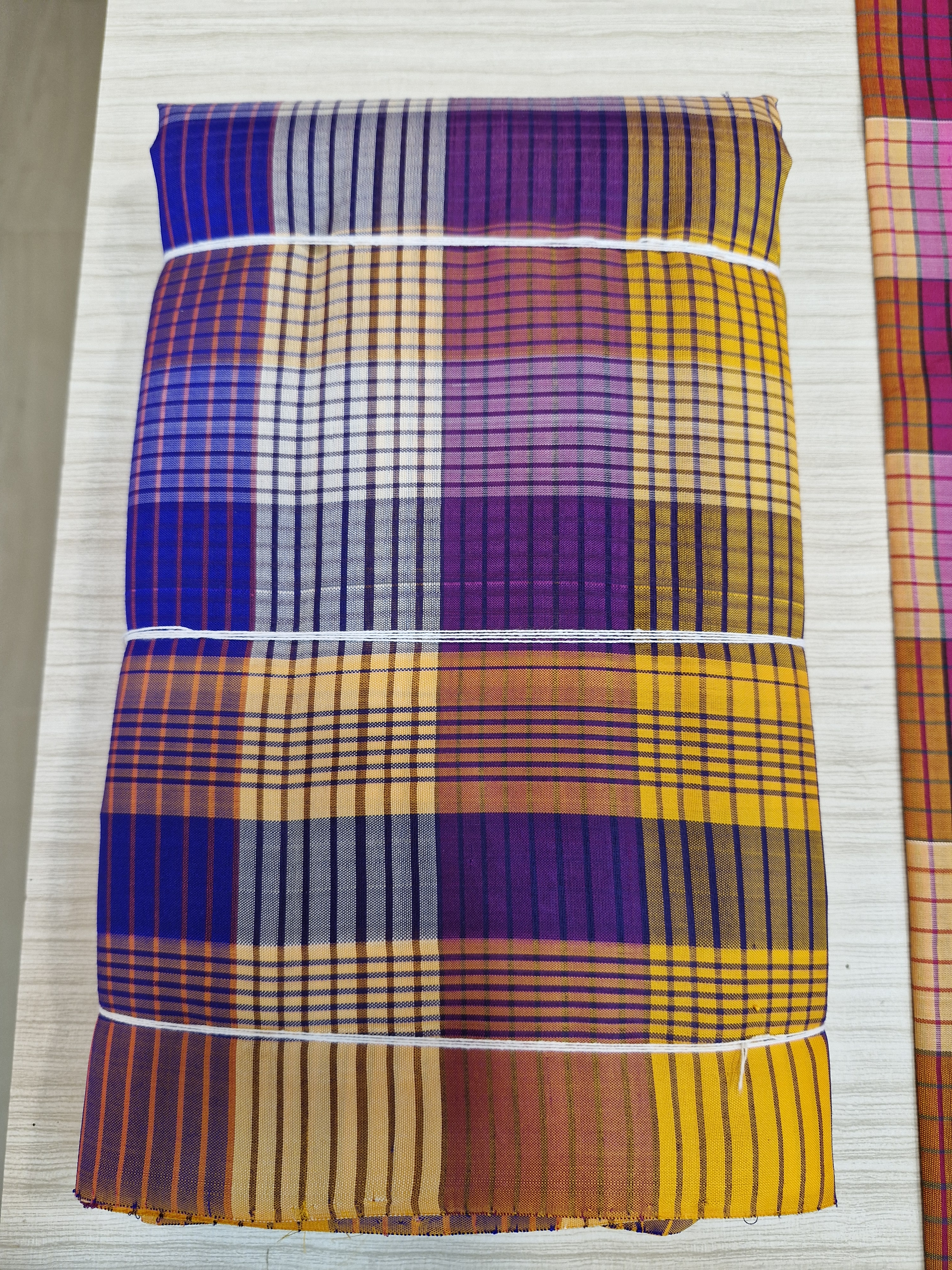
Koorai silk sari pattern

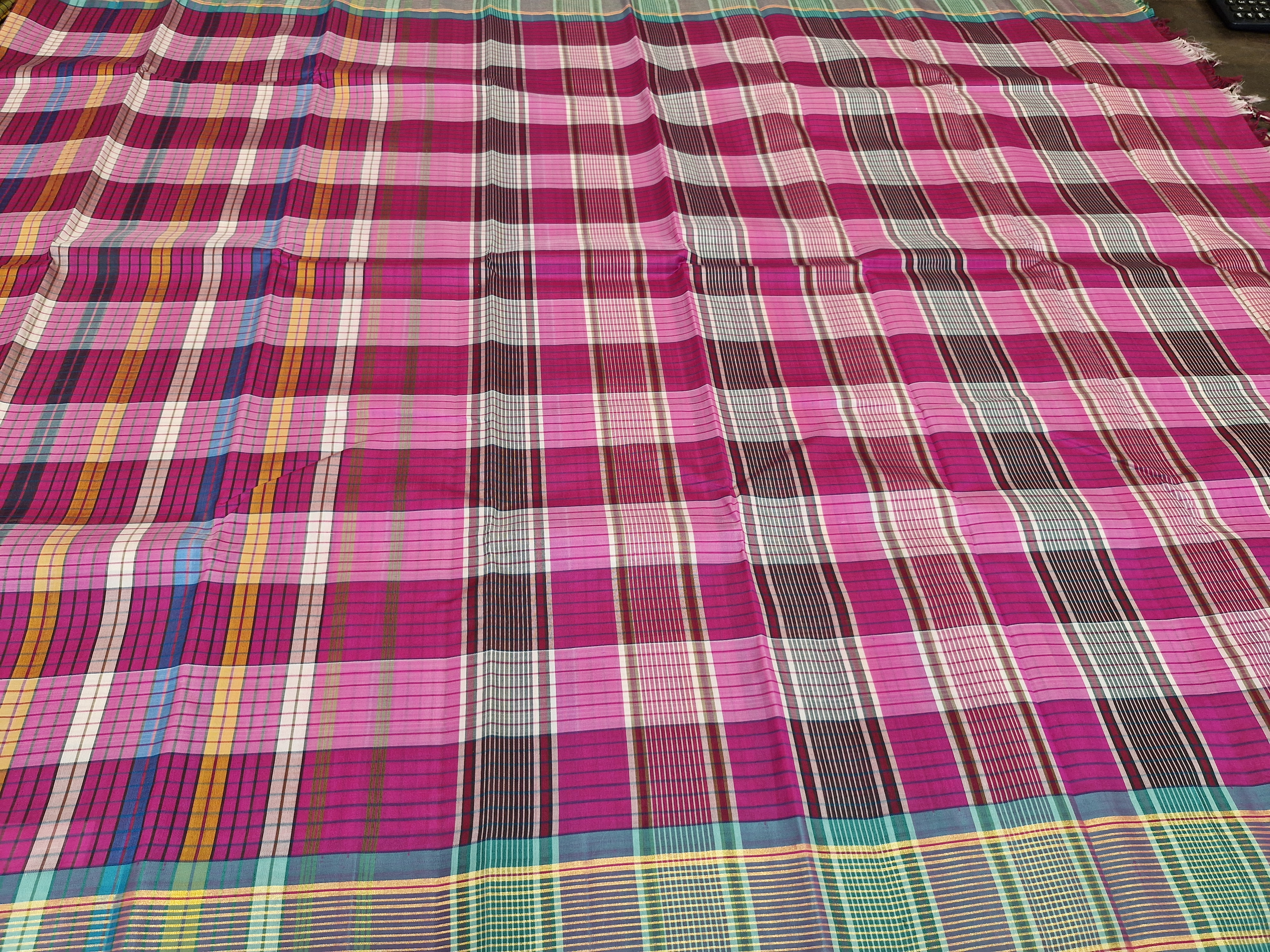
Koorai silk sari

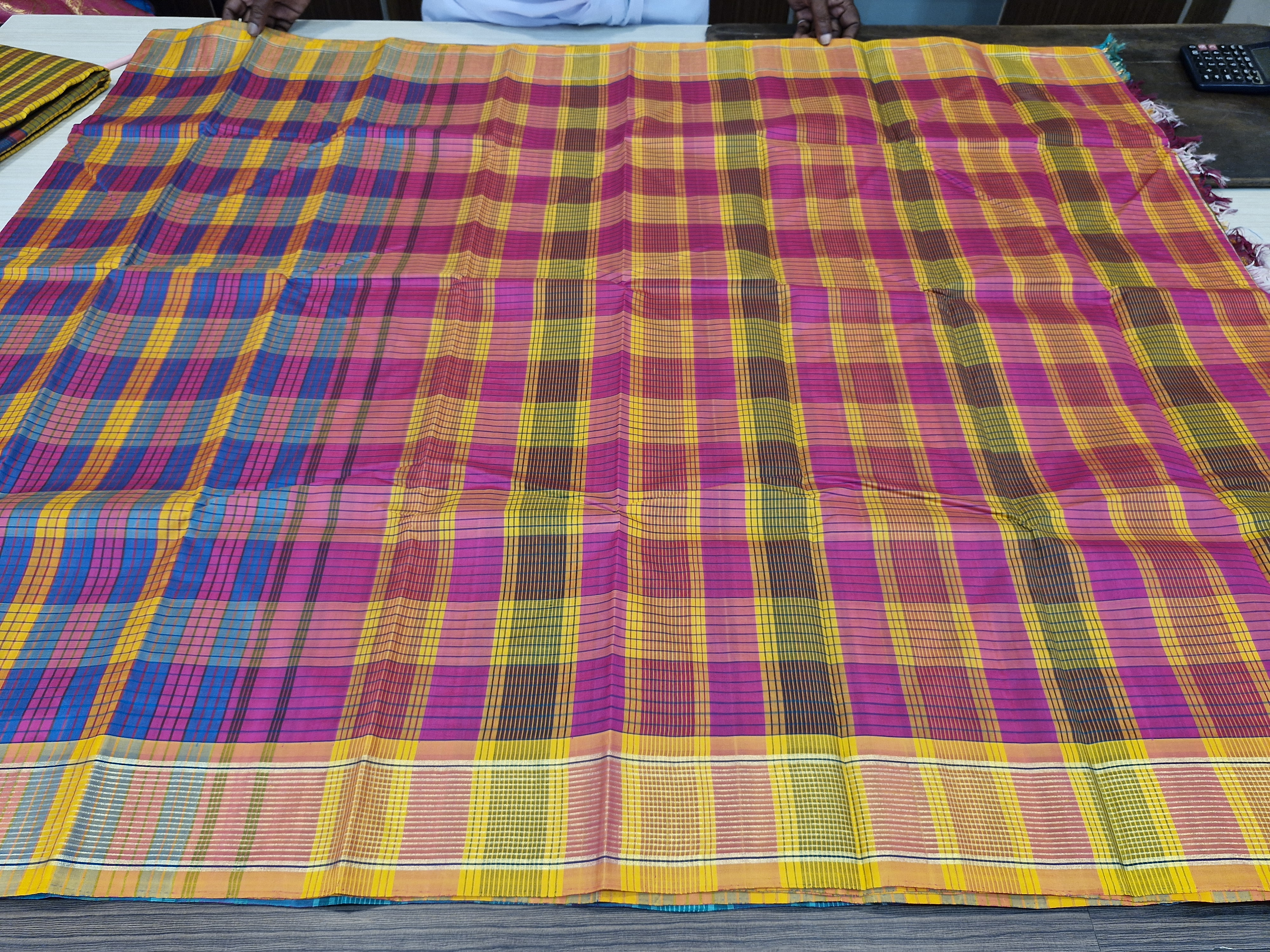
Koorai silk sari

== See also ==
- Kanchipuram silk sari
- Sari
- Mysore silk
- Thirubuvanam silk sari
