= Koorainadu Punukeeswarar Temple =

Hindu temple in Tamil Nadu, India

- கூறைநாடு புனுகீஸ்வரர் கோயில்
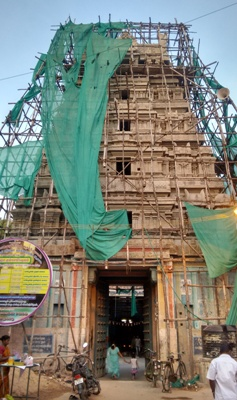
- Gopuram of the Punukeeswarar Temple

- Location within Tamil Nadu

Religion
- Affiliation: Hinduism
- District: Mayiladuthurai
- Deity: Punukeeswarar (Siva)

Location
- Location: Koranad, Mayiladuthurai
- State: Tamil Nadu
- Country: India
- Interactive map of Koorainadu Punukeeswarar Temple
- Coordinates: 11°05′43″N 79°38′37″E

Architecture
- Architect: Dravidian

Koorainadu Punukeeswarar Temple, or simply Punukeeswarar Temple, is a Hindu temple located in Koorainadu (also known as Koranad) in the town of Mayiladuthurai, Tamil Nadu, India. The temple is dedicated to Lord Punukeeswarar, a form of Shiva.

== Location ==
The temple is located in Koranad, a residential neighbourhood in Mayiladuthurai on the Mayiladuthurai to Kumbakonam state highway, a couple of kilometers south of the Cauvery River. It is about 256 km (159 mi) southeast of Chennai, the state capital. The nearest railway station is Mayiladuthurai railway junction, 2 km (1.2 mi) from the temple. The nearest bus terminal is Mayiladuthurai, 1.5 km (0.93 mi) from the temple.

== Etymology ==
According to the historical legend, a civet (punugu pūnai or civet cat) in the forest area of Koranad was searching for a goddess to worship and receive divine blessings. The civet looked for a Shiva Lingam in the surrounding area and found one in a paddy field. It applied punugu (civetone), an ancient fragrance, to the sacred Lingam and offered vilva (Aegle marmelos) leaves to Lord Shiva in worship, having brought the leaves reverently in its mouth. After many days of prayer, Lord Shiva is believed to have appeared before the civet, granted it divine status, and offered it a place in Mount Kailash.

== Architecture ==
Beyond the rajagopuram (main tower), the entrance leads into the front hall (mukha mandapa), where the temple flagstaff (kodimaram) is located. Following the flagstaff are the bali peetha (altar) and Nandi statue. On the right side of the temple premises is the shrine of the Goddess Amman.

Circumambulating the sanctum (garbhagriha), one can see the shrine of Chandikeswari. In front of the Amman shrine, there are also the bali peetha and Nandi. Near the Amman shrine are the decorative hall and resting chamber.

Along the corridor around the sanctum, there are shrines dedicated to Varadha Vinayakar, Anjaneyar, Somaskanda, Ayyappan, Nesanayanar (one of the 63 Nayanmars), and Subramaniyar. In the outer circumambulatory path, there are shrines for Surya, Bhairavar, and Keelakkumaran Subramaniyar. Nearby is the Navagraha (nine planets) shrine, followed by the 63 Nayanmars.

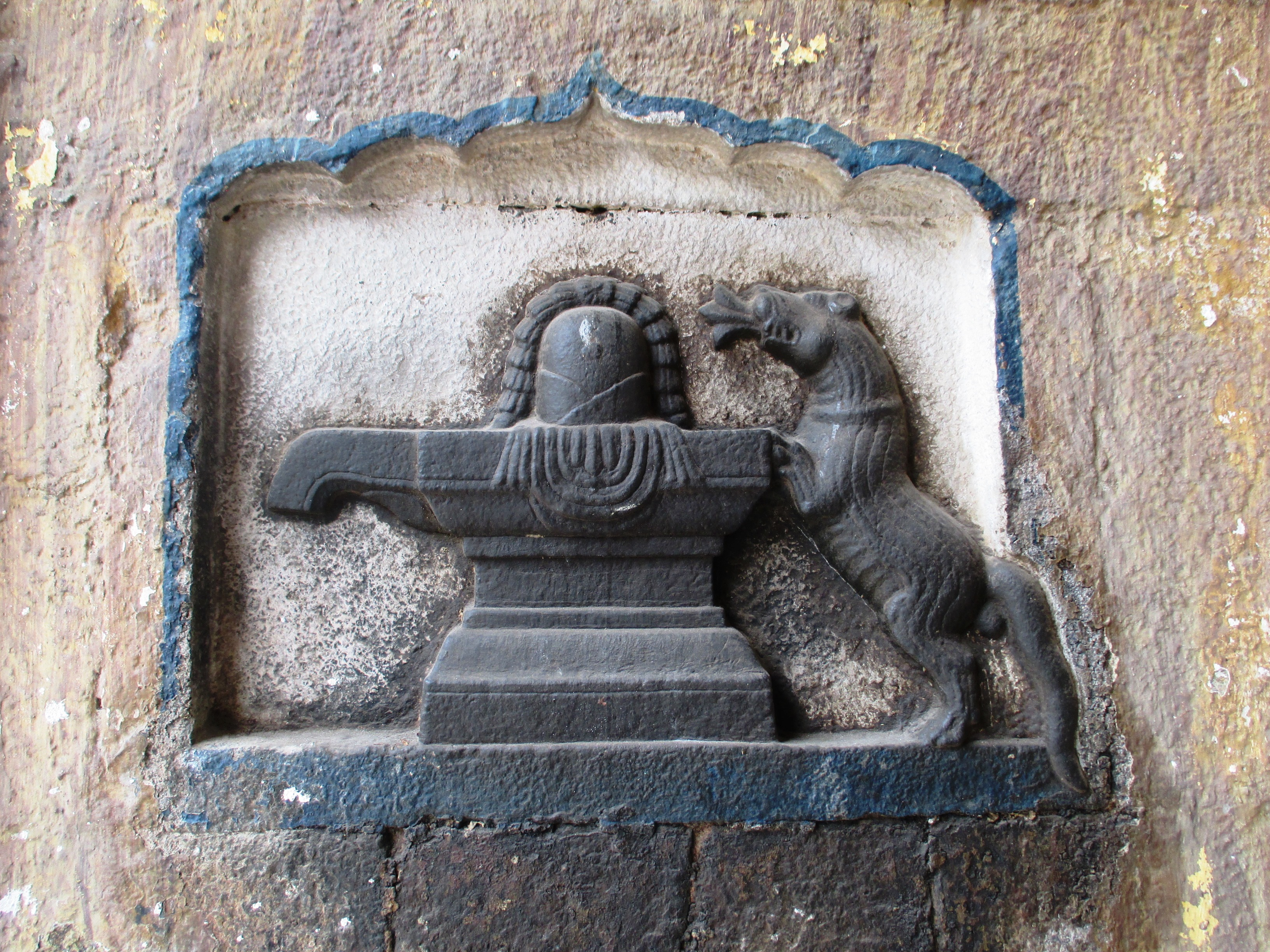
Punugu pūnai worshipping Lord Shiva

On the koshta (outer wall of the sanctum), images of Brahma, Adimudi Kaana Annal (Lord Shiva as the Infinite), Dakshinamurthy, and Vinayaka are seen. The shrine of Chandikeswarar is situated nearby. In the outer prakaram, there are sculptures of Shaniswaran, Lingathirumeni (Shiva Lingam with altar and Nandi in front), and Vinayakar.

As of June 2016, renovation works (thiruppani) were being carried out in the temple.

== Deity ==
The presiding deity of the temple is Punukeeswarar, and the goddess is Santhanayaki.

== Mayiladuthurai Saptha stana temples ==
This temple is one of the seven Shiva temples that take part in the Sapthasthanam festival, which is celebrated at the Ayyarappar Temple under the administration of the Thiruvaduthurai Adheenam located in Mayiladuthurai district.

1. Mayuranathaswami temple – Mayiladuthurai.
2. Margasahayeswarar temple (Vazhikaatum Vallalar) – Moovalur.
3. Aiyaarappar temple - Koranad, Mayiladuthurai.
4. Kasi Vishwanathar temple - Lagadam, Mayiladuthurai.
5. Brahmapureeswarar temple - Sitharkadu, Mayiladuthurai.
6. Azhagiyanathar temple - Sholampettai, Mayiladuthurai.

The presiding deities of these seven temples come together at the Mayuranathar Temple during the Sapthasthanam festival, which is held annually in Mayiladuthurai.

== Gallery ==
Punukeeswarar temple, Mayavaram6
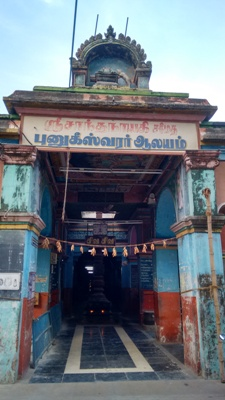
Main entrance after gopuram

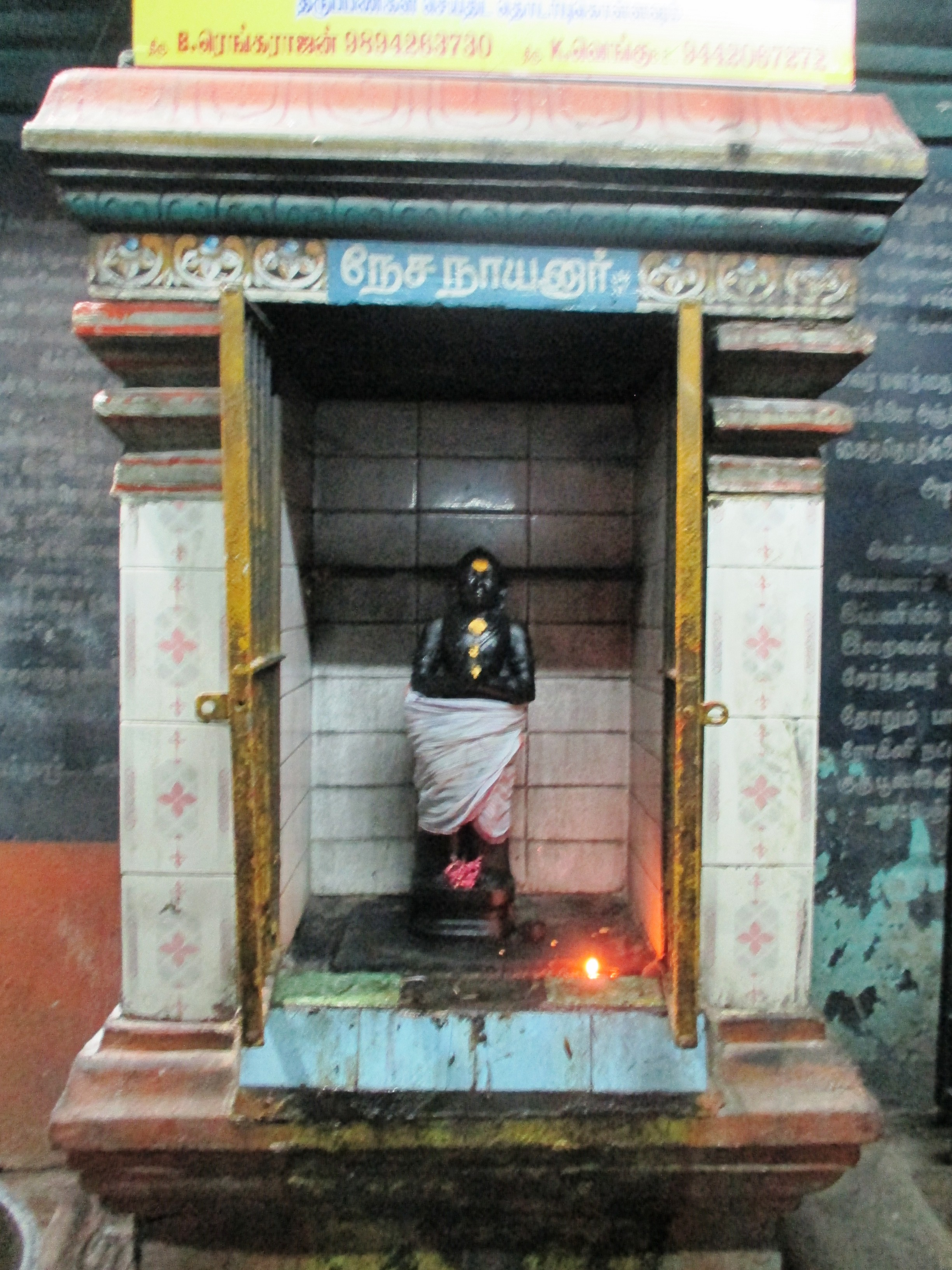
Nesanayanar (one of the 63 Nayanmars)

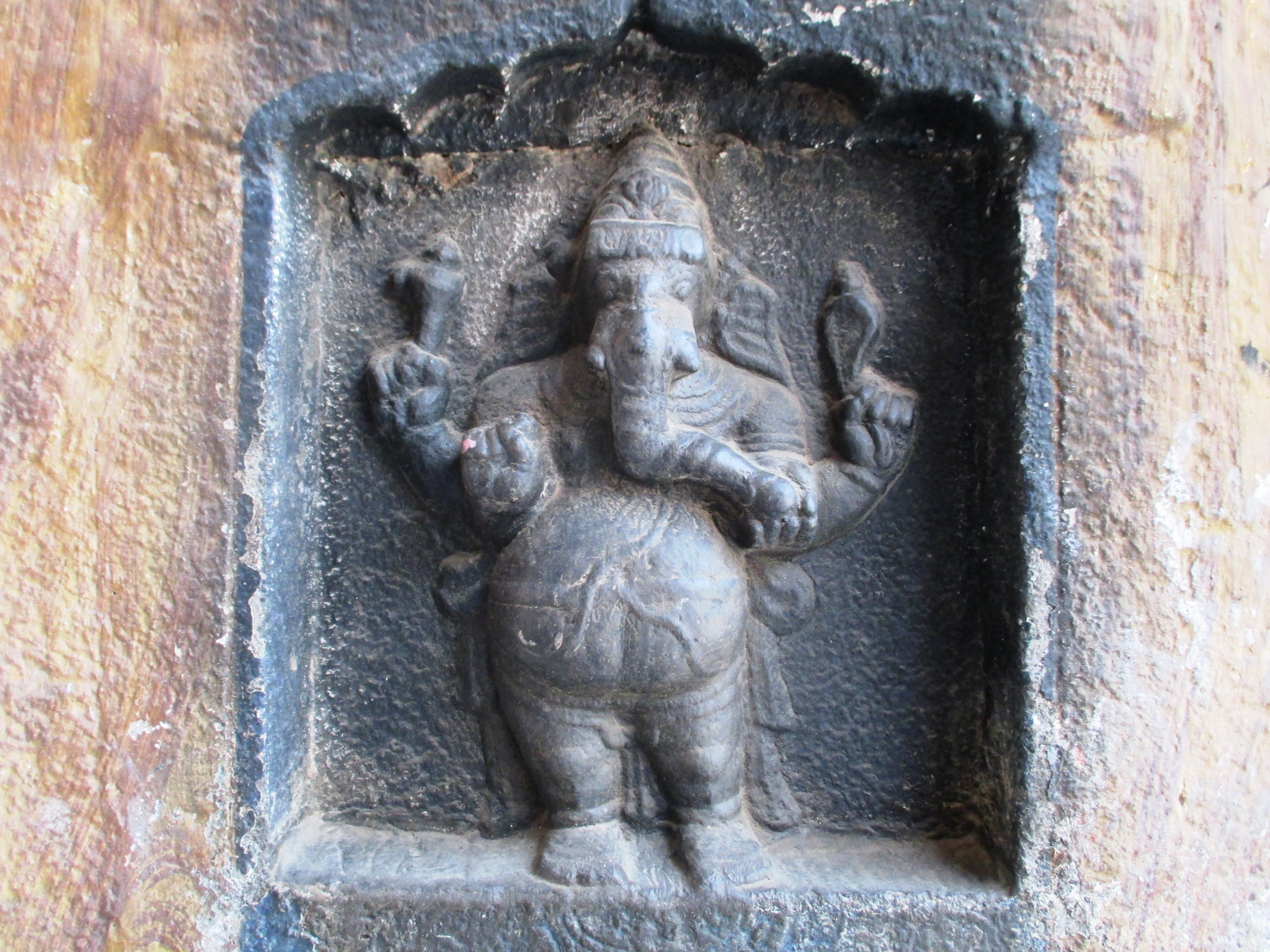
Pilliyar

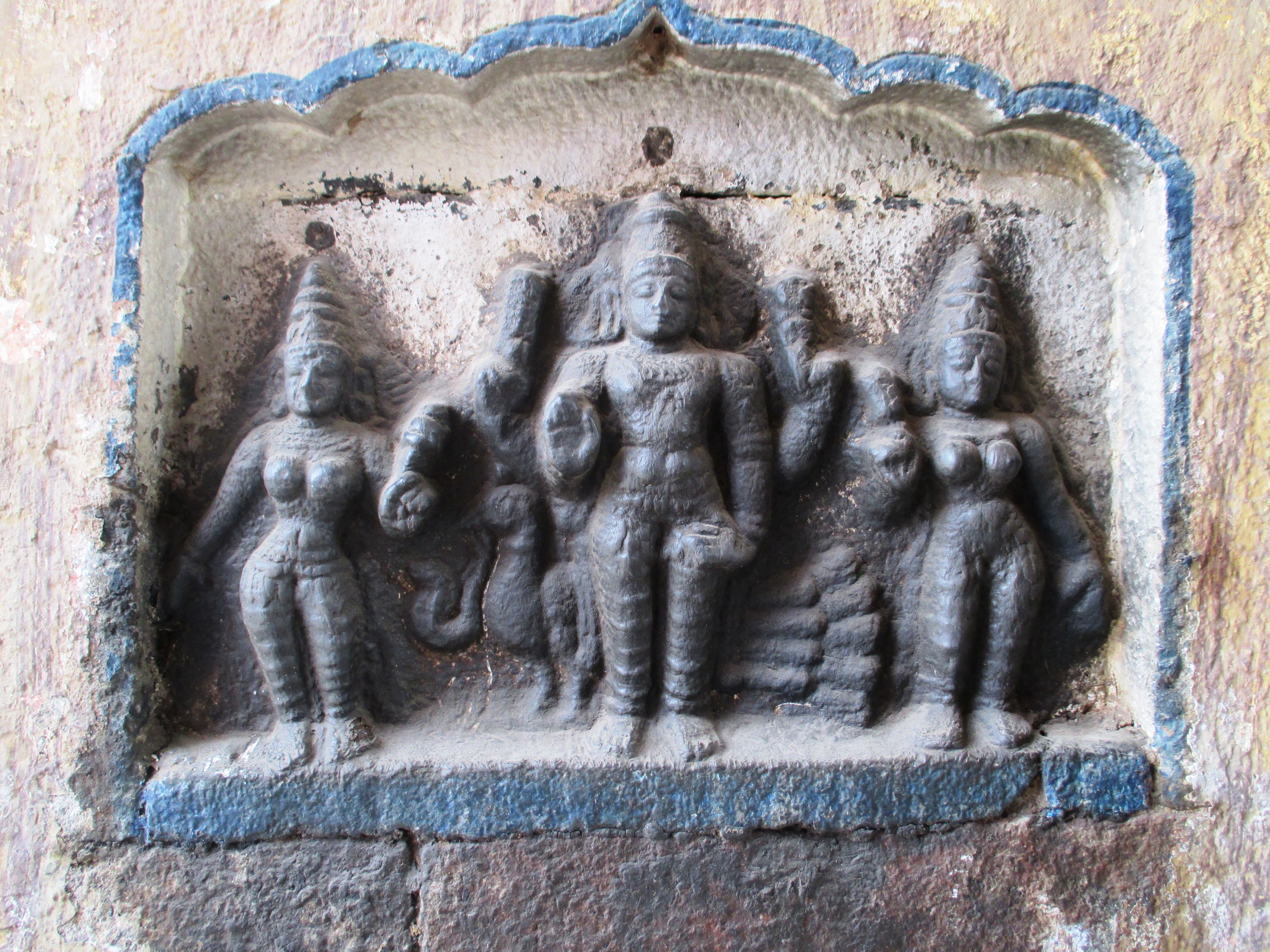
Ambal

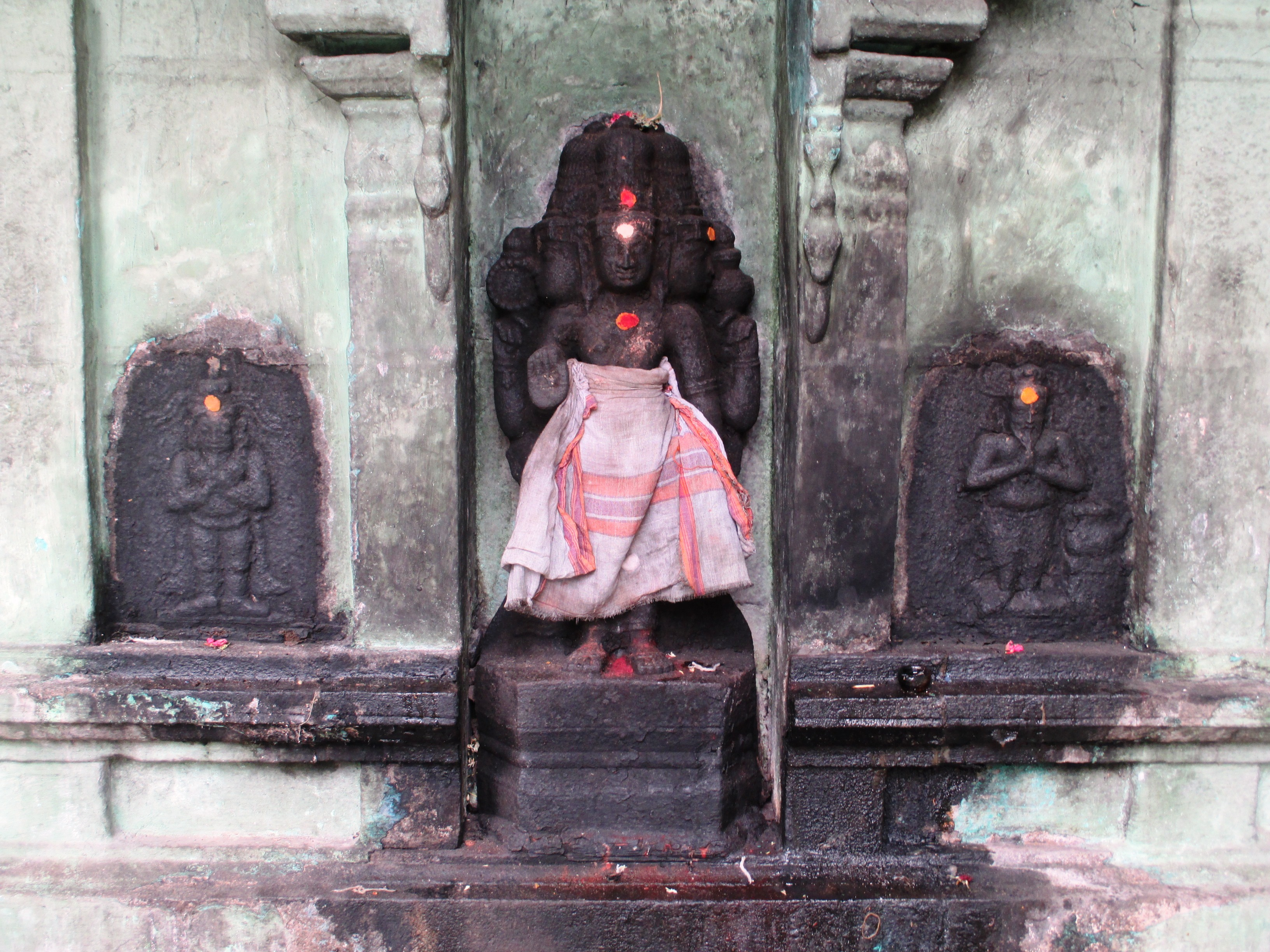
Ambal

== See also ==
- Mayiladuthurai
- Saptha Stana Temples
- Koranad

== Bibliography ==
- S. R., Balasubrahmanyam (23 Apr 1978). Later Chola Temples [PANCHANADISVARAR TEMPLE] (PDF) (1st ed.). MUDGALA TRUST. p. 336.
