= Mayiladuthurai =

Mayiladuthurai Māyavaram Mayuram
- Special Grade Municipality
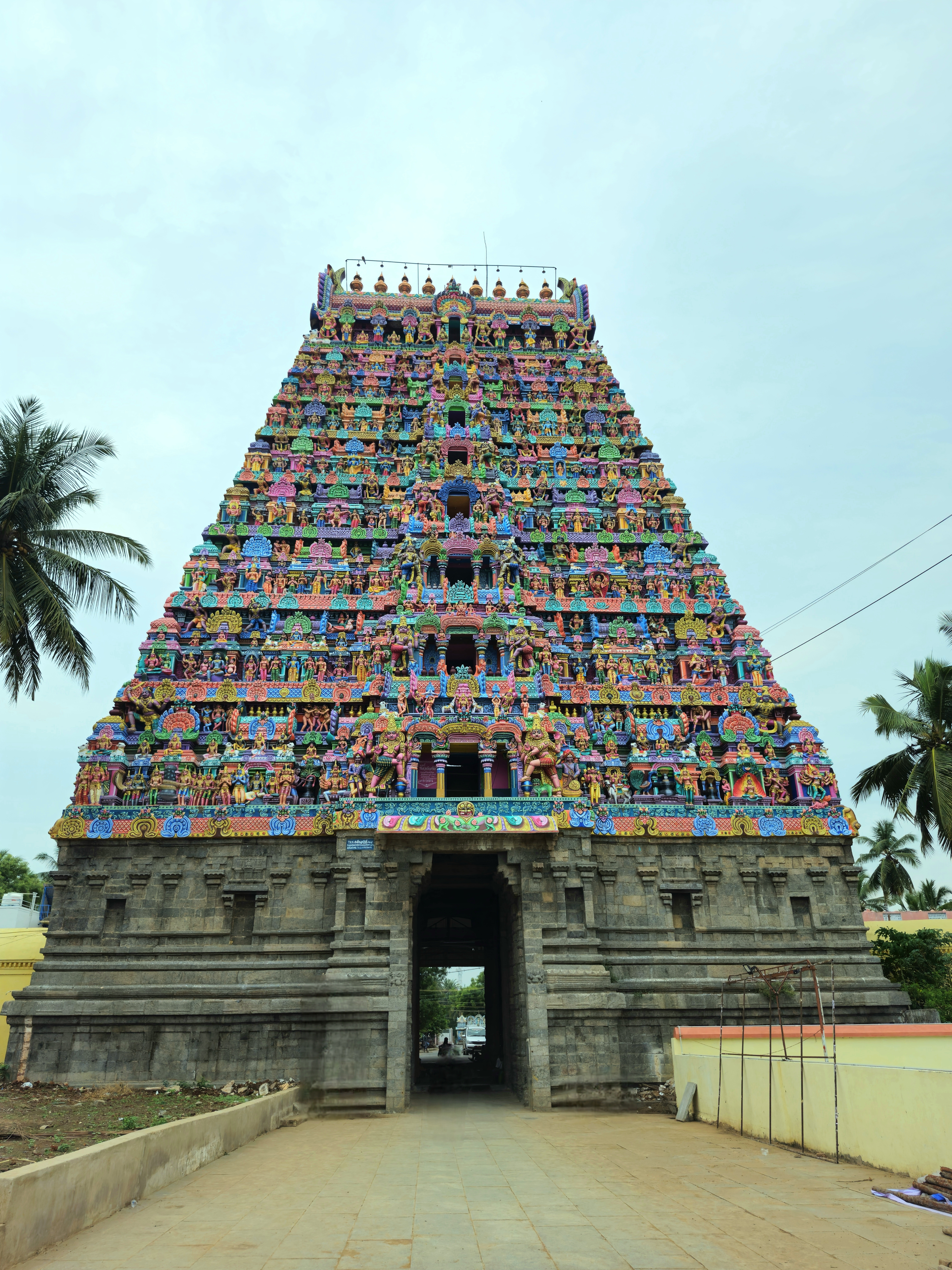
- Mayuranathar Temple at Mayiladuthurai

- Mayiladuthurai, Tamil Nadu
- Coordinates: 11°06′07″N 79°39′00″E
- Country: India
- State: Tamil Nadu
- District: Mayiladuthurai
- Region: Cauvery Delta

Government
  - Type: Special Grade Municipality
  - Body: Mayiladuthurai Municipality
  - Chairman: N Selvaraj

Area
  - Total: 55 km^{2} (21 sq mi)
- Elevation: 16 m (52 ft)

Population (2011)
  - Total: 85,632
  - Density: 1,600/km^{2} (4,000/sq mi)

Languages
  - Official: Tamil
- Time zone: UTC+5:30 (IST)
- PIN: 609001
- Telephone code: +91–4364
- Vehicle registration: TN-82

Mayiladuthurai (formerly known as Mayavaram or Mayuram) is a Special Grade Municipality and the district headquarters of Mayiladuthurai district in Tamil Nadu, India. The town is located 256 km (159 mi) from the state capital, Chennai.

In medieval times, Mayiladuthurai was ruled by the Chola Dynasty. It was subsequently part of the Pallavas, Pandiyas, Vijayanagara Empire, Thanjavur Nayak kingdom, Thanjavur Maratha kingdom, and eventually the British Empire. Mayiladuthurai was a part of the erstwhile Tanjore district until India's independence in 1947, Thanjavur district until 1991, and subsequently a part of the newly formed Nagapattinam district until 2020. Mayiladuthurai was carved out of Nagapattinam district and inaugurated as the 38th district of Tamil Nadu on 28 December 2020.

Mayiladuthurai is administered by a town panchayat established in 1866. In 1949, it was upgraded to a selection-grade municipality, and in 2023 it was upgraded to special-grade municipality status. As of 2025, the municipality covered an area of 11.27 km^{2} (4.35 mi^{2}). Mayiladuthurai is within the Mayiladuthurai constituency of the Tamil Nadu Legislative Assembly and elects its member once every five years. It is part of the Mayiladuthurai constituency of the national assembly and elects its Member of Parliament (MP) also once every five years.

Mayiladuthurai serves as an important junction of the main line connecting Chennai with Trichy. Roadways and railways are the major mode of transportation to the town. The nearest airport, Pondicherry Airport, is located 116 km (72 mi) away. The town is known for agriculture and weaving. As Mayiladuthurai district is situated on the east coast, fishing plays a vital role in generating its revenue. In 2023, the district was declared a protected agricultural zone.

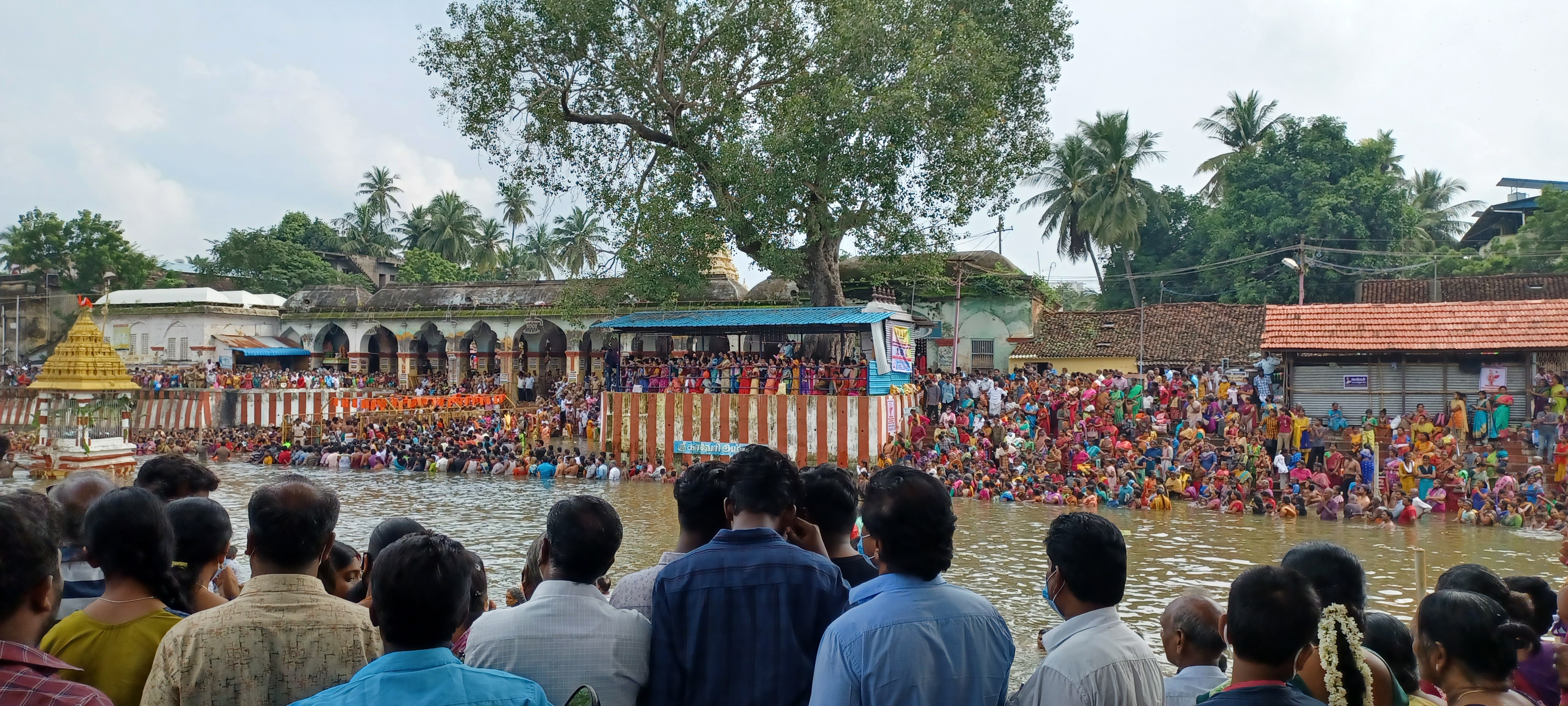
The Thula Kattam or Tula Ghat in Mayiladuthurai, on the banks of the Cauvery river.

== Etymology ==
The name Mayiladuthurai is derived from a story in which the goddess Parvathi manifested herself as a peacock (mayil) to attract the attention of Lord Shiva through a miraculous dance. Mayuranathaswami Temple is one of the most important Hindu temples in the town. There is a statue depicting goddess Amman in a peahen form worshipping lingam, an iconic symbol of Shiva.

== History ==
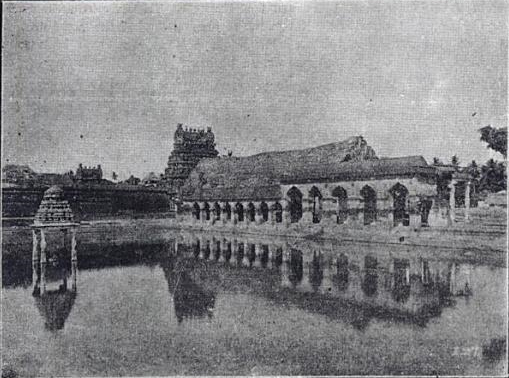
Mayuranathaswami temple tank filled with water from the Kaveri River

Mayiladuthurai is known to have been inhabited since the 3rd millennium BC. Ancient pottery shards have been found at Akkur, 14 km (8.7 mi) to the east of Mayiladuthurai. In 2006, artifacts with Indus Valley signs dated between 2000 and 1500 BC were found at the nearby village of Sembiyankandiyur. There were references to Mayiladuthurai in the works of the 7th century Saivite saint Sambandar.

The region's oldest extant temples date to the time of the Cholas. Epigraphic records indicate that during the Medieval Chola period, the Mayavaram region formed parts of two administrative divisions: Rajadhiraja-valanadu, named after Rajendra Cholan I and Uyyakkondar-valanadu, an administrative divisions in Kaveri delta region. During the reign of Kulottunga I and his successors, the division was also referred to by names such as Rajanarayana-valanadu, Rajasundara-valanadu, and Jayangonda-Chola-valanadu. A copper-plate land-grant charter inscription, issued during the reigns of Rajadhiraja Chola I and his younger brother Rajendra Chola II, was discovered on 20 May 2010 at Kazhukani Muttam, a hamlet of Thiruvilandur, Mayiladuthurai. The Thiruvilandur plates provide information on the Chola state in the mid-11th century, including the establishment of a Brahmadeya, a tax-free settlement, and the administration of land, taxation, irrigation, local assemblies and land grants. The Thiruvindalur charter is described as the longest and heaviest copper-plate charter known in Indian epigraphy, surpassing the earlier Tiruvalangadu and Anaimangalam copper-plate charters of Rajendra Chola I, and predating the Karandai charter.

An inscription discovered at Akkur in the Mayavaram records the activities of Pallava ruler Kopperunchinga I during the 13th century AD. The record states that he subdued the forces of the Hoysala Empire and exacted tribute from the Pandya dynasty before returning to the Chola dynasty country. Travelling eastward along the southern bank of the Kaveri River, he visited several sacred sites, ordered repairs to temples, and granted tax-free status to lands belonging to them.

In the later 13th century AD, inscriptions of the Pandyas in the Mayavaram record the activities of rulers such as Jatavarman Sundara Pandya I and Maravarman Sundara Pandyan I. These inscriptions, found at Akkur temple, document temple endowments and other administrative actions.

The Thanjavur Nayak king Raghunatha Nayak constructed mandapams in Mayiladuthurai. During the 17th and 18th centuries AD, Mayiladuthurai was ruled by the Thanjavur Marathas.

In 1799, Mayiladuthurai was ceded to the British East India Company, along with the rest of the Thanjavur Maratha kingdom, by the Thanjavur Maratha ruler Serfoji II. Mayiladuthurai prospered under British rule, emerging as an important town in the Tanjore district. When the Tanjore district was trifurcated in 1991, Mayiladuthurai was transferred to the newly formed Nagapattinam district. Mayiladuthurai District, with the town as its headquarters, was inaugurated as the 38th district of Tamil Nadu on 28 December 2020. The district was carved out of the existing Nagapattinam district.

== Geography and climate ==
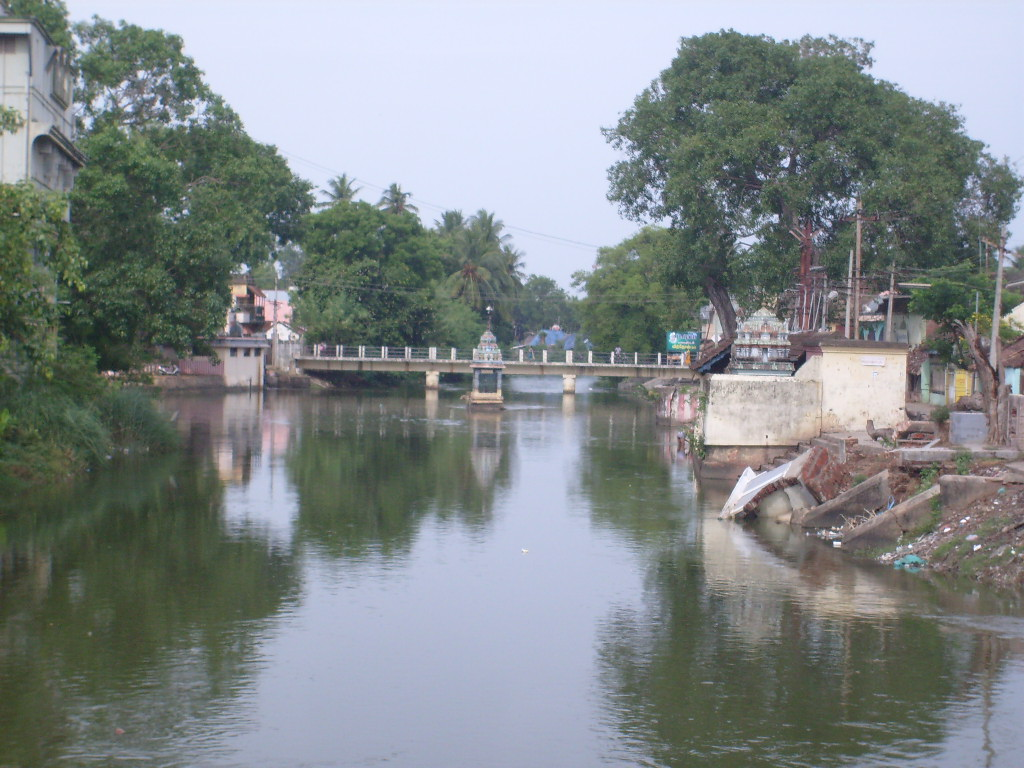
Bridge across the Cauvery River connecting Uttara Mayuram with Mayiladuthurai town

Mayliladuthurai is located 281 kilometres (175 mi) from Chennai and 122 kilometres (76 mi) from Tiruchirappalli. Situated at a distance of 24 kilometres (15 mi) from the Bay of Bengal coast, the town is situated at an altitude of barely 16 metres (52 ft) above mean sea level. The Kaveri River runs through the town, bisecting it into Uttara Mayuram and Mayuram proper. Most of the town lies to the south of the river, and the Mayuranathaswami Temple lies a mile to its south. The Parimala Ranganatha Perumal temple is situated at Tiruindalur, which lies north of the Kaveri River; there is a bathing ghat on the river.

The climate of Mayiladuthurai is tropical, featuring hot temperatures throughout the year, with the exception of monsoon seasons. The average maximum temperature is 39.4 degrees Celsius, while the average minimum temperature is 32.8 degrees Celsius. The average annual rainfall is 1,125 mm (44.3 in).

Climate data for Mayiladuthurai
Month	Jan	Feb	Mar	Apr	May	Jun	Jul	Aug	Sep	Oct	Nov	Dec	Year
Record high °C (°F)	34.2 (93.6)	38.5 (101.3)	41.4 (106.5)	43.0 (109.4)	43.4 (110.1)	43.0 (109.4)	41.6 (106.9)	41.2 (106.2)	40.2 (104.4)	40.5 (104.9)	35.6 (96.1)	36.0 (96.8)	43.4 (110.1)
Mean daily maximum °C (°F)	30.0 (86.0)	32.3 (90.1)	35.3 (95.5)	37.2 (99.0)	38.3 (100.9)	36.9 (98.4)	36.1 (97.0)	35.6 (96.1)	34.3 (93.7)	32.0 (89.6)	29.5 (85.1)	28.3 (82.9)	33.8 (92.9)
Mean daily minimum °C (°F)	20.2 (68.4)	21.4 (70.5)	23.0 (73.4)	25.8 (78.4)	27.0 (80.6)	26.5 (79.7)	26.2 (79.2)	25.6 (78.1)	24.6 (76.3)	24.1 (75.4)	22.8 (73.0)	21.5 (70.7)	24.1 (75.3)
Record low °C (°F)	17.1 (62.8)	16.6 (61.9)	18.4 (65.1)	20.5 (68.9)	21.0 (69.8)	22.5 (72.5)	21.5 (70.7)	21.6 (70.9)	21.0 (69.8)	21.0 (69.8)	19.0 (66.2)	17.0 (62.6)	16.6 (61.9)
Average precipitation mm (inches)	37 (1.5)	15 (0.6)	13 (0.5)	19 (0.7)	47 (1.9)	38 (1.5)	63 (2.5)	113 (4.4)	121 (4.8)	191 (7.5)	352 (13.9)	100 (3.9)	1,109 (43.7)
Average precipitation days	1.0	0.5	0.8	1.4	3.2	2.6	2.9	5.3	6.2	10.0	9.7	6.0	49.6
Average relative humidity (%)	65	55	50	53	52	51	50	53	62	69	76	75	59
Source 1: India Meteorological Department (normals 1991–2020, extremes 1975–1999, estimated)
Source 2: Climate-Data.org (precipitation)

== Demographics ==
Religious census
Religion	Percent(%)
Hindu	88.69%
Muslim	6.38%
Christian	4.19%
Sikh	0.04%
Buddhist	0.03%
Jain	0.32%
Other	0.35%

According to the 2011 census, Mayiladuthurai had a population of 85,632 with a sex-ratio of 1,045 females for every 1,000 males, much above the national average of 929. A total of 7,720 were under the age of six, constituting 3,883 males and 3,837 females. Scheduled Castes and Scheduled Tribes accounted for 5.87% and .57% of the population respectively. The average literacy rate of the town was 83.55%, compared to the national average of 72.99%. The town had a total of 21,929 households. There were a total of 29,855 workers, comprising 321 cultivators, 707 main agricultural labourers, 734 in household industries, 23,004 other workers, 5,089 marginal workers, 74 marginal cultivators, 485 marginal agricultural labourers, 246 marginal workers in household industries, and 4,284 other marginal workers. As of 2001, there were 26 slums in Mayiladuthurai, with a total population of 32,381.

Historical population
Year	Pop.	±%
1871	21,165	—
1881	23,044	+8.9%
1891	23,766	+3.1%
1901	24,276	+2.1%
1911	27,121	+11.7%
1921	28,617	+5.5%
1931	31,887	+11.4%
1941	32,670	+2.5%
1951	43,436	+33.0%
1961	51,393	+18.3%
1971	60,195	+17.1%
1981	70,019	+16.3%
1991	76,837	+9.7%
2001	84,290	+9.7%
2011	85,632	+1.6%
2026	126,000	+47.1%
* 1871-1931: 1941-1991: 2011: 2026: Estimated

The density of population is higher in the core areas, along the banks of river Cauvery, compared to the peripheral areas. As of 1996, a total 498.84 ha (4.9884 km^{2}) (44.27%) of the land was used for residential, 68.87 ha (0.6887 km^{2}) (6.11%) for commercial, 6.33 ha (0.0633 km^{2}) (0.56%) for industrial, 22.35 ha (0.2235 km^{2}) (1.98%) for educational, 24.27 ha (0.2427 km^{2}) (2.16%) for public and semi-public purposes; and 506.35 ha (5.0635 km^{2}) (44.92%) was devoted to agriculture. As of 2008, there were a total of 26 notified slums, with 16,434, comprising 13% of the total population, residing there. The municipal data pointed to an increase in population in slum areas.

Hinduism is the major religion followed in Mayiladuthurai, and Tamil is the major language spoken. The vast majority of the populace are engaged in agriculture. About 15 percent of the total working population are engaged in trade while 25 percent are engaged in other commercial activities. As per the religious census of 2011, Mayiladuthurai had 88.69% Hindus, 6.38% Muslims, 4.19% Christians, 0.04% Sikhs, 0.03% Buddhists, 0.32% Jains, and 0.35% following other religions.

As of 2026, the estimated population of Mayiladuthurai municipality is approximately 126,000. The 2021 census of India was postponed due to COVID-19 pandemic. The next censes expected to conduct in 2027, is anticipated to have preliminary result released by late 2027, with the final report expected by late 2028.

== Administration and politics ==
District Administration
District Collector	H.S.Srikanth.,IAS
Superintendent of Police	G.Stalin
District Revenue Officer	R.Poongudi
Municipality Officials
Commissioner	A. Veera Muthukumar
Chairman	N.Selvaraj
Vice Chairman	S.Sivakkumar
Elected Members
Member of Legislative Assembly	Jamal Mohamed Younoos
Member of Parliament	Sudha Ramakrishnan

Mayiladuthurai is the headquarters of the Mayiladuthurai district. The town of Mayiladuthurai is administered by a municipal council which was created in 1866, as per the Town Improvements Act 1865. The council initially had eleven members. This was increased to 18 in 1883. As of 2025, the municipality covers an area of 11.27 km^{2} (4.35 mi^{2}) and its council, in which legislative powers are vested, has a total of 36 members, one from each of the town's 36 wards. The council is headed by an elected chairperson assisted by a deputy chairperson. The functions of the municipality are divided into six departments: General, Engineering, Revenue, Public Health, Town Planning, and the Computer Wing. All these departments are under the control of a municipal commissioner who is the supreme executive head. There are a total of four revenue villages with Mayiladuthurai - Thiruvilandur, Dharmapuram, Nanchilnadu and Kornad. In 2023, Mayiladuthurai's selection grade municipality status was upgraded to special grade municipality.

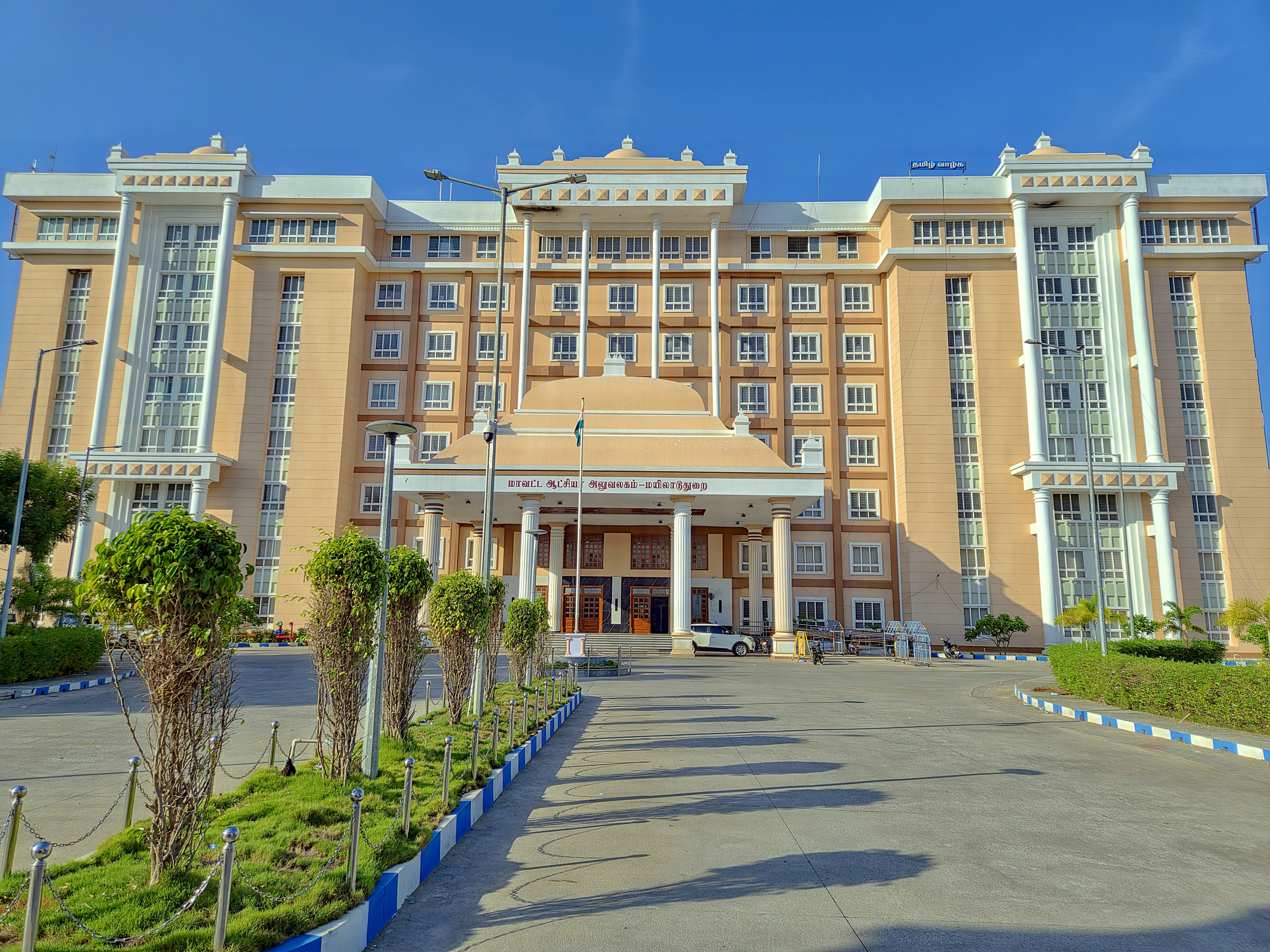
District collector office

Mayiladuthurai is represented in the Tamil Nadu Legislative Assembly by the Mayiladuthurai state assembly constituency seat. The current Member of Legislative Assembly is S. Rajakumar of the Indian National Congress party alliance with Dravida Munnetra Kazhagam.

Mayiladuthurai is a part of the Mayiladuthurai (Lok Sabha constituency). The current Member of Parliament is Sudha Ramakrishnan of the Indian National Congress party alliance with Dravida Munnetra Kazhagam by the Indian National Developmental Inclusive Alliance.

== Utility services ==
Potable water is provided by the municipality. Mayiladuthurai's main source of water is the Kollidam River. A total of 7.50 million liters per day (MLD) are pumped out every day from five water tanks located in various parts of the town. About 104 metric tonnes of solid waste is generated every day, while 85 metric tonnes are collected from the town every day by door-to-door collection. Subsequent source segregation and dumping is carried out by the sanitary department of the municipality.

There is limited underground drainage in the town and the major sewer system for disposal of sullage is through septic tanks, open drains, and public conveniences. The municipality maintains a total of 39 km (24 mi) of surfaced storm water drains and 4 km (2.5 mi) kutcha (mud or brick) drains in Mayiladuthurai.

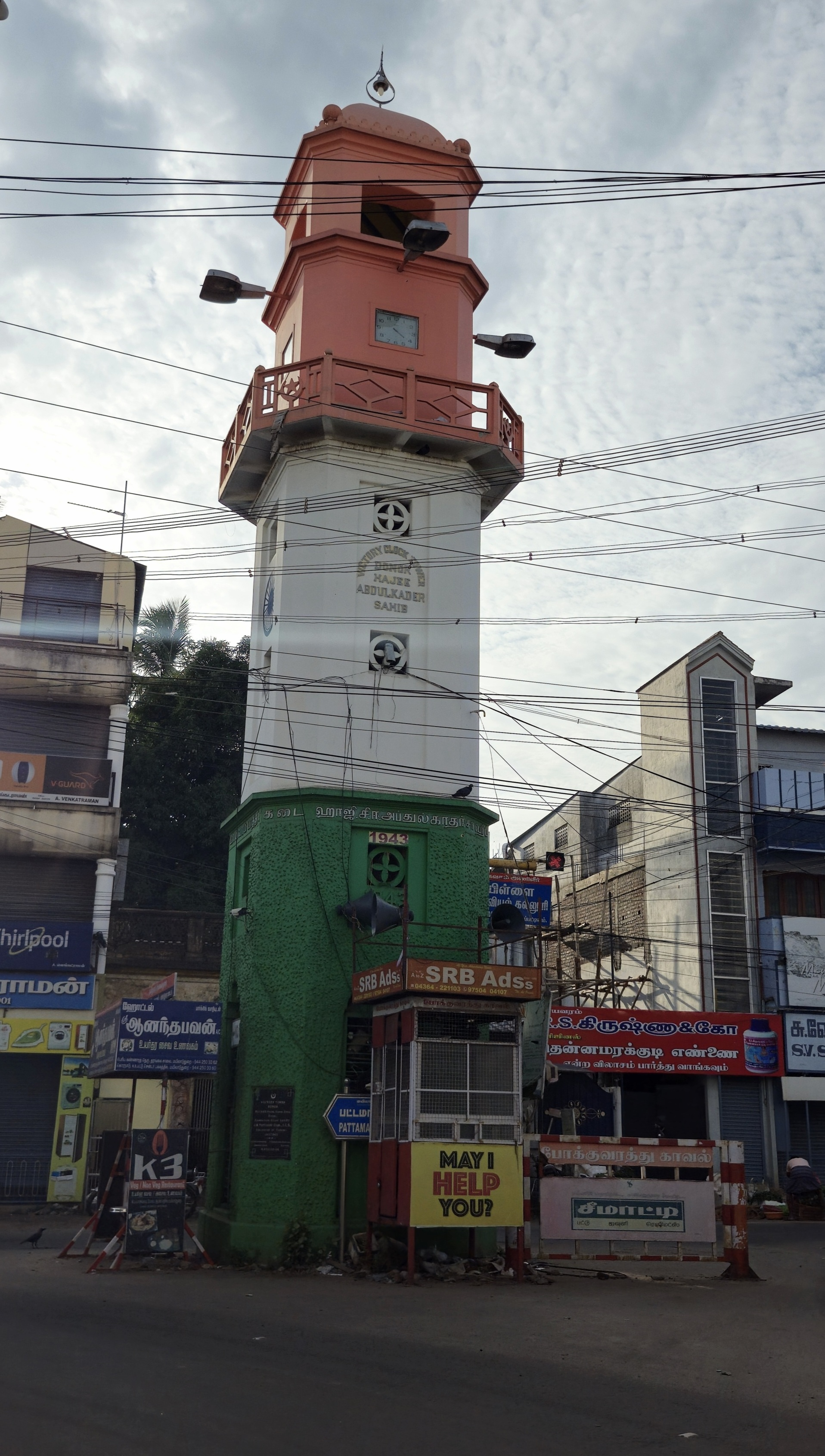
Clock tower in M. G. Road, Mayiladuthurai

The Mayiladuthurai municipality, under the AMRUT 2.0 scheme, has launched an ₹83 crore project to improve the city's underground drainage system. The initiative involves replacing 6 km of the existing backbone sewer, setting up a 36 km sewage collection network with over 6,000 household connections, and constructing two sewage treatment plants (STPs) with capacities of 9.05 MLD and 0.44 MLD. The project is scheduled to go live by early 2027.

In healthcare, there are five government hospitals, including a maternity ward, and twenty-five private hospitals and clinics. Periyar Government District Head Quarters Hospital, at Mayiladuthurai, provides a wide range of medical services, including emergency care, accident emergency care, surgery, maternity services, and outpatient consultations; it serves as a primary healthcare provider for numerous villages and towns around Mayiladuthurai. An additional building, constructed to address the hospital's space constraints, was inaugurated in February 2026. This new addition is expected to enhance the hospital's capacity, in adding specialized medical services.

== Education ==
The first convent schools in Mayiladuthurai were founded by Christian missionaries in April 1819. The Municipal High School, constructed by the municipality between 1885 and 1893, was considered to be one of the premium educational institutions in the erstwhile Tanjore district. As of 2025, Mayiladuthurai is home to over 30 educational institutions, primarily offering curricula based on the Tamil Nadu State Board and the CBSE. The town hosts a mix of government and private schools, including five government schools. The town also has one specialized school offering education for students with both blindness and deafness.

Notable colleges in the area include A. V. C. College, A. V. C. College of Engineering, A. R. C. Vishwanathan College, Tamil Nadu Open University (TNOU), Dharmapuram Adhinam Arts College, Dharmapuram Gnanambigai Government Arts College for Women.

== Economy ==
=== Agriculture ===
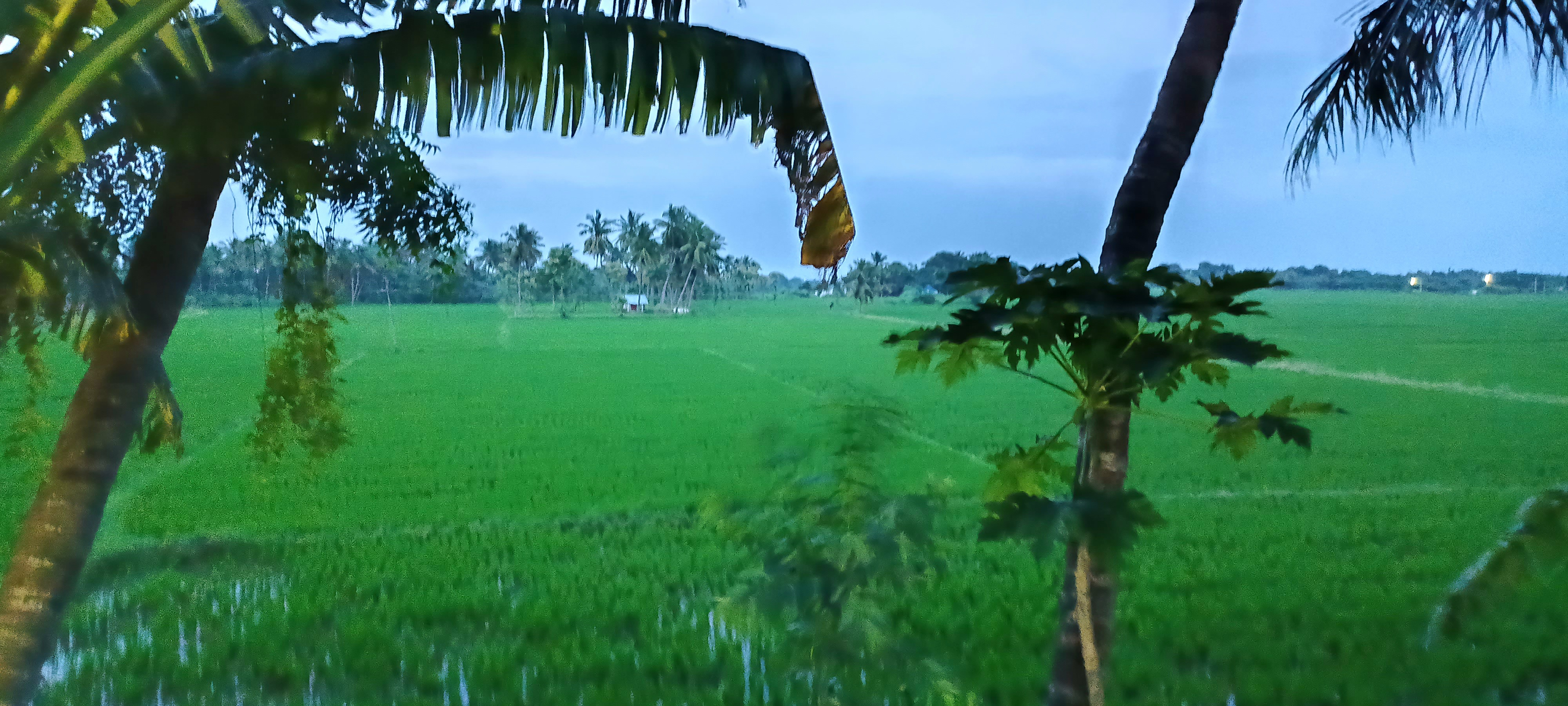
Paddy Field Mayiladuthurai

The economy of Mayiladuthurai is primarily agricultural. Mayiladuthurai has fertile soils due to its location in the Kaveri Delta. Paddy (rice) is the main crop, which is being cultivated in more than 90% of the agricultural area. Apart from paddy, crops such as coconuts, groundnuts, various pulses, gingelly (sesame), sugarcane, and cotton are also cultivated in the region. These agricultural products contribute significantly to the local economy.

Pathiri mango is a mango variety introduced and grown in Mayiladuthurai around the Mayiladuthurai district. The name Pathiri is a contraction of the Tamil word pathiriyar, which is usually translated as "priest" in English. The mango type was initially planted by Rev. Ochs, a German pastor and Christian missionary of the Tamil Evangelical Lutheran Church in Koranad, Mayiladuthurai.

=== Industry ===
The SIDCO industrial park in Mayiladuthurai, established in 2009 on 12.56 acres, located in Kulichar, Mayiladuthurai, supports small-scale industries, boosting employment. It hosts 31 operational units as of 2024. It fosters local entrepreneurship with subsidies such as 25% on capital and 20% on electricity for five years. Industries include biofuel, cement products, and food processing. Its growth reflects rising interest in agriculturally-based ventures. Confectioneries, printing presses, vehicle manufacturing units, and rice mills are the major industries in Mayiladuthurai. Industrial workers form 27.14 percent of the town's population as of 2011.

=== Weaving ===
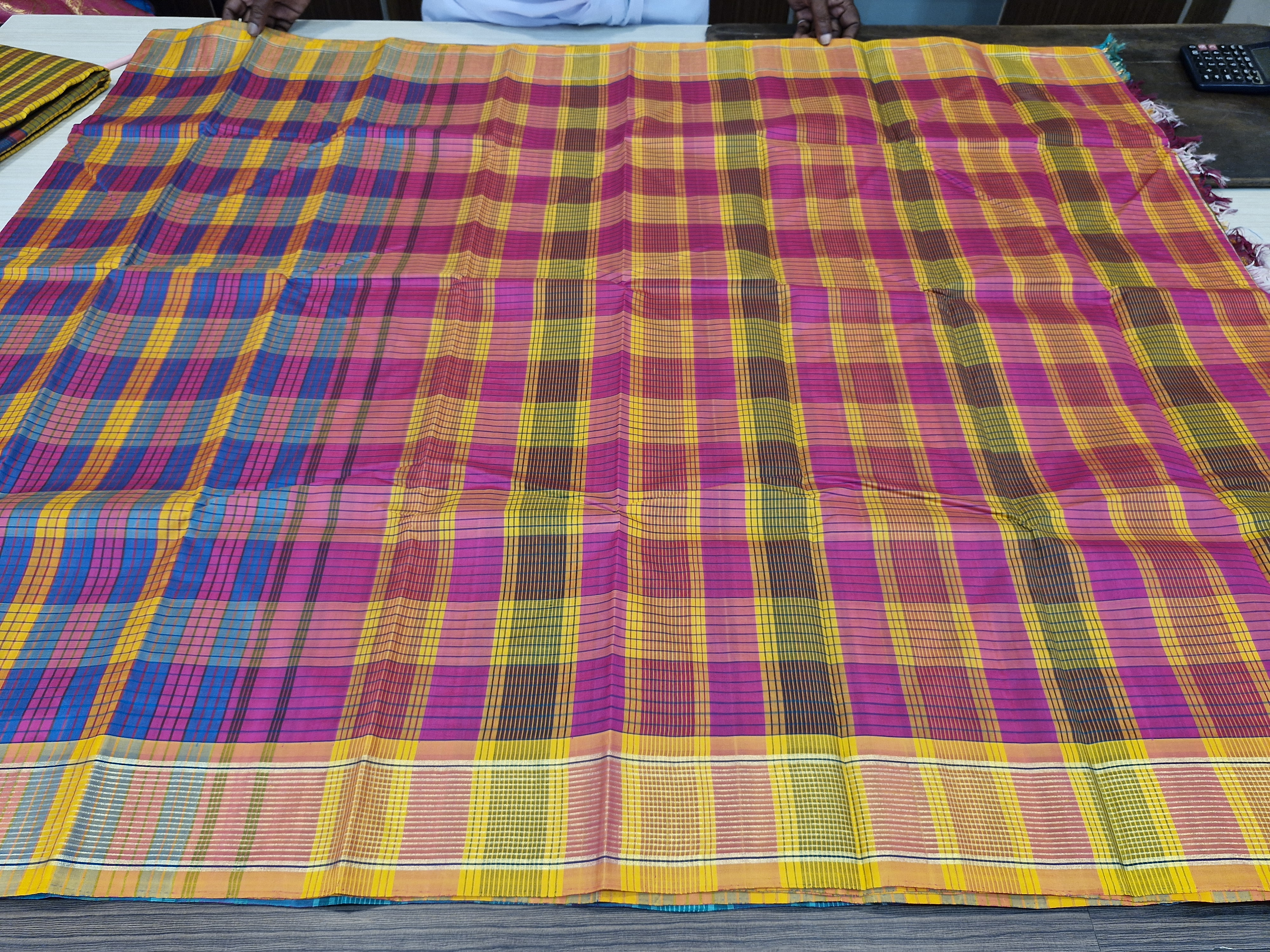
Koorai silk saree

Mayiladuthurai is known for its traditional weaving industry, contributing to the local economy. The heritage sari koorai pattu paduvai or Koorainadu sari has originated from Koorainadu or Kornad, a suburb of Mayiladuthurai. These saris are made from a blend of silk and cotton dyed in bright colours, featuring unique chequered patterns. They are deeply rooted in Tamil culture, and are especially worn during weddings and religious ceremonies.

=== Dry fish market ===
Mayiladuthurai's Karuvattu Santhai (dry fish market) was established over a century ago. Located along the Coromandel coast, it has been a central hub for the dry fish trade. The market—offering a variety of dried seafood, including shrimp, sardines, mackerel, and anchovies—contributes significantly to the local economy and culture.

=== Others ===
The municipality operates four markets—a vegetable market, weekly market, farmer's market (uzhavar santhai), and fish market—that cater to the needs of the town and the rural areas around it. There are many department stores in Mayiladuthurai. The only shopping complex is the Kittappa commercial complex which is maintained by the municipality.

== Transport ==
=== By road ===
The town has several significant routes passing through it, including state highways SH-22, SH-23, SH-64, SH-147, SH-149, and SH-150. These highways connect Mayiladuthurai to key neighbouring towns such as Thanjavur, Tiruvarur, Kumbakonam, Sirkali, Chidambaram, Poompuhar, Nagapattinam, and Karaikal.

In addition to the state highways, Mayiladuthurai is connected to various parts of Tamil Nadu through national highways. National Highway 32 (NH-32), also known as the East Coast Road, which begins in Chennai and terminates at Thoothukudi, provides vital connectivity to the region. Similarly, National Highway 36 (NH-36), extending from Vikravandi to Manamadurai, further enhances the transportation network in the area. Notably, NH-32 and NH-36 are interconnected by National Highway 136B, which passes through Mayiladuthurai, serving as a crucial link between these two highways.

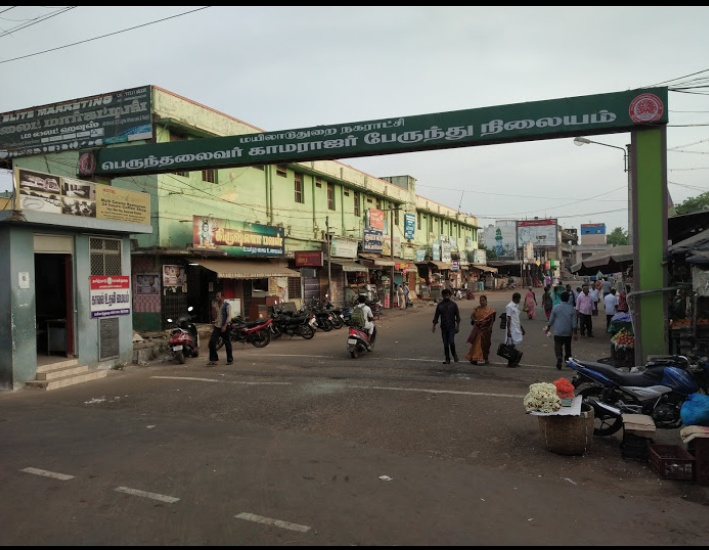
Mayiladuthurai Bus Station

As of 2007, Mayiladuthurai municipality contained 87.54 km (54.39 mi) of roads: 5.6 km (3.5 mi) of cement roads, 75.8 km (47.1 mi) of bituminous roads, 3.46 km (2.15 mi) of water-bound macadam (WBM) roads, and 2.6 km (1.6 mi) of earthen roads. Additionally, there were 20.85 km (12.96 mi) of highways in the town. In 2026, the new bus terminus facility began operations, featuring 28 bus bays, 49 shops, and restaurants, frequent shuttle services are provided between the new terminus and the existing bus stands. There are regular bus services to important cities in Tamil Nadu. There are also regular services to other South Indian cities such as Chennai, Coimbatore, Madurai, Bengaluru, and Pondicherry. Mayiladuthurai forms a part of the Tamil Nadu State Transport Corporation which is headquartered at Kumbakonam. In February 2026, the foundation stone for the Mayiladuthurai bypass road was laid, with an estimated cost of ₹185 crore.

=== By rail ===
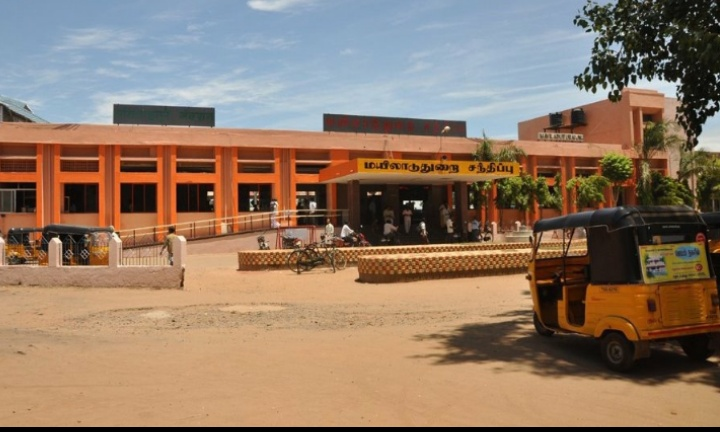
Mayiladuthurai Junction

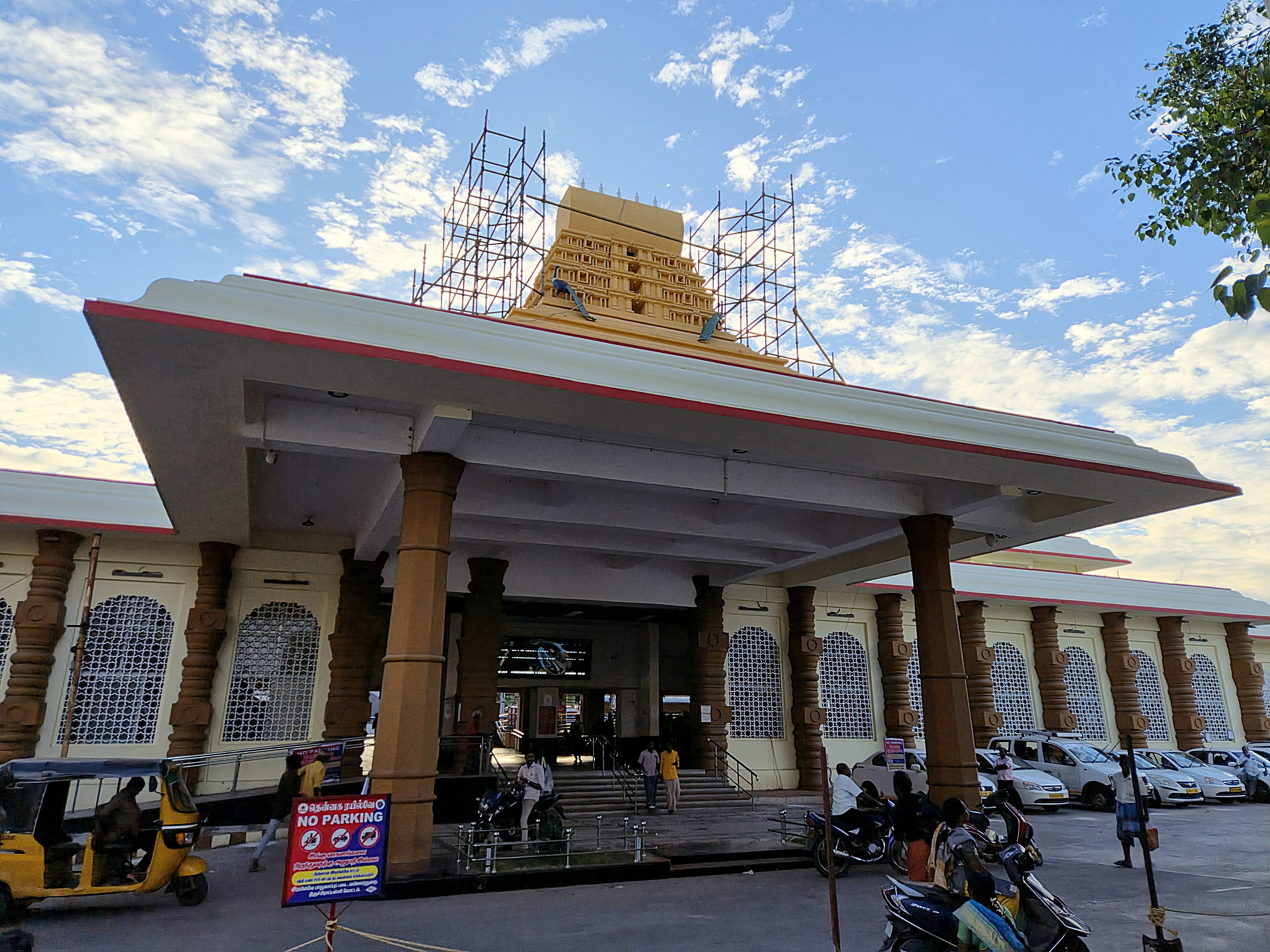
Mayiladuthurai Junction year 2026

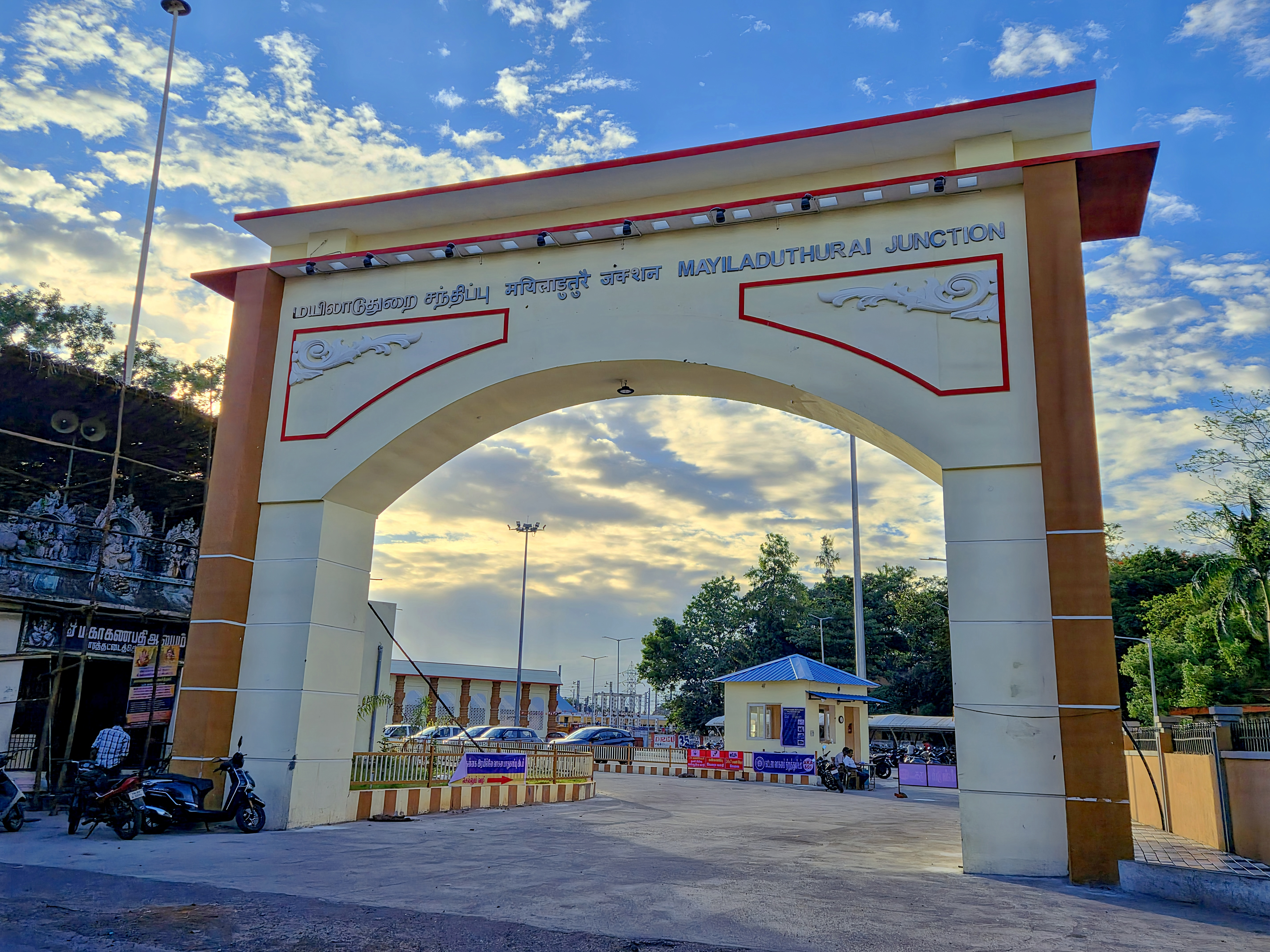
Mayiladuthurai Junction Arch

Mayiladuthurai Junction is a crucial railway station in Tamil Nadu. It in the Southern Railway's Tiruchirappalli division, located on the Main line connecting the state capital Chennai with Tiruchirappali. With five platforms, it connects major cities such as Chennai, Thanjavur, and Karaikudi, handling both passenger and freight traffic, including services to Karaikal port. The station currently manages 79 trains, with 21 originating and 21 terminating, and hosts long-distance trains such as the Rameswaram Ayodhya Cantonment Express, Mannargudi Bhagat Ki Kothi SF Express, Banaras Rameswaram Weekly SF Express, Mysuru–Mayiladuthurai Mail Express, Cholan Super Fast Express, Padmini Express and Mayiladuthurai–Coimbatore Jan Shatabdi Express. There are regular express trains that connect the city with major cities in the state such as Chennai, Coimbatore, Madurai, and Tiruchirappalli. There are passenger trains that connect Mayiladuthurai with Thanjavur, Tiruchirapalli, Thiruvarur, Karaikkal, Nagapattinam, Chidambaram, Cuddalore, Karaikal, Mannargudi, Karaikudi, Rameshwaram and Viluppuram.

=== By air ===
The closest airport is Tiruchirappalli International Airport (TRZ), approximately 136 km (85 mi) away, offering domestic and international flights. Next is Pondicherry Airport (PNY), about 114 km (71 mi) from Mayiladuthurai, mainly serving domestic routes. A major international hub, Chennai International Airport (MAA) lies 250 km (155 mi) away, connecting globally. Lastly, Madurai Airport (IXM), around 275 km (171 mi) distant, provides domestic and some international options.

== Culture ==
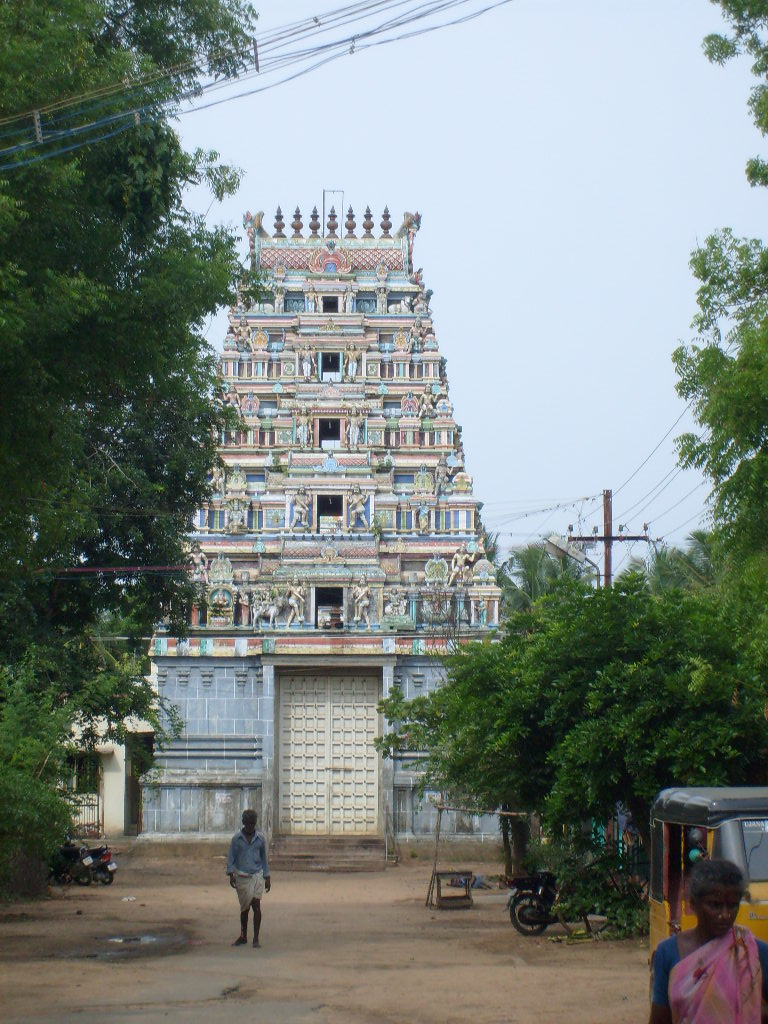
Entrance to the Dakshinamoorthi temple in Mayiladuthurai

Mayiladuthurai has several ancient temples, such as Mayuranathaswami Temple, a prominent Shaivite shrine and Parimala Ranganatha Perumal Temple, a Vaishnavite shrine on the northern banks of the Cauvery River, it is one of the Divya desam, and also forms a part of Pancha rangam which are located in the city.

The Mayuranathaswami Temple complex was built during the time of the Medieval Cholas. The annual chariot festival at the Mayuranathaswami Temple is a major event, drawing thousands of devotees. Other important festivals celebrated at the temple are Navarathri, Adi Pooram, Avani Moolam, Karthigai Deepam, and Vaikashi Brahmavotsavam. A yearly dance festival, on the pattern of the Chidambaram Natyanjali festival, called the Mayura Natyanjali is conducted within the precincts of the Mayuranathaswami Temple by the Saptasvarangal Trust during Maha Shivaratri.

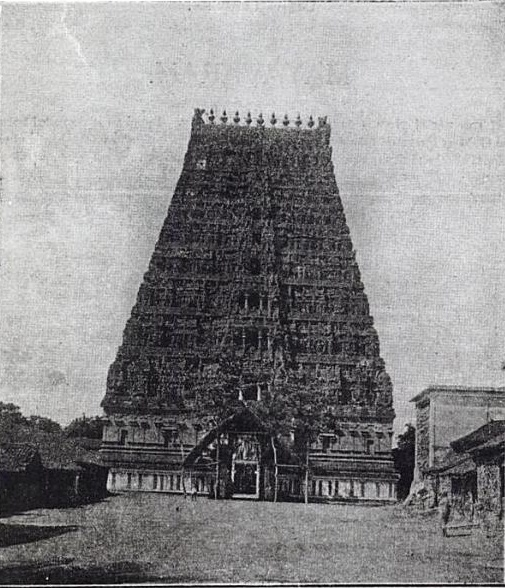
Gopuram of Mayuranathaswami Temple, photographed in 1920

The festival of holi bath known as "Muzhukku" in the river Cauvery is celebrated every year in the month of October (from the first day of the month of Aippasi to the first day of Karthigai) Mudavan Muzhukku / Kadai Muzhuku/ Thula Snana is the most celebrated festival on the Cauvery River at the Thula Gattam. It is believed by the devotees that taking a dip in the Cauvery during the Thulam Snanam period is like taking a dip in the River Ganges and other holy rivers.

The town is also known for religious festivals such as "Cauvery Pushkaram" or "Kaveri Pushkaram" (Thula festival), a celebration similar to the kumbha melas of northern India. During the month of Aippasi (Ashvina), pilgrims bathe in the Cauvery River at the Thula Kattam (Tula Ghat) in Mayiladuthurai to cleanse themselves of their sins.

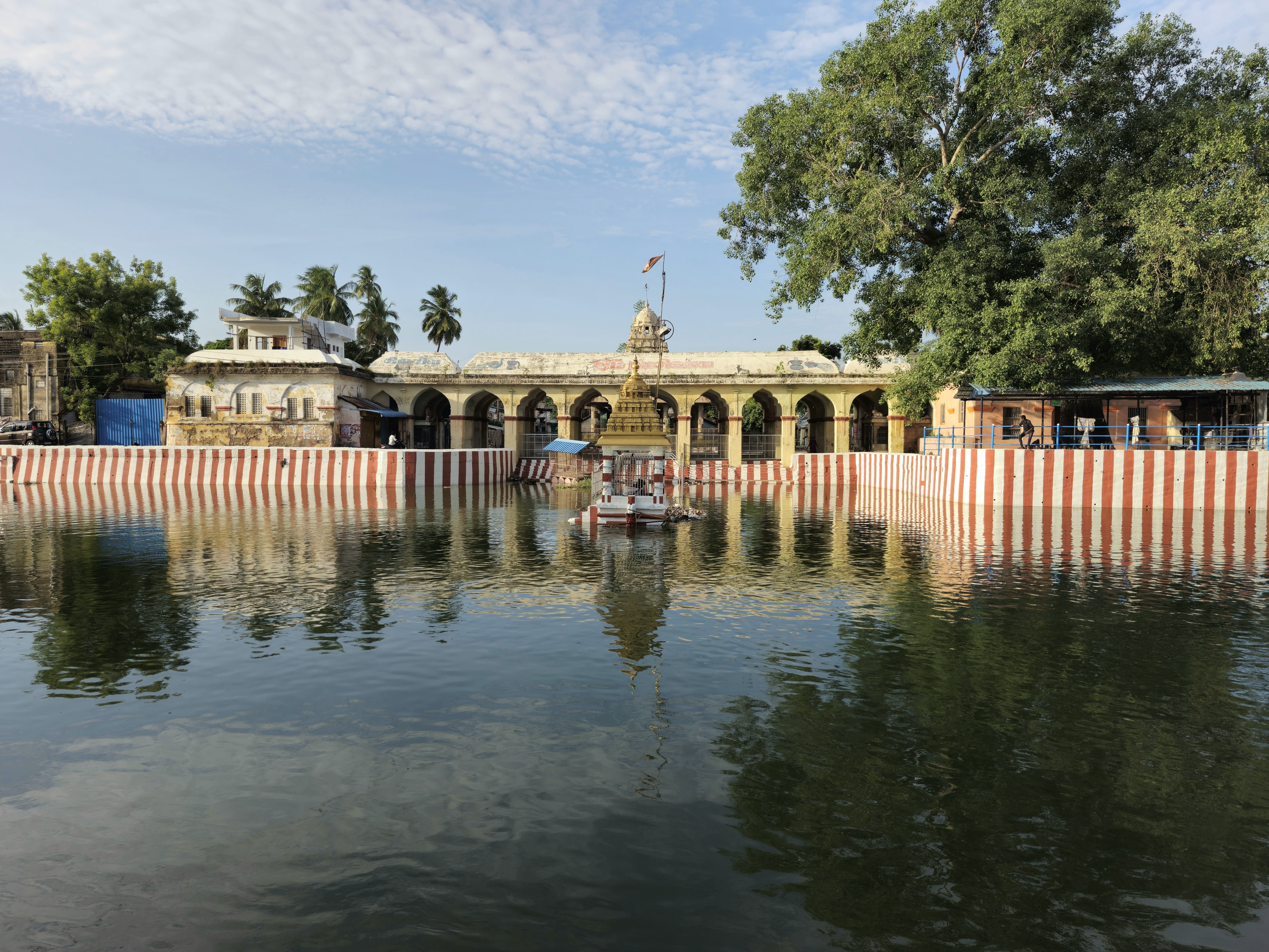
Thula Kattam during full flow of the Cauvery River in 2025

The Vadaranyeswarar Temple and Kailasanathar Temple in Utthara Mayuram, the Tulagattam Kashivishwanathar Temple, the Padithurai Vishwanathar Temple, the Aiyaarappar Temple, and the Punukeeswarar Temple at Koranad, Mayiladuthurai, are other important ancient Shiva temples in Mayiladuthurai. The Adhi Ranganathar Temple, and Kolikutti Vanamutti Perumal Temple are other important Vishnu temples in Mayiladuthurai. According to local folklore, Mayiladuthurai was associated with Hindu holy men called "siddhars". To this day, a neighbourhood of Mayiladuthurai is called Siddharkaadu.

== Tourist attractions ==
The Navagraha temples, Poompuhar, Tranquebar or Tharangambadi, the mangroves of Pichavaram, Tirumullaivasal, Pazhaiyar near Sirkali, not to be confused with the Palaiyar, and Karaikal are some of the most prominent tourist attractions located around the town. The Navagraha temples are also among the most popular pilgrimage sites and attractions. Six out of nine temples are closely located within a 30 km (19 mi) radius from Mayiladuthurai.

== Notable people ==
The following people were either born in or were connected to Mayiladuthurai, in Tamil Nadu, India, in alphabetical order by last name

- Viswanathan Anand – An Indian chess grandmaster and five-time World Chess Champion. He became the first grandmaster from India. In 2008 he has been awarded with Padma Vibhushan, second highest civilian award in India.
- G. N. Balasubramaniam – A Carnatic vocalist, known for his contribution to classical music.
- Gopalakrishna Bharathi - A Tamil poet and a composer of Carnatic music who composed the Tamil musical opera Nandanar Charitram.
- M. K. Thyagaraja Bhagavathar – An actor, singer, and composer.
- Madurai Mani Iyer - A carnatic music singer and vocalists.
- Sa. Kandasamy – A novelist and documentary film-maker.
- Kambar – A poet and the author of the Ramayana in the Tamil language, popularly known as Kambaramayanam.
- N. Kittappa - An Indian politician and former Member of Tamil Nadu legislative assembly from Mayuram constituency
- Kalki Krishnamoorthy – An author who wrote historical romances in Tamil such as Ponniyin Selvan and Sivagamiyin Sabatham. Kalki was the founder of Kalki magazine.
- Samuel Vedhanaygam Pillai – An Indian civil servant, Tamil poet, novelist and social worker. He is remembered for authoring Prathapa Mudaliar Charithram, recognized as the "first modern Tamil novel".
- P. Govindasamy Pillai – A businessman and philanthropist in Singapore.
- Nadaswaram Vidwan T.N. Rajarathinam – An Indian Carnatic musician, nadaswaram maestro, vocalist and film actor.
- R. D. Rajasekhar – A cinematographer who predominantly works in films of Indian languages such as Tamil, Malayalam, Telugu, and Hindi..
- T. Rajendar – A Tamil filmmaker, actor, and lyricist.
- T. R. Venkatarama Sastri – A lawyer and politician who served as the Advocate-General for Madras Presidency.
- Raghavan Seetharaman – Former CEO of Doha Bank, Qatar.
- M.S. Udhayamoorthy – A Tamil writer and social activist. Author of several books on self-improvement.
- S. R. D. Vaidyanathan – A musician who played the nadaswaram.

== See also ==
- Kaveri Pushkaram
- Koorainadu Punukeeswarar Temple
