= Thirupuvanam =

Thirupuvanam may refer to:

- Thirupuvanam, Thanjavur
- Thirupuvanam, Sivaganga
