= Kampaheswarar Temple, Thirubuvanam =

Shiva temple in Tamil Nadu, India

Kampaheswarar Temple
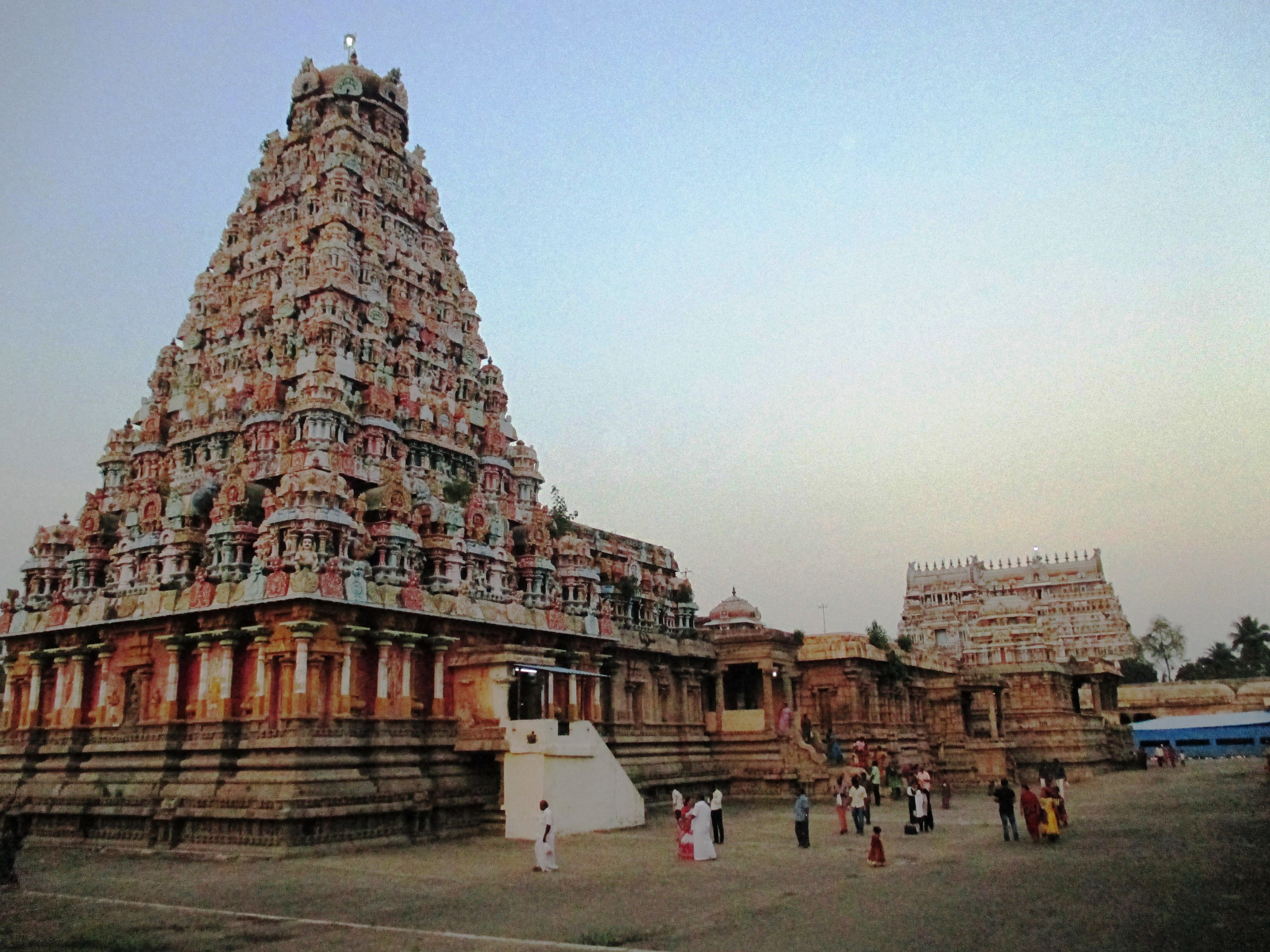

- Location in Tamil Nadu

Religion
- Affiliation: Hinduism
- District: Thanjavur
- Deity: Kampaheswarar (Shiva); Dharmasamvarthini(Ambal)

Location
- Location: Thirubuvanam
- State: Tamil Nadu
- Country: India
- Coordinates: 10°59′24″N 79°26′00″E

Architecture
- Type: Dravidian architecture

The Kampaheswarar Temple or kampa-hara-ishvarar ( kampa-hareswarar ) is a Hindu temple dedicated to the god Shiva. It is situated in Thirubuvanam, a village in Thanjavur district in the South Indian State of Tamil Nadu, on the Mayiladuthurai-Kumbakonam road. Shiva is worshiped as "Kampahareswarar" as he removed the quaking (Skt. Kampa) of a king who was being haunted by a Brahmarakshasa. It was built by Kulothunga Chola III and is considered the last of the four masterpieces built during the Medieval Chola era.

The temple has a shrine for Sharabha, a depiction of Shiva, a part-lion and part-bird beast in Hindu mythology, who, according to Sanskrit literature, is eight-legged and more powerful than a lion or an elephant, possessing the ability to clear a valley in one jump. The temple is considered in the line of Brihadisvara Temple at Thanjavur, Gangaikonda Cholapuram temple and Airavatesvara temple, with the trio forming the Great Living Chola Temples.

== Legend ==
As per Hindu legend, Shiva is believed to have relieved Kampa (quaking) of a king haunted by evil spirits on account of the king killing a Brahmin by mistake. This led to the name of Kampahareshvara. As per another legend, Shiva is believed to have assumed the form to quench the fury of Narasimha, an avatar of Vishnu.

== Vaippu Sthalam ==
It is one of the shrines of the Vaippu Sthalams sung by Tamil Saivite Nayanar Appar.

== History ==
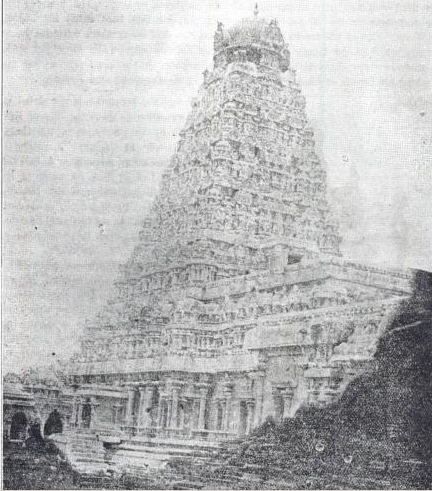
The central shrine of the Kampaheswarar Temple

As per inscriptions found in the south wall of the temple, the shrine was constructed by the Chola king Kulothunga Chola III as a memorial of his successful North Indian campaign. The inscriptions indicate the contribution towards the construction of the Nataraja shrine and the mukhamandapa. Some of the other temples that figure in the inscriptions are the Nataraja Temple in Chidambaram, the Ekambareswarar Temple at Kanchipuram, the Meenakshi Temple at Madurai, the Mahalingeswarar Temple at Thiruvidamaruthur and the Brihadisvara Temple at Thanjavur. The inscriptions in the shrine of the presiding deity is similar to the one in the outer gopuram (gateway tower), which indicates the building of the temple by Kulottunga-Choladeva. While it is unclear which Kulottunga it is, scholars have placed it at 1176 CE, which is closer to the reign of Kulothunga Chola III, who is believed to have been the last powerful Chola king. There are four inscriptions from Kulothunga Chola in Grantha script. The inscription 189 of 1907, the one on the southern wall of the central shrine, is damaged and mentions Arya Sri-Somanatha. Inscription 190 on the same wall indicates the building operations of Kulothunga Chola. 191, at the entrance of outer gopura, is a duplicate of the 190. On the same gopura, inscription 192 indicates record of king Kulothunga Chola. There are two inscriptions in Tamil from the period of Jatavarman Tribuvanachakravarthin Parakrama Pandyadeva registered by Epigraphy Department in 1911. One of them, 159, registers a contract between the residents of Tribhuvanavirapuram and Kulamangalanadu, who were urkaval (watchmen) of the village. On the same wall, the inscription numbered 160, records a similar contract in the presence of chief Udaiyar Kulasekharadeva.

== Architecture ==
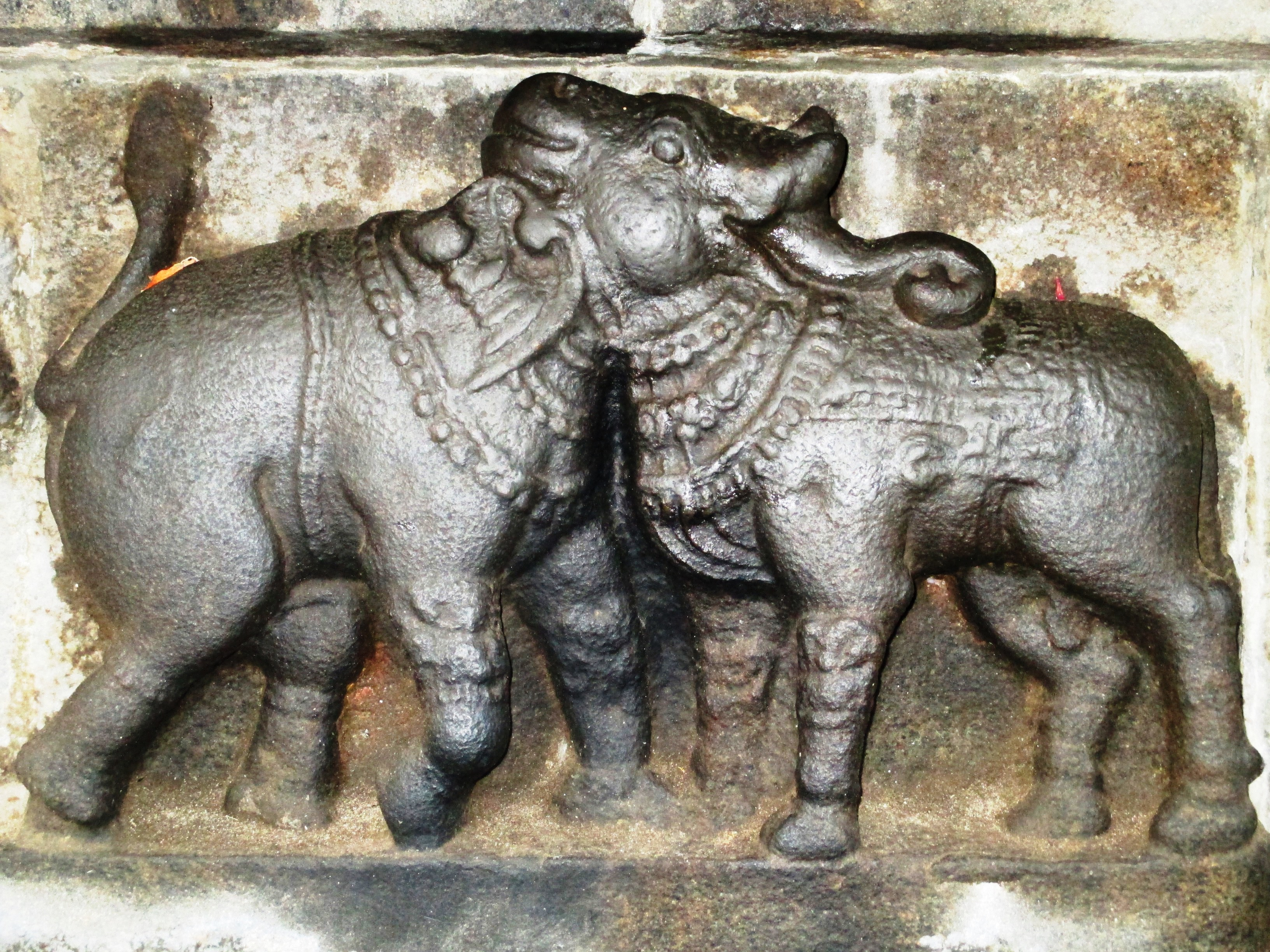
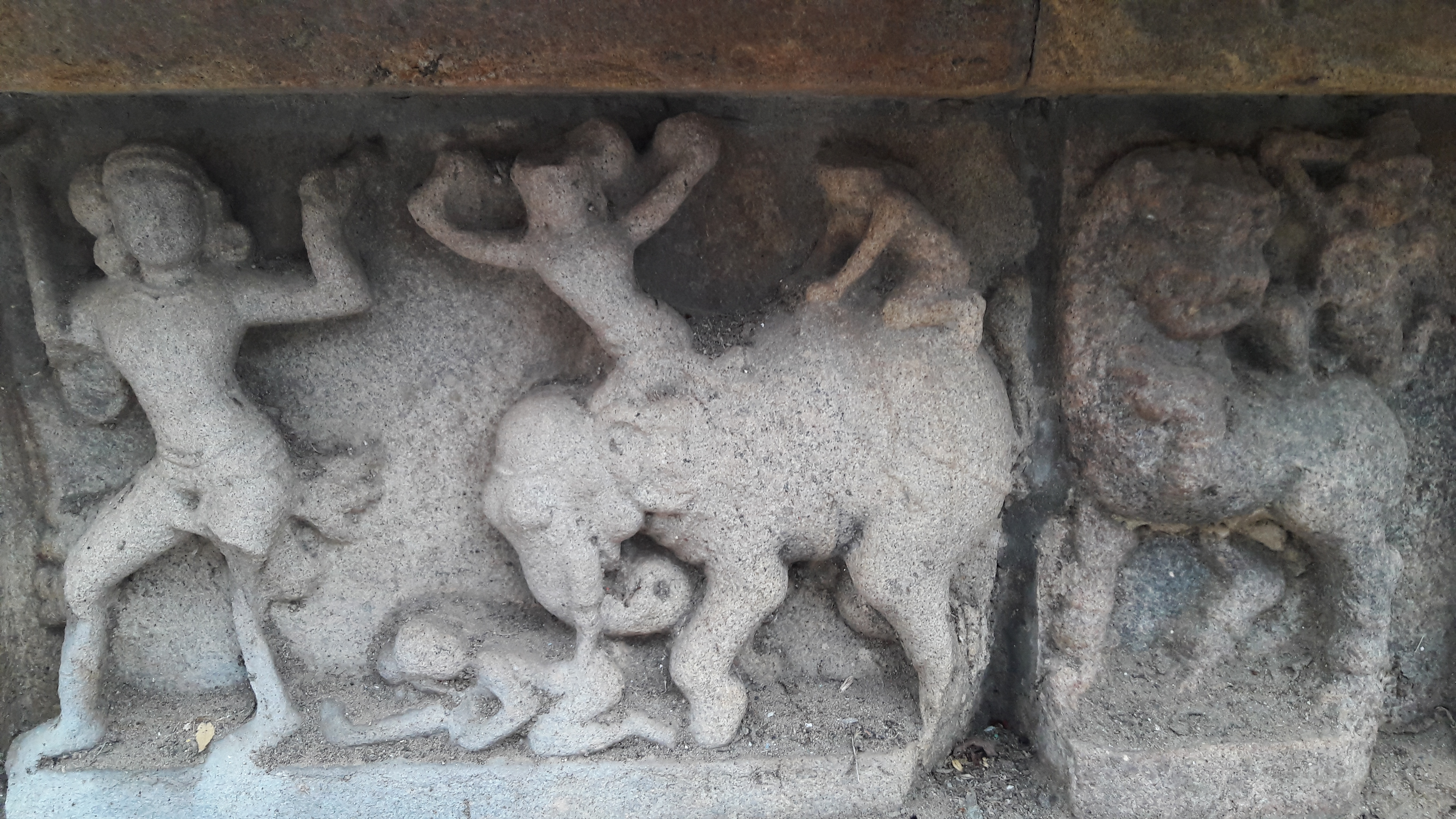
Sculptures in the panels of the temple

The temple is in Thirubuvanam, a village in Thanjavur district in the South Indian State of Tamil Nadu, on the Mayiladuthurai-Kumbakonam road. It follows the Dravidian style of architecture. Its vimana is extremely high compared with other Dravidian-style South Indian temples. The temple's architecture is similar to that of the Big Temple at Thanjavur, Airavatesvara Temple at Darasuram and Gangaikonda Cholapuram temples. The distinct features of all the temples is the vimana, the structure over the sanctum, being taller than the gateway tower, which is an unusual feature in Tamil temples. There is a separate shrine for Sarabeswarar and a metal icon of the same deity within the sanctum, which has fine artistic work. Yali, a mythical creature with the face of a lion, otherwise considered a symbol of Nayak architecture, has its earliest representation in Chola art in the temple. The temple was built by the Kulottunga Chola III of the Later Cholas, who ruled between 1176–1218 AD of the 13th century. The two circular pilasters with circular shafts on four sides of the vimana indicate the temple's antiquity, and is possibly termed Vrittasputitas in silpa texts like Shilparatna. This feature is found only in a few other temples like Neyyadiappar Temple, Tillaistanam, Tiruttalinathar Temple in Thiruputhur, the central shrine in Moovar Koil in Kodumbalur, Vijayalaya Choleeswaram in Narthamalai, and Anantheswara temple in Udayarkudi.

== Complex ==
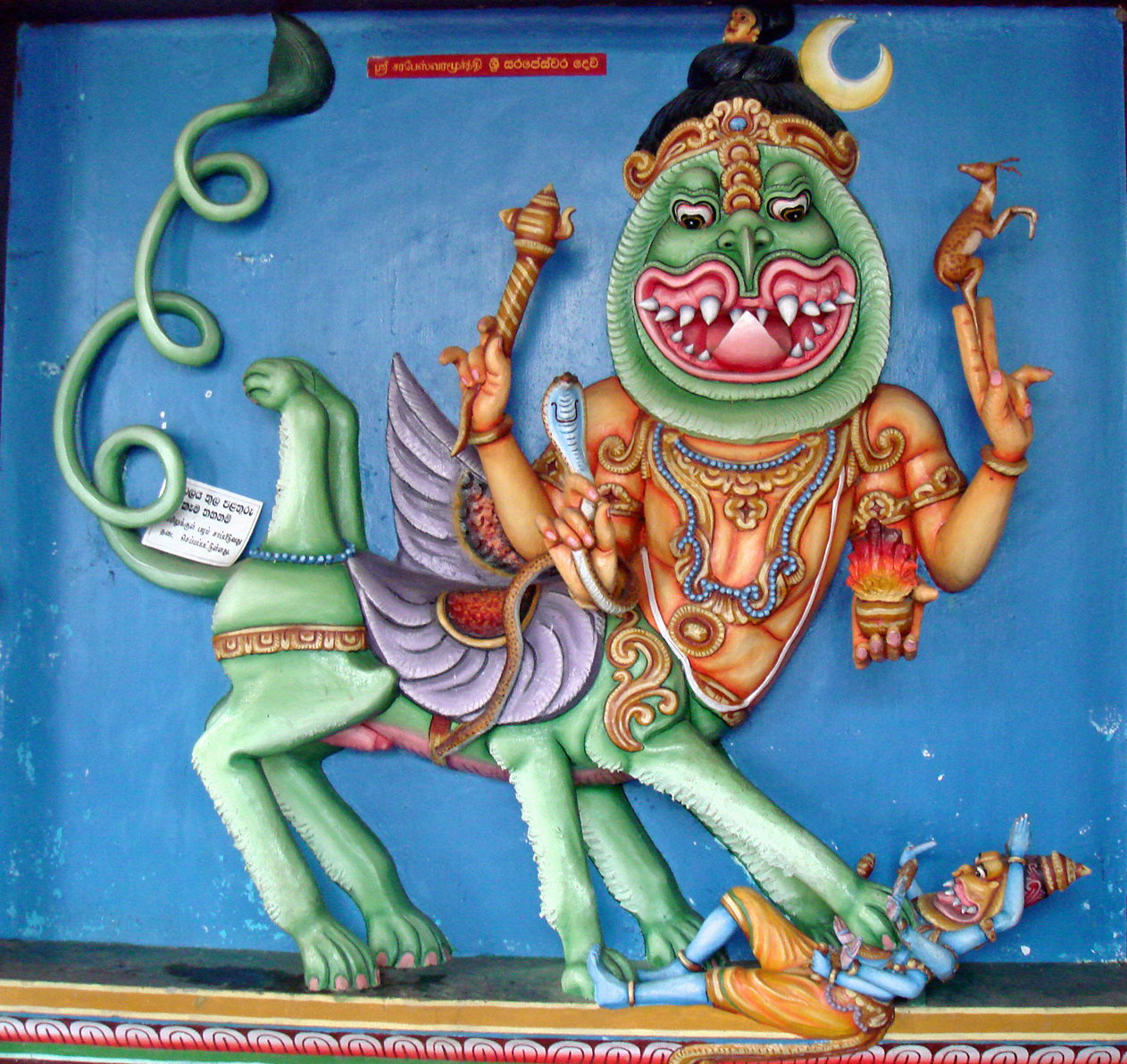
Image of Sarabeswarar

The temple is approached through a five-tiered pyramidal rajagopuram, the original structure, according to Sarkar, is from Kuluthonga's regime. The vimana, the shrine over the sanctum is axial and of same height of that of the gopuram. The temple's gopuram is similar to its counterparts at Thyagaraja Temple, Tiruvarur, Someswarar Temple, Pazhayarai and Nageswaraswamy Temple, Kumbakonam, which all belong to the same period. The presiding deity of the temple is Shiva lingam in the form of Kampaheswarar and is housed in the central shrine.

There is a separate shrine for the deity Sarabeswarar, a fusion of man, eagle and lion, who is believed to have relieved the devas (celestial deities) from the fury of Vishnu in the form of Narasimha after he slayed Hiranyakasipu. Sharbeshwaramurti is depicted with six legs, the body and face of a lion, and a tail. It has four human arms, with an axe held in the right upper hand, a noose in the lower right hand, a deer in the upper left hand, and fire in the lower left hand. Narasimha is shown with eight arms, flailing and struggling under Sharbeshwaramurti's feet. The shrine also has sculptures of Sridevi and Bhudevi, the consorts of Vishnu. The bronze image of Sarabheswara temple is believed to be from the period of Kulothunga Chola III.

== Gallery ==
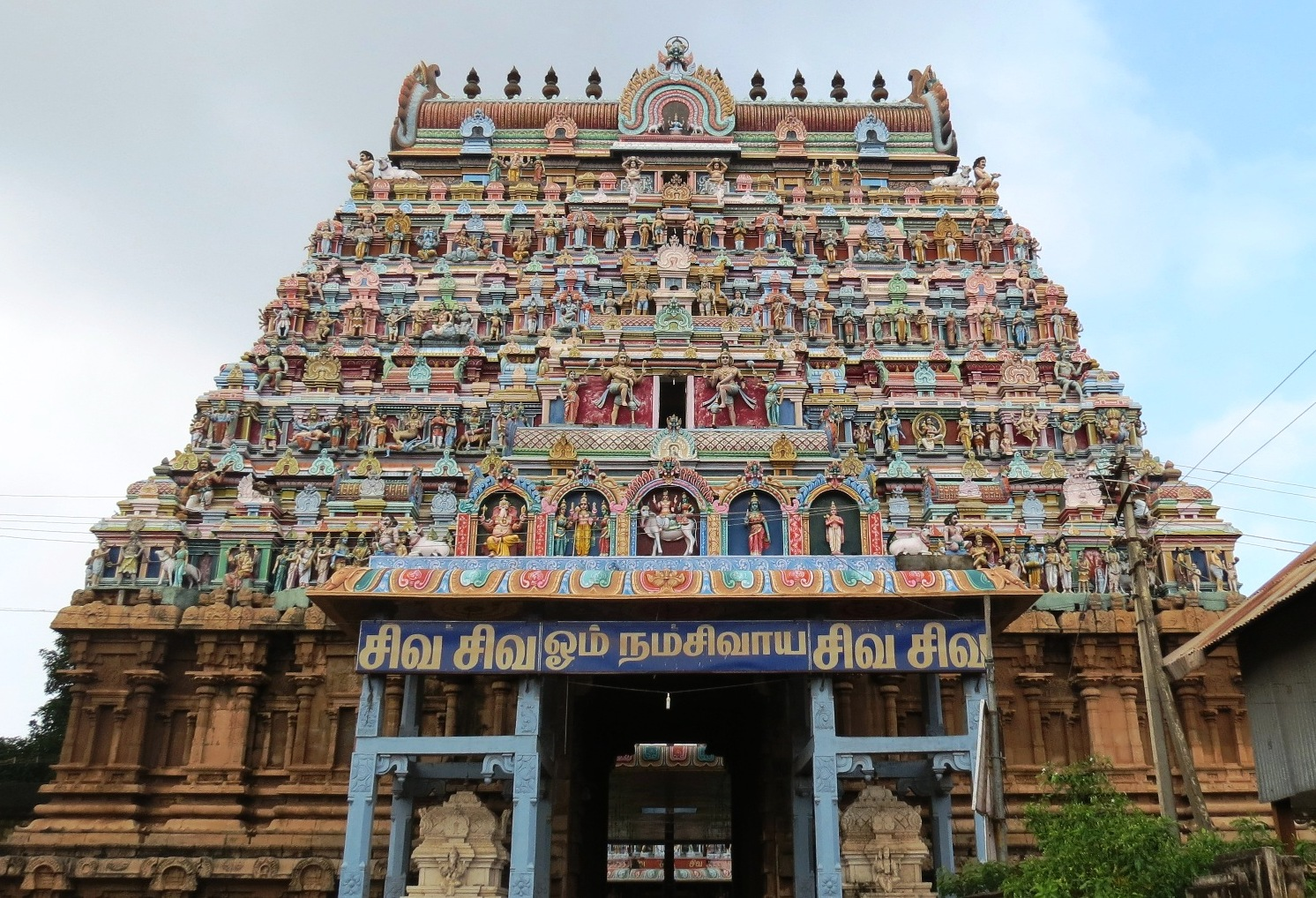
Main entrance and Rajagopura

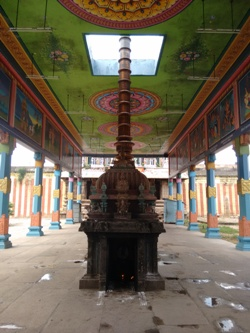
Dwajasthambam

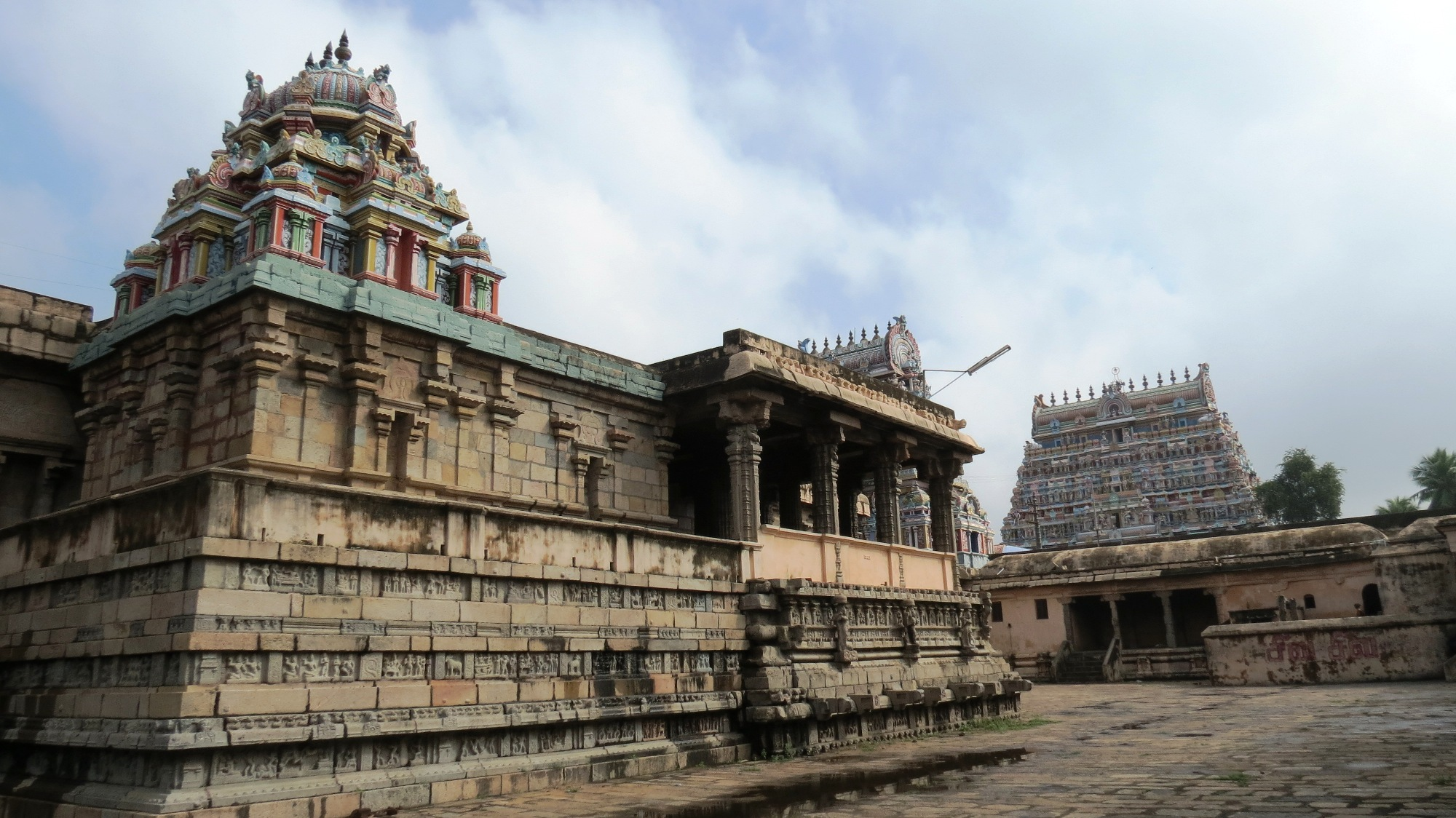
Outer prakara

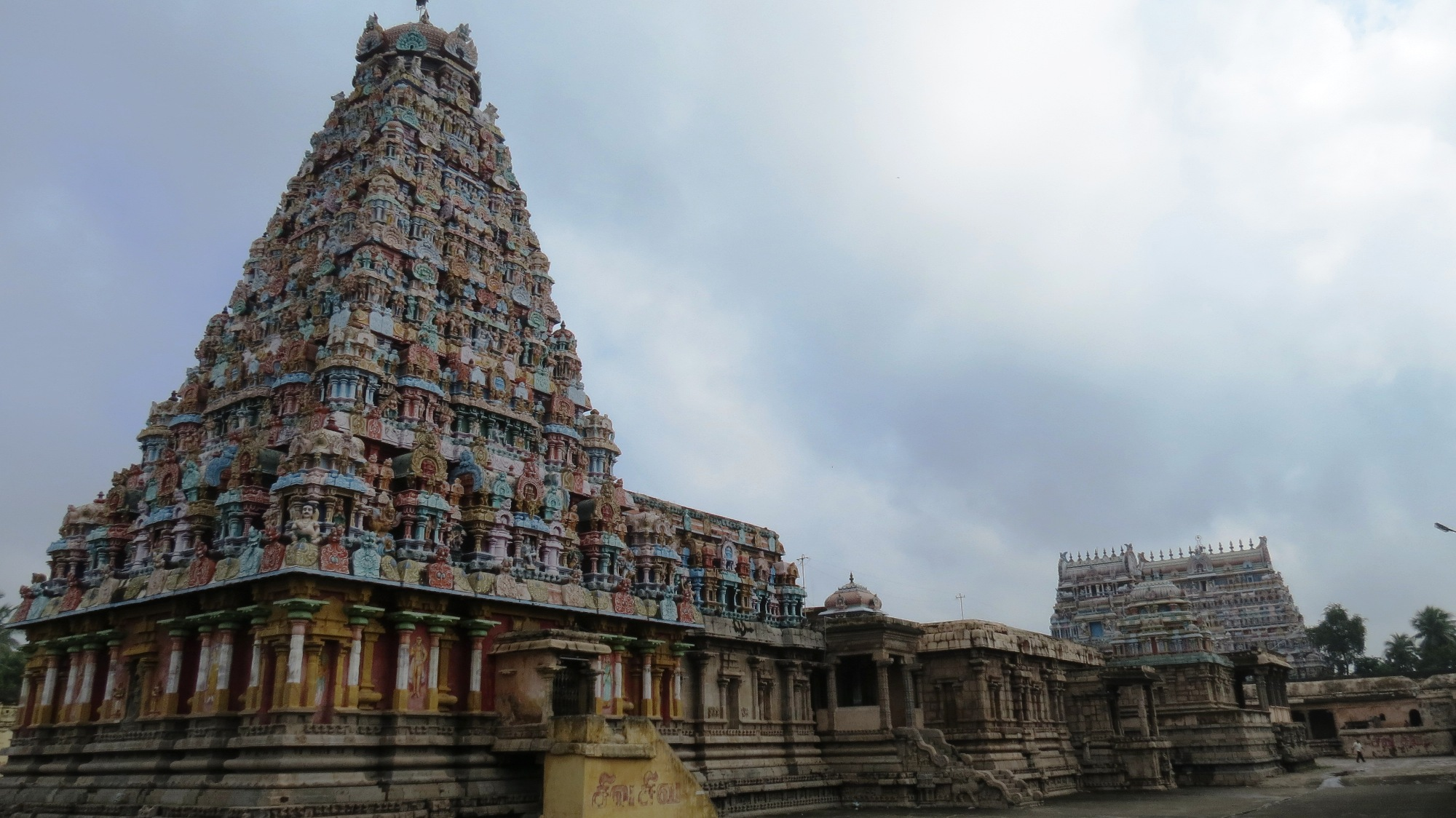
Vimana

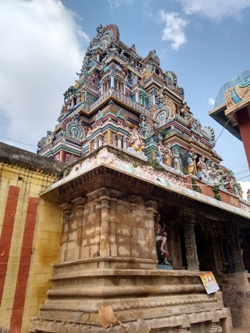
Inner gopura

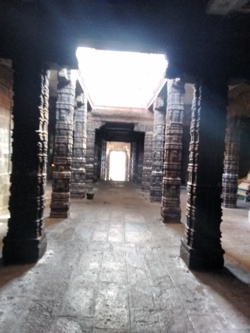
Pillars in the mandapa

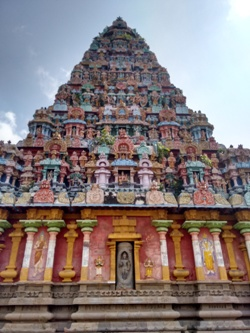
Vimana rear view
