= Airavatesvara Temple =

12th-century Chola Hindu temple in Tamil Nadu, India

- ஐராவதேசுவரர் கோயில்
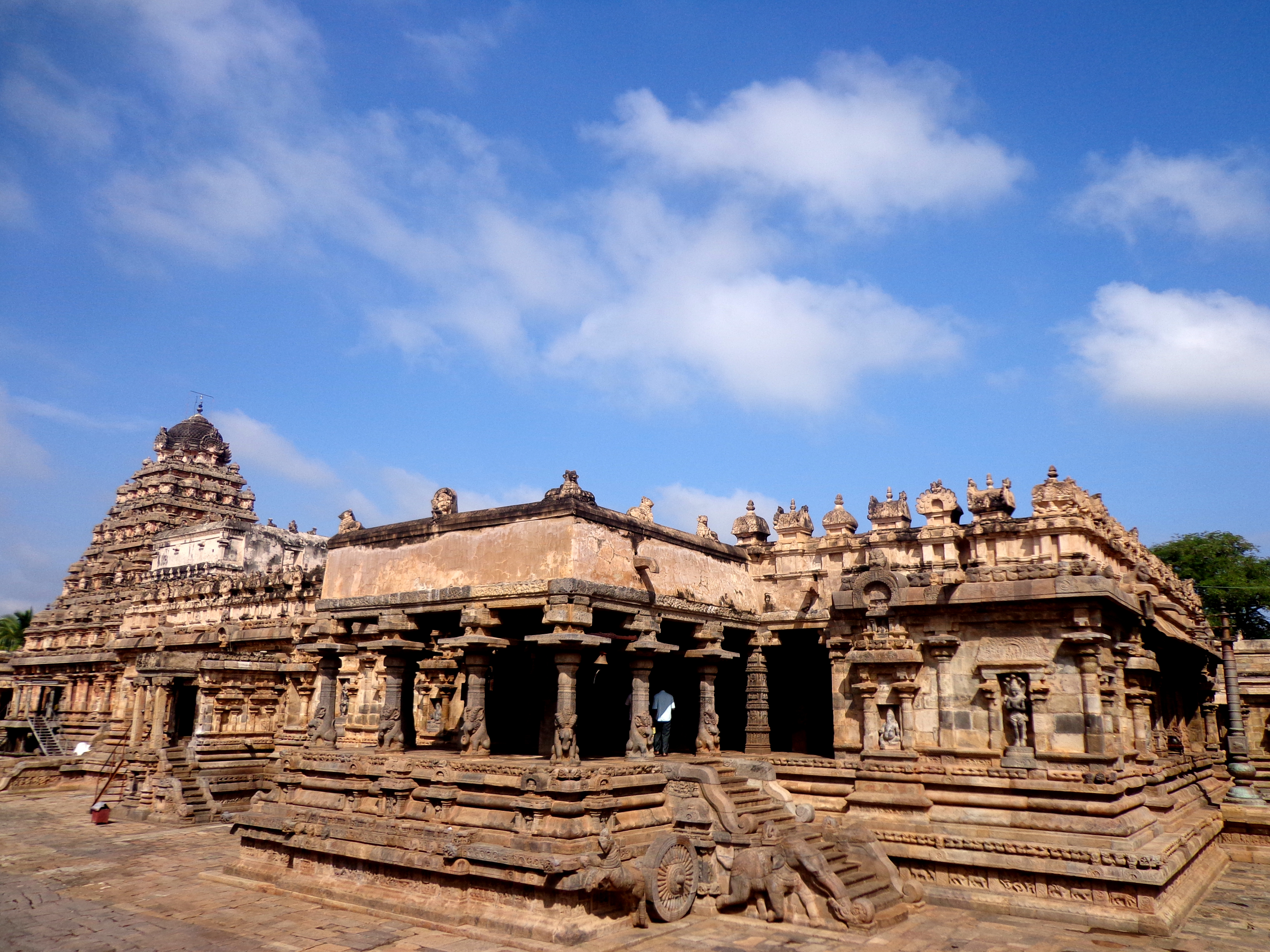
- The main temple

- Location in Tamil Nadu Location in India

Religion
- Affiliation: Hinduism
- Deity: Shiva

Location
- Location: Kumbakonam, India
- Coordinates: 10°56′54″N 79°21′24″E

Architecture
- Creator: Rajaraja II
- Completed: 12th century AD
- Inscriptions: Tamil

UNESCO World Heritage Site
- Part of: Great Living Chola Temples
- Criteria: Cultural: (ii), (iii)
- Reference: 250-003
- Inscription: 1987 (11th Session)
- Extensions: 2004

Airavatesvara Temple is a Hindu temple of Chola architecture located in Darasuram, a suburb of Kumbakonam, Thanjavur District in the South Indian state of Tamil Nadu. This temple, built by Chola emperor Rajaraja II in the 12th century CE is a UNESCO World Heritage Site, along with the Brihadeeswara Temple at Thanjavur, the Gangaikondacholisvaram Temple at Gangaikonda Cholapuram that are referred to as the Great Living Chola Temples.

The Airavatesvarar temple is one among a cluster of eighteen medieval era large Hindu temples in the Kumbakonam area, Thanjavur District. The temple is dedicated to Shiva. It also reverentially displays Vaishnavism and Shaktism traditions of Hinduism, along with the legends associated with Nayanmars – the Bhakti movement saints of Shaivism.

The stone temple incorporates a chariot structure, and includes major Vedic and Puranic deities such as Indra, Agni, Varuna, Vayu, Brahma, Surya, Vishnu, Saptamatrikas, Durga, Saraswati, Sri devi (Lakshmi), Ganga, Yamuna, Subrahmanya, Ganesha, Kama, Rati and others. Shiva's consort has a dedicated shrine called the Periya Nayaki Amman temple. This is a detached temple situated to the north of the Airavateshvarar temple. This might have been a part of the main temple when the outer courts were complete. At present, parts of the temple such as the gopuram is in ruins, and the main temple and associated shrines stand alone. It has two sun dials namely morning and evening sun dials which can be seen as wheels of the chariot. The temple continues to attract large gatherings of Hindu pilgrims every year during Magha, while some of the images such as those of Durga and Shiva are part of special pujas.

== Location ==
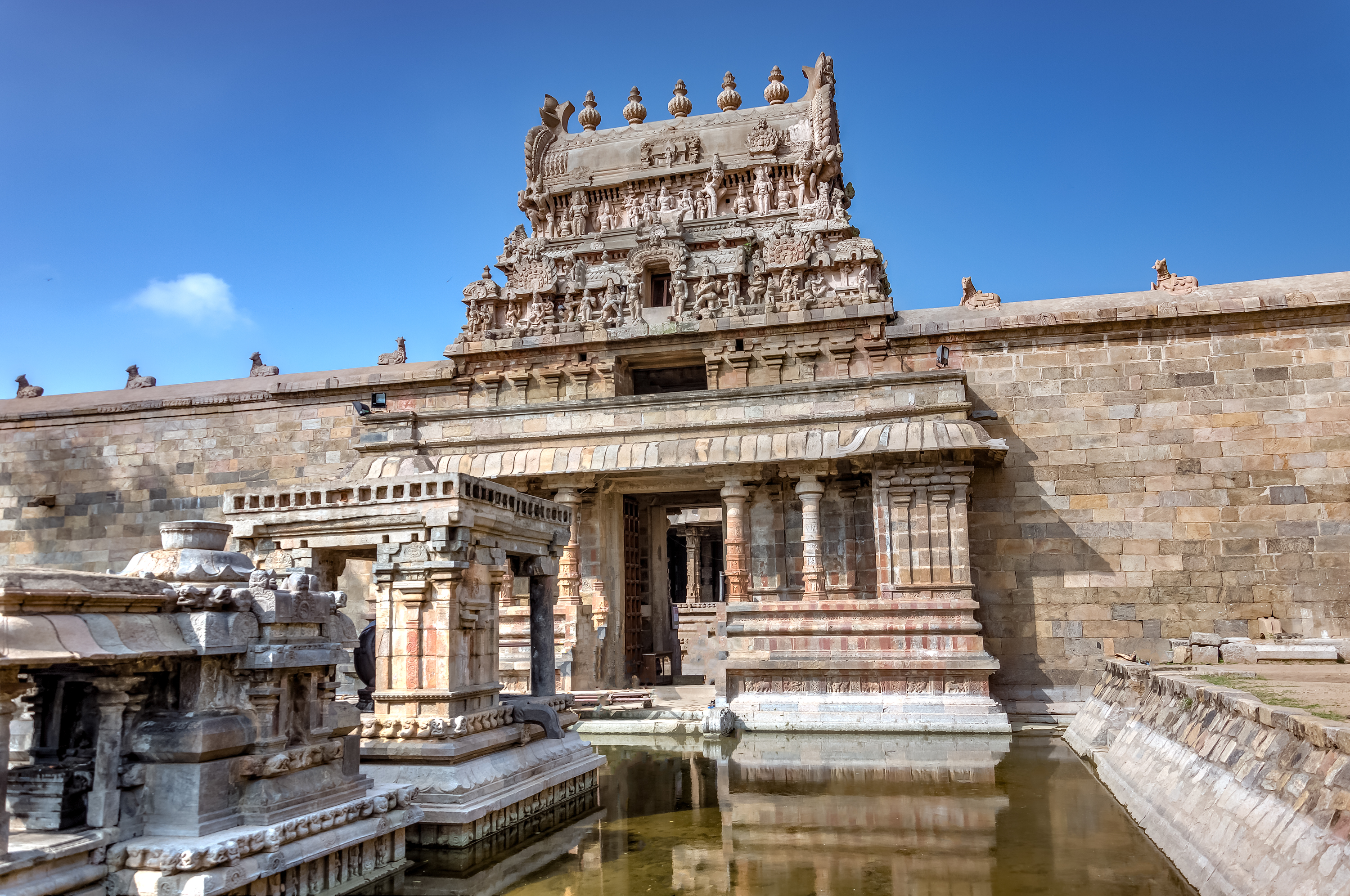
Entrance to the Airavatesvara Temple, Darasuram

The Airavatesvara Temple is located in Kumbakonam city, 310 kilometres (190 mi) southwest of Chennai and 90 kilometres (56 mi) from Chidambaram. It is about 40 kilometres (25 mi) to the northeast to the Brihadeeswara Temple in Thanjavur, and about 30 kilometres (19 mi) to the southwest of Gangaikonda Cholapuram Temple. All three are a part of the UNESCO world heritage site.

The nearest airport with regular services is Tiruchirappalli International Airport (IATA: TRZ), about 90 kilometres (56 mi) away. The temple is on highway 22 connecting Tiruchirappalli, and highway 36 connecting it to Thanjavur. The nearby cities of Tiruchirapalli and Chidambaram are connected daily to other major cities by the network of Indian Railways and Tamil Nadu bus services.

The temple though inland, is near the Kollidam River, within the Kaveri (Cauvery) delta with access to the Bay of Bengal and through it to the Indian Ocean.

== Nomenclature ==
The Airavatesvara Shiva temple has a water tank that has a connected channel that brings in water from the Cauveri River. Hindus gather annually to take a dip in the tank. The local mythology narrates how Airavata, or Indra's white elephant was restored to clean, white skin after he took a dip in this tank. This legend is carved in stone in the inner shrine, and this Indra's elephant gives this temple its name.

== Architecture ==
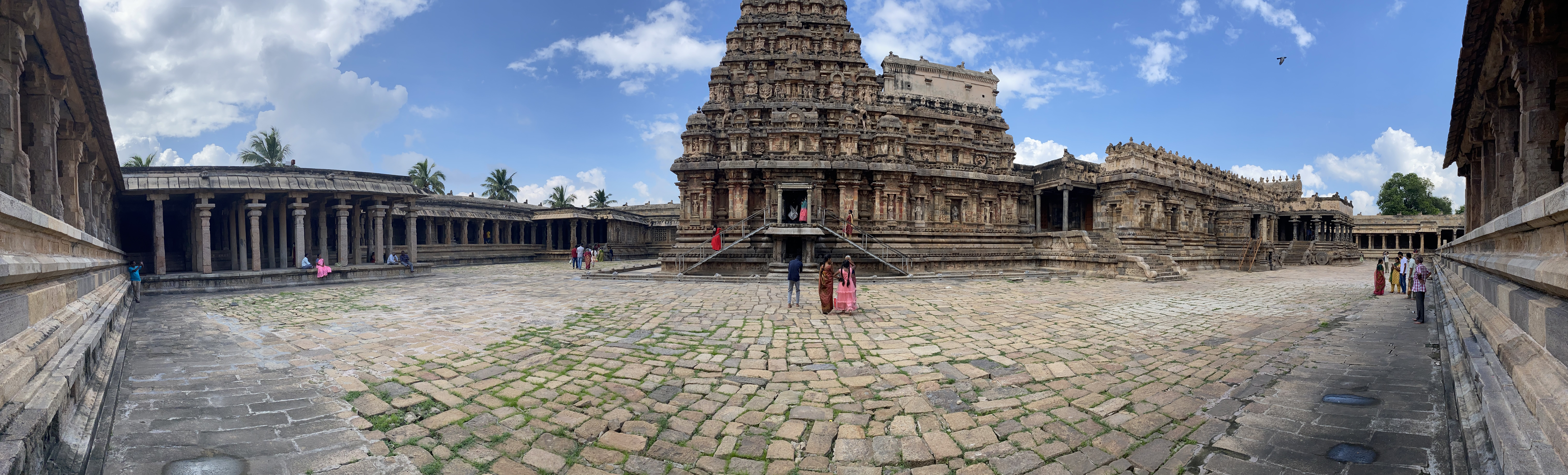
Panoramic view of the courtyard and main temple of the Airavatesvara Temple

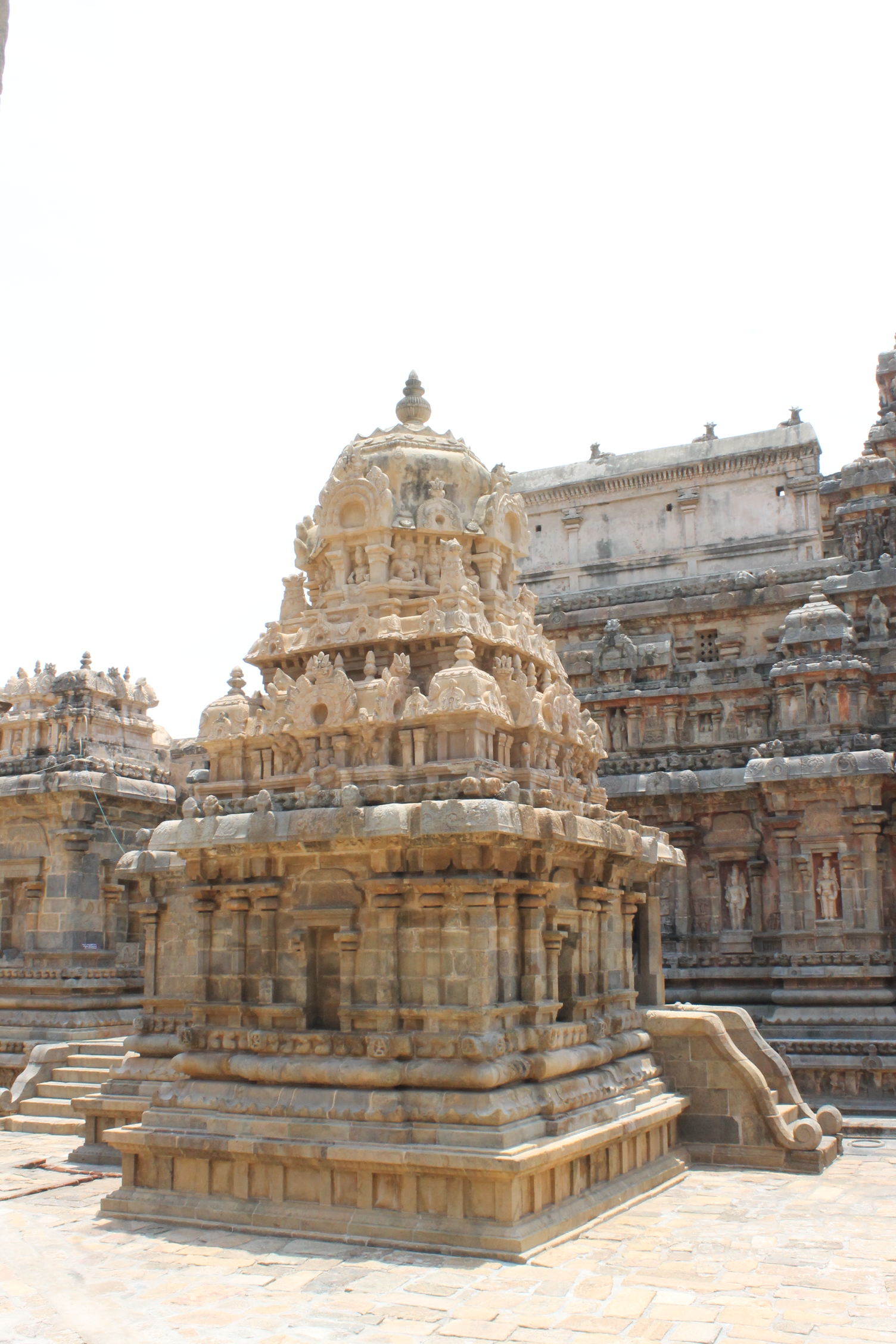
A vimana or pyramidal tower inside the Airavatesvara Temple

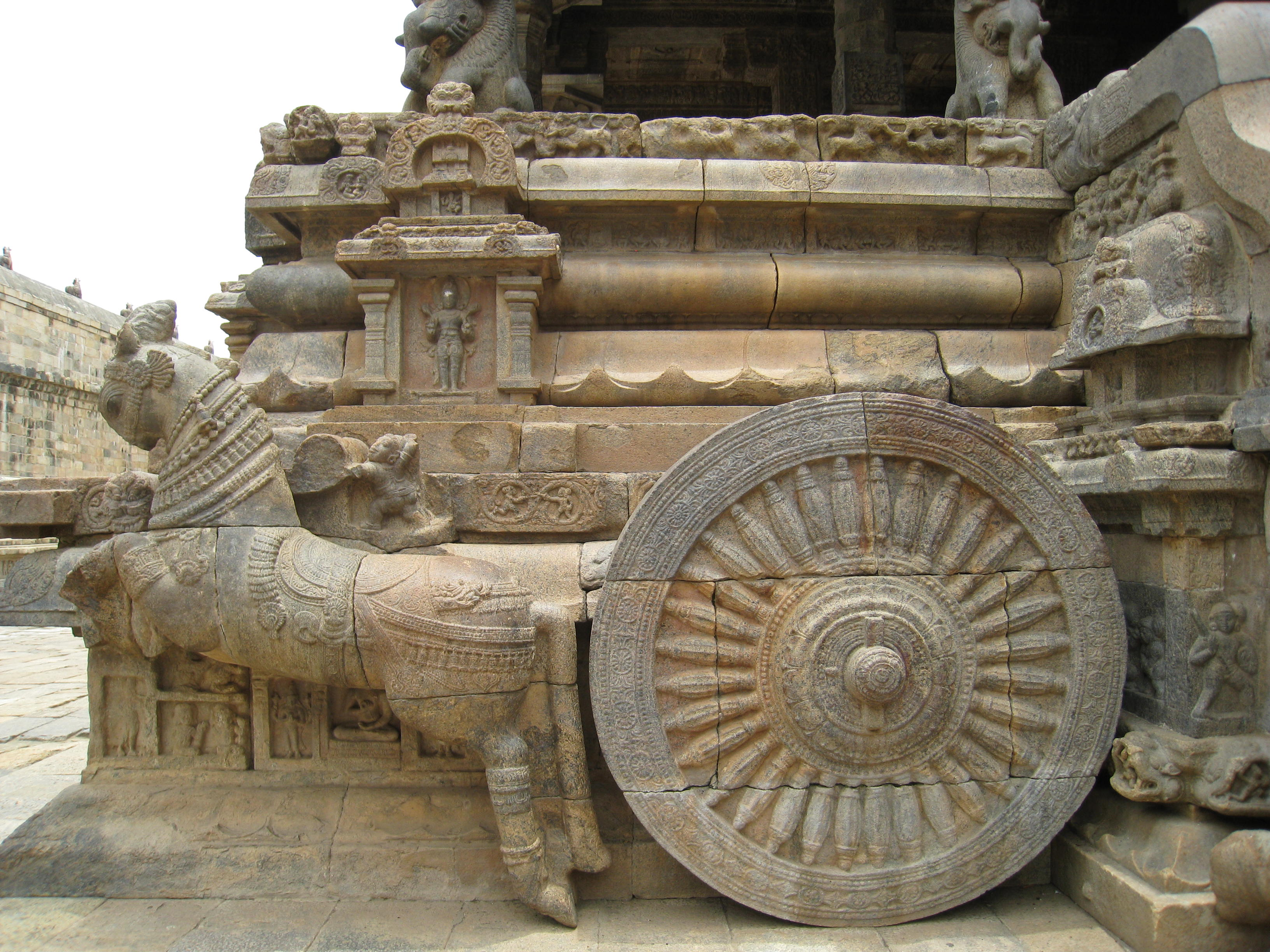
Chariot detail, Airavatesvara temple, Tamil Nadu.

The Cholas built hundreds of Hindu temples across their empire. Of these four were vast complexes with made of stone vimanas (pyramidal towers). Airavatesvara temple is one of these four temples and was built by Rajaraja II. It is classified as Karak Koil, since it was designed after chariots - vehicles which were used in processions during festivals. The other three temples are found in Thanjavur built by Rajaraja I, Gangaikonda Cholapuram built by Rajendra I, and Tribuvanam by Kulottunga II.

The Airavatesvara temple is another square plan structure completed in 1166 CE. The surviving (Note: The temple complex was seven fold larger. Much of it was destroyed in late 13th or early 14th century.) temple is enclosed by a compound wall that is approximately 107 metres (351 ft) by 70 metres (230 ft) with a nandi madapa and dhvajastambha found outside of the wall. The main temple itself sits on a plinth that is 23 meters by 63 meters, and consists of the garbhagriha (inner sanctum), and three mandapas - ardhamandapa, mukhamandapa and agramandapa.

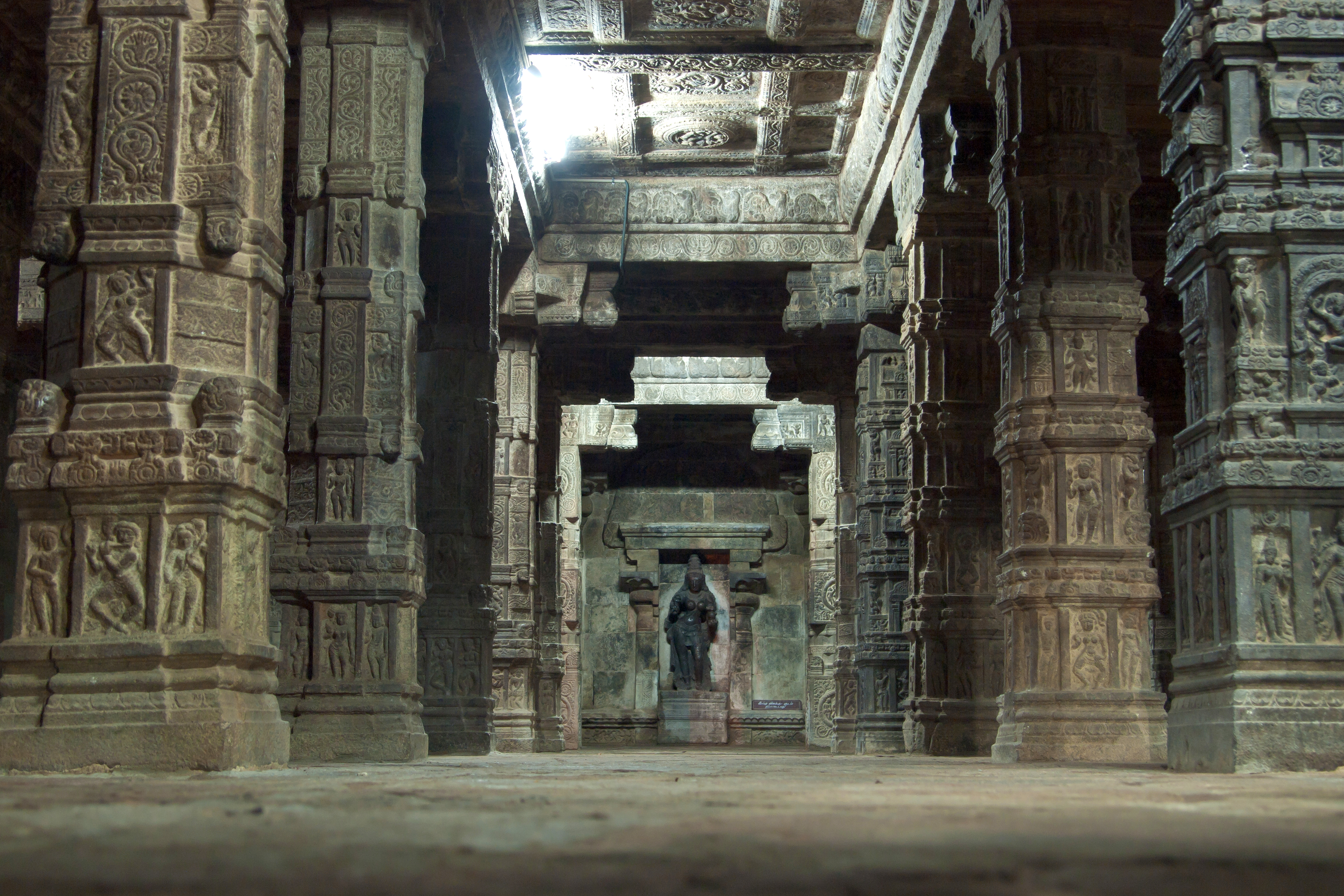
Sanctum sanctorum

The garbhagriha or inner sanctum is a 12-metre-sided (39 ft) square, with thick walls on which the vimana (pyramidal tower) rises to a height of 24 m (79 ft). There is no circumambulatory path provided immediately around the inner sanctum; rather, it is outside in the courtyard. The garbhagriha is connected to the mukhamandapa through the ardhamandapa supported on pillars and flanked by two massive dvarapalas.

The maha-mandapa is a rectangle of about 24 metres (79 ft) by 18 metres (59 ft), with six rows of right pillars (forty-eight in total). These have reliefs and intricate carvings. Towards the east of the maha mandapa is the agra mandapa also called the Rajagambhiran-tiru-mandapam after the king. The agra mandapa hall is shaped like a chariot, with stone carvings of wheels and horses. The design is similar to the Nritta-sabha (community dance hall) of the Chidambaram temple and the Konark Sun Temple near Puri, Odisha.

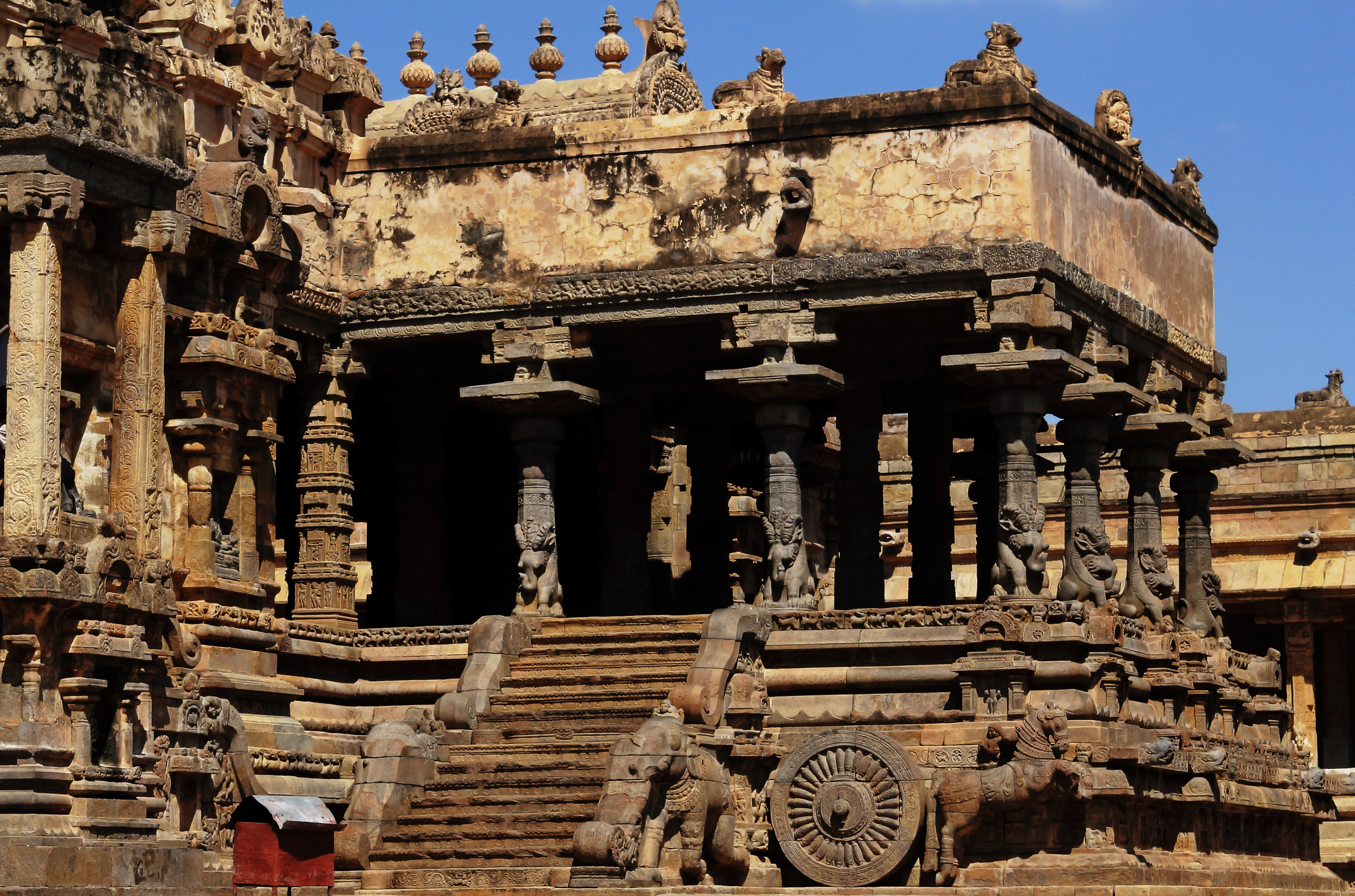
The chariot-shaped agra-mandapam, with pillars and Nandi on top.

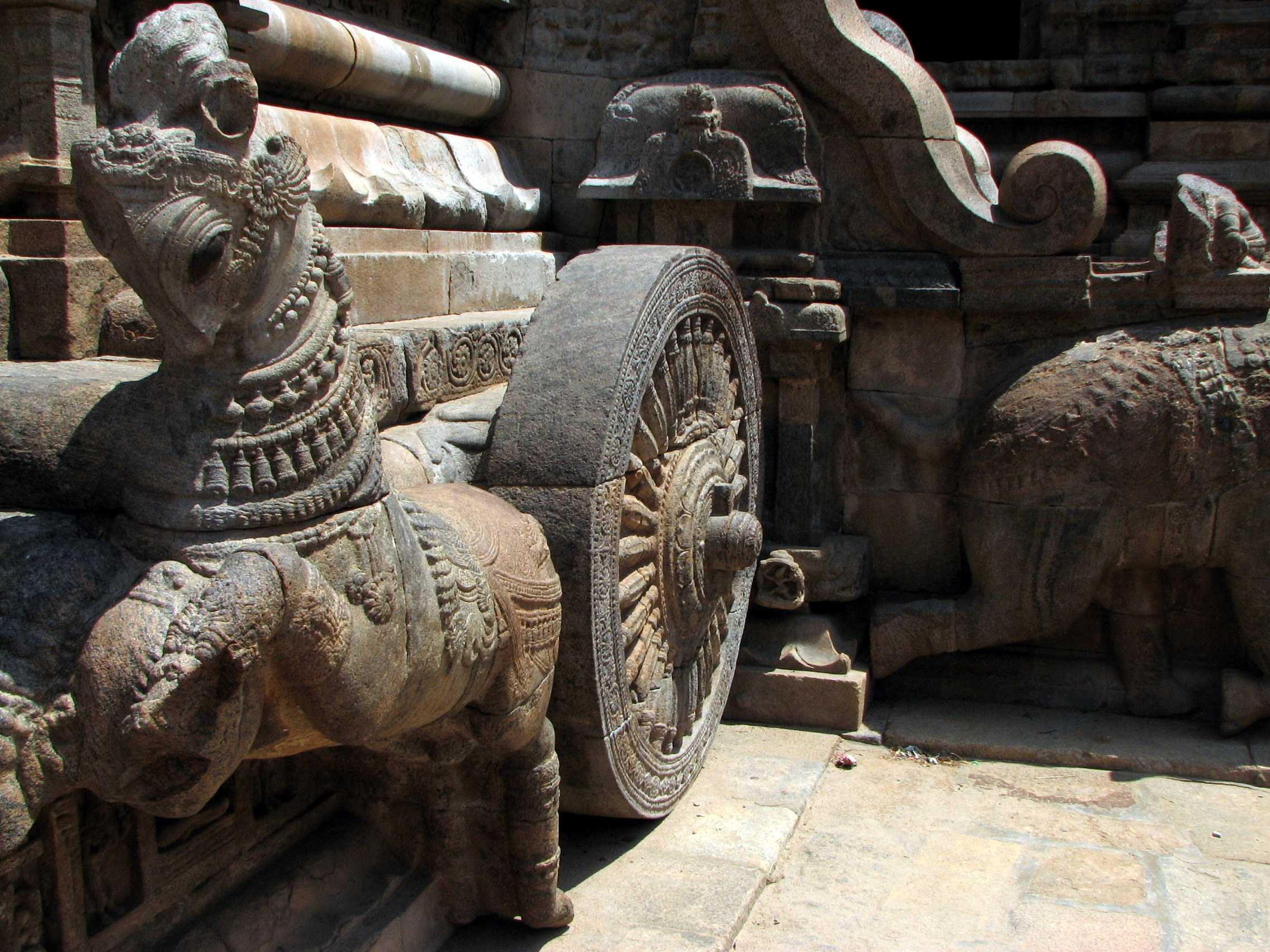
The chariot wheel, the horse's head and body is ruined.

=== Singing steps ===
The agra mandapa has an attached square porch of 7 metres (23 ft) side. It has ornately carved steps that go from east to west. On its east, outside the main podium, is the bali-pitham. It is unusual, in that it is produced as intricately carved balustraded steps, that produce a musical note. They are therefore called the "singing steps".

=== Sculpture ===
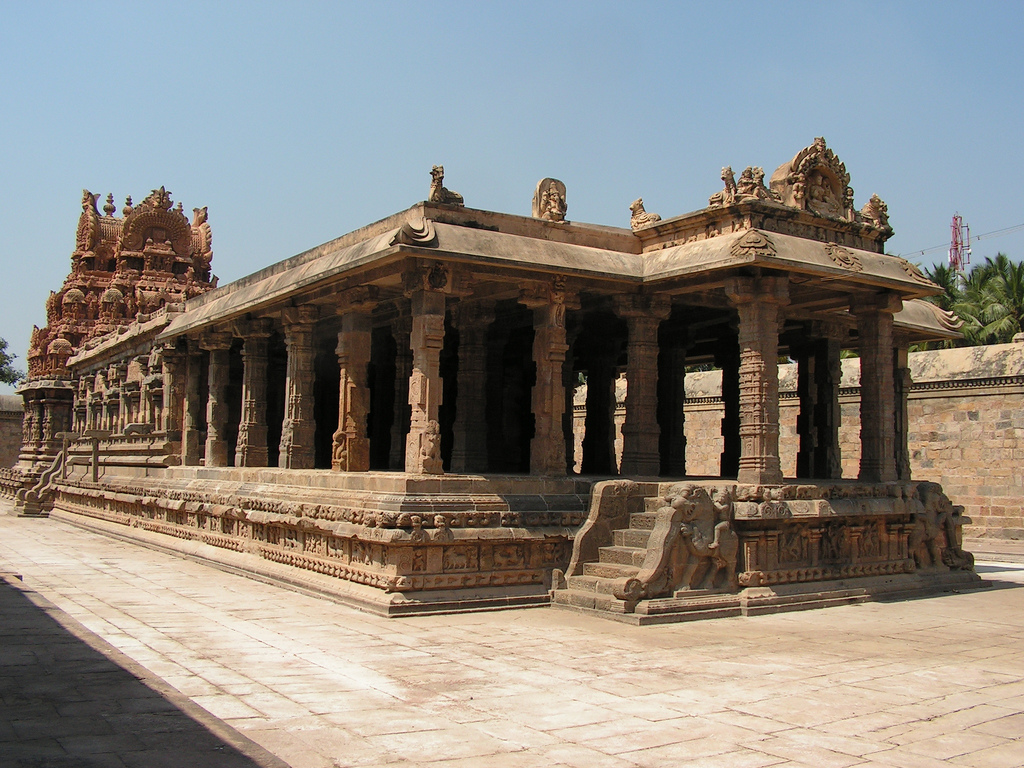
Periya Nayaki, a smaller shrine

This temple is a storehouse of art and architecture and has some exquisite stone carvings. Although this temple is much smaller than the Brihadeesvara Temple or the Gangaikondacholapuram Temple, it is more exquisite in detail. The elevation and proportions of all the units is elegant with sculptures dominating the architecture. The pedestal of the Balipitha adjoins a small shrine which contains an image of Ganesha.

The reliefs all along the base of the main temple narrate the stories of the sixty three Shaiva Bhakti saints called Nayanars. These stories are found in the Periya Purana by Sekkilar.

On the outer walls of the main sanctum are sculpture niches, five on each side, with the middle one larger than others. They show various Hindu deities, with the middle one of each side showing Shiva in different aspects.

=== Other shrines ===
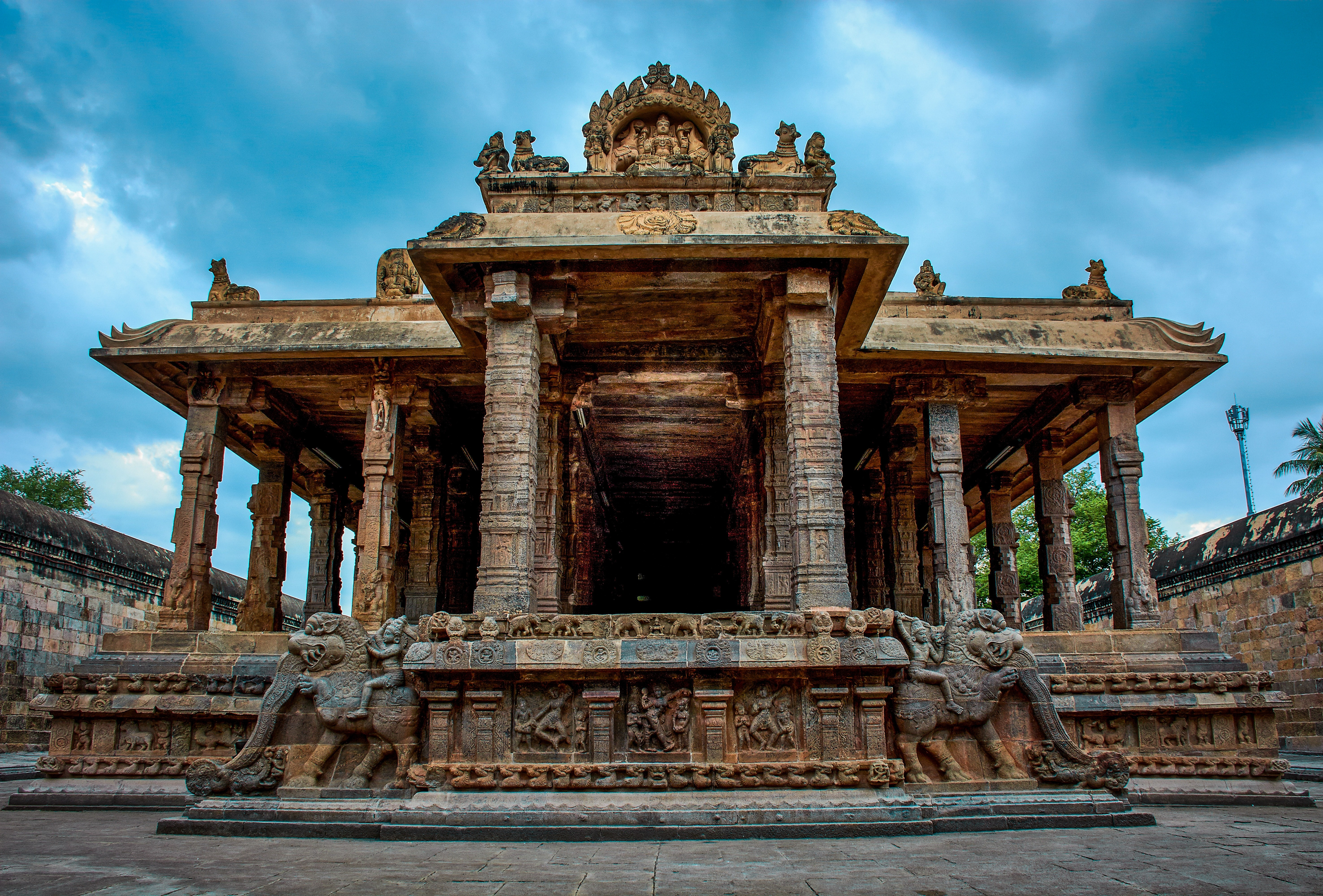
Amman Shrine

In the south-west corner of the court is a mandapam having 4 shrines. One of these has an image of Yama. Adjoining this shrine are large stone slabs sculptured with images of the sapthamathas (seven celestial nymphs). The construction of a separate temple for Devi, slightly later than the main temple, indicates the emergence of the Amman shrine as an essential component of the South Indian temple complex.

=== Inscriptions ===
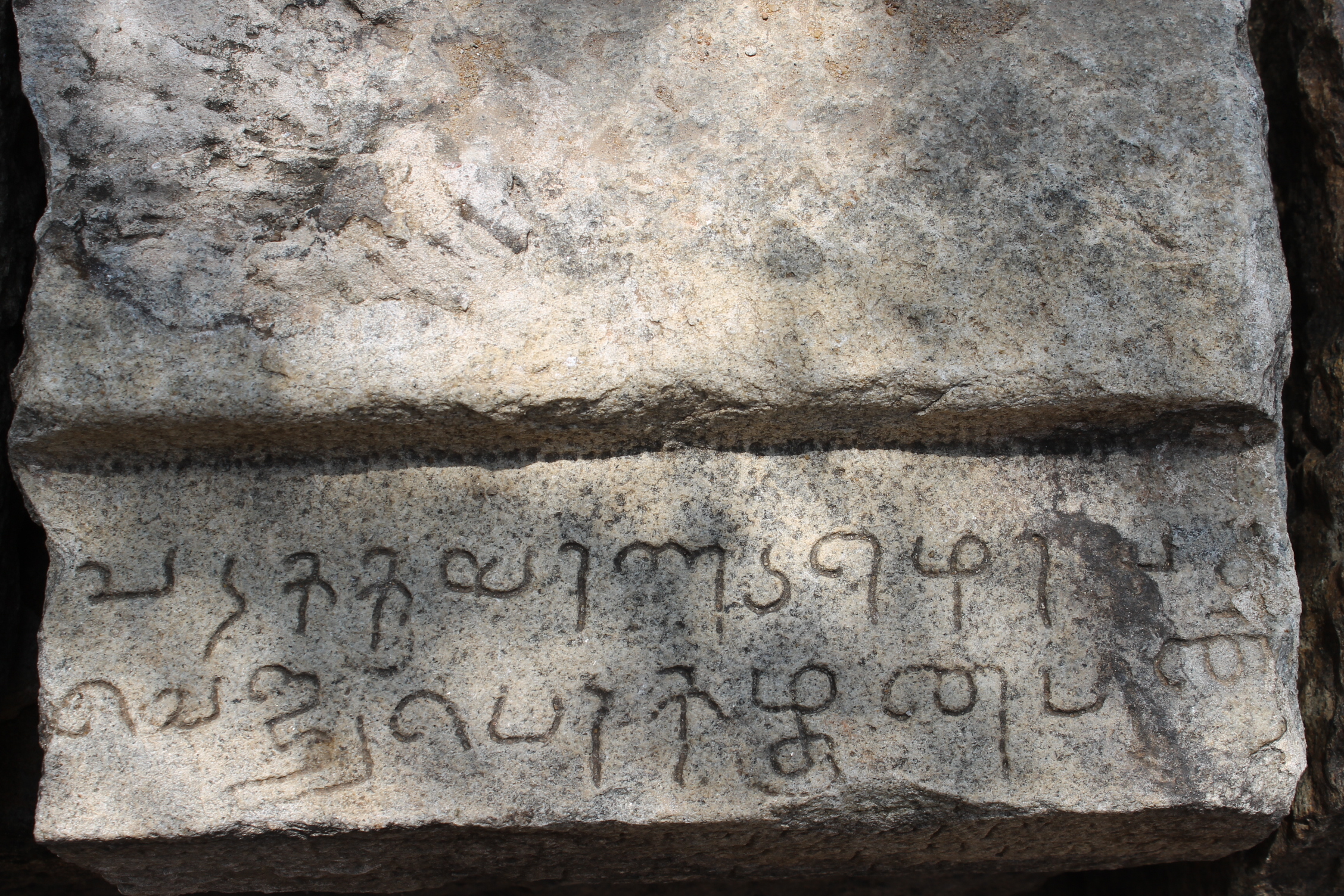
Inscription in Airavatesvara Temple

There are various inscriptions in the temple. One of these records the renovation of the shrines by Kulottunga Chola III. The north wall of the verandah consists of 108 sections of inscriptions, each containing the name and description and image of the 63 Saivacharya (Saivite saints) listing the principal events in their life. This reflects the deep roots of Saivism in this region. Other important sculptures of the temple are the 108 Devara Othuvars who sung in the temple during the time of Raja Raja II. There are sculptures for river goddesses like Cauvery, Ganges, Yamuna, Godavari and Narmada. Another inscription close to the gopura, records that an image was brought from Kalyani, then known as Kalyanapura by emperor Rajadhiraja Chola I after his defeat of the Western Chalukya king Someshwara I, his sons Vikramaditya VI and Someshwara II his capture of the Chalukyan capital.

The inscriptions are also important in identifying the sculptures that once were a part of various ruined monuments. For example, the eastern gopurum has niches with inscriptions that label the sculpture therein. Most of these sculptures are now broken or missing. The inscriptions indicate that it had the following sculptures:

- Northern face: Adi Chandesvara, Gangadevi, Tumburu Nardar, Vaisravana, Chandra, Maha Sata, Nagaraja, Vayu
- West: Devi, Rudrani, Vaishnavi, Brahmi, Varunani, Nandidevar, Periyadevar, Santyatita Sakti, Santa devi, Vidya Sakti, Pratishta Sakti, Nivarti Sakti
- Southern face: Daksha Prajapati, Yamuna devi, Rati, Kamadeva
- East: Agni deva, Agastya, Sri devi, Durga devi, Devendran, Padma Nidhi, Surya, Subrahmanya, Kshetrapala, Sarasvati, Visvakarma, Isana

== History ==
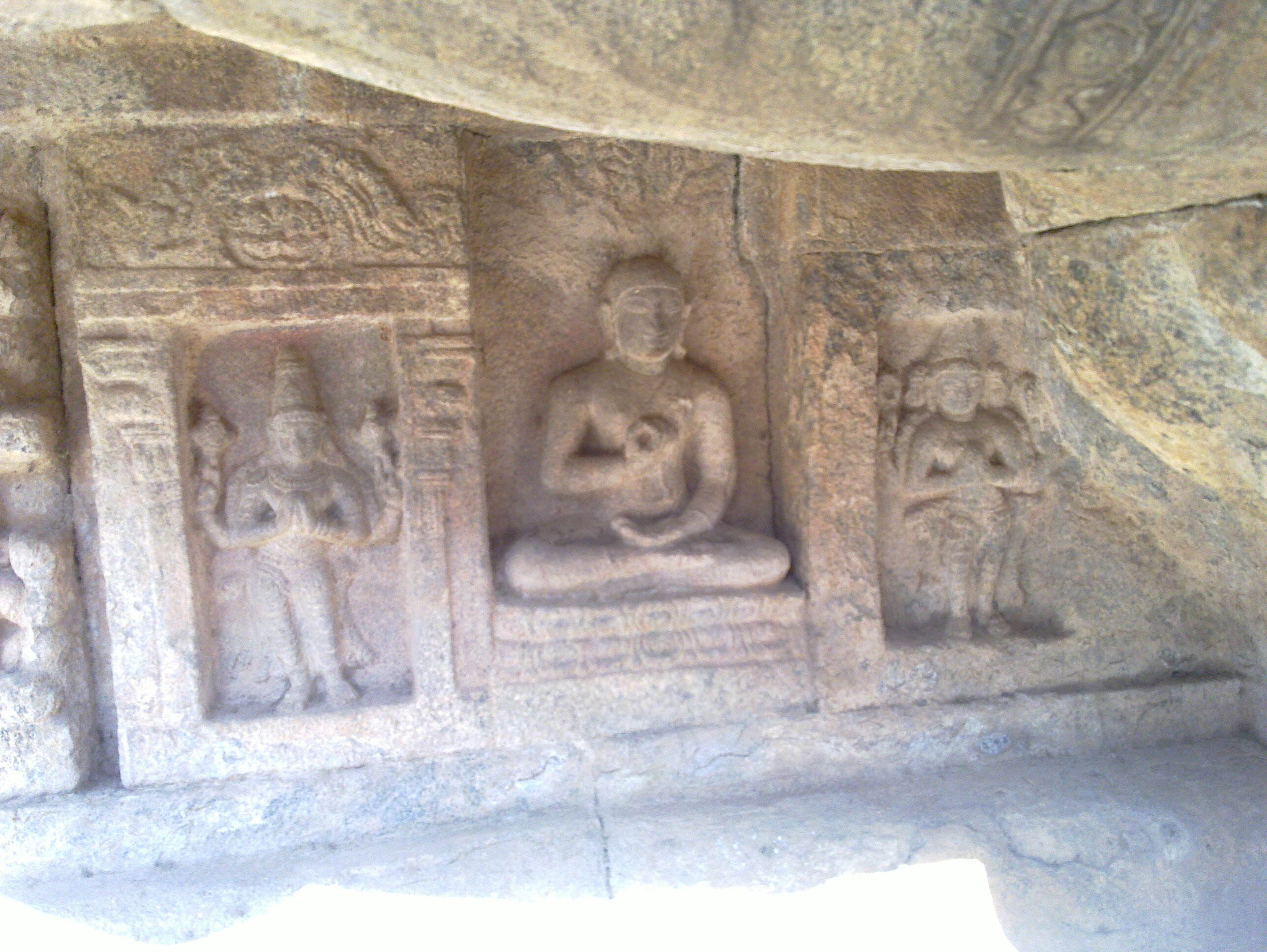
Buddha as an avatara at Airavatesvara Temple

The temple was built by King Rajaraja Chola II. He ruled the Chola Empire between 1146 and 1172 CE. The established capital for his predecessors was Gangapuri, also referred to in some inscriptions as Gangaikonda Cholapuram, named after the king brought water from holy Ganges River by defeating every other kings who opposed him. Rajaraja II, however, spent most of his time in the secondary capital city of Ayirattali, also called Pazhaiyarai and Rajarajapuri. This urban complex included Darasuram, the site of Airavatesvara Temple in Kumbakonam. He was a patron of Tamil literature and sponsored new Hindu temples in the empire, instead of enhancements and expansions supported by his father and grandfather. The temple at Ayirattali, which came to be known as the Airavatesvarar temple in inscriptions is one of his legacies.

The Airavatesvara temple was much larger than it is now. It had sapta veedhis (seven streets) and seven courts, similar to the Srirangam temple, according to the inscriptions. All are gone, except the one court with the main temple that survives. There are ruins of gopuram and some structures at some distance from the current visitor premises confirming that the site was badly damaged at some point like the other major Chola era temples and various Chola cities including the capital Gangaikonda Cholapuram.

The reasons for this destruction are unclear. According to Vasanthi, the Pandyas who defeated the Cholas during the later part of 13th century "may have raged the city [Gangaikonda Cholapuram] to ground" to avenge their previous defeats. However, it is unclear why other temples were destroyed and this temple was spared, as well as why there are around 20 inscriptions from later Cholas, Pandyas and Vijayanagar Empire indicating various gifts and grants to this temple. An alternate theory links the destruction to the raids, plunder and wars, particularly with the invasion of the capital city and the territories that were earlier a part by the Chola Empire along with Madurai by the armies of Delhi Sultanate led by the Muslim commander Malik Kafur in 1311, followed by Khusrau Khan in 1314 and Muhammad bin Tughlaq in 1327. The period that followed saw wars between the Hindu kings and the Muslim Sultans who seceded the Delhi Sultanate and carved out new polity such as the nearby Madurai Sultanate (1335–1378).Thanjavur was a target of both Muslim and Hindu neighboring kingdoms, both near and far. The Madurai Sultanate was established in the 14th century, after the disastrous invasions and plunder of South India by Ala ud-Din Khalji's armies of Delhi Sultanate led by Malik Kafur.George Michell (2008), Architecture and art of Southern India, Cambridge University Press, pages 9–13, 16-21 Later Adil Shahi Sultanate, Qutb Shahis, Randaula Khan and others from east and west coasts of South India raided it, and some occupied it for a few years. The Vijayanagara Empire defeated the Madurai Sultanate in 1378 and this temple along with other Chola era temples thereafter came under Hindu kings again who repaired and restored many of them.

== World Heritage Site ==
Airavatesvara Temple was added to UNESCO's World Heritage Site list of Great Living Chola Temples in the year 2004. The Great Living Chola Temples includes the Brihadeeswara Temple at Thanjavur, the Temple of Gangaikondacholisvaram at Gangaikonda Cholapuram and the Airavatesvara Temple at Kumbakonam. All of these temples were built by the Cholas between the 10th and 12th centuries CE and have a lot of similarities.

== In popular culture ==
The American astronomer Carl Sagan visited the Airavatesvara Temple for his 1980 television documentary series, Cosmos: A Personal Voyage. In the tenth episode titled The Edge of Forever, Sagan talks about the Hindu religion and the Vedas, and narrates the legend of the god Shiva being considered a cosmic deity while displaying ancient Indian art.

== Palace Devasthanam ==
Thanjavur Palace Devasthanam comprises 88 temples, of which this temple is the one. They are maintained and administered by the Hindu Religious and Charitable Endowments Department of the Government of Tamil Nadu.

== Gallery ==
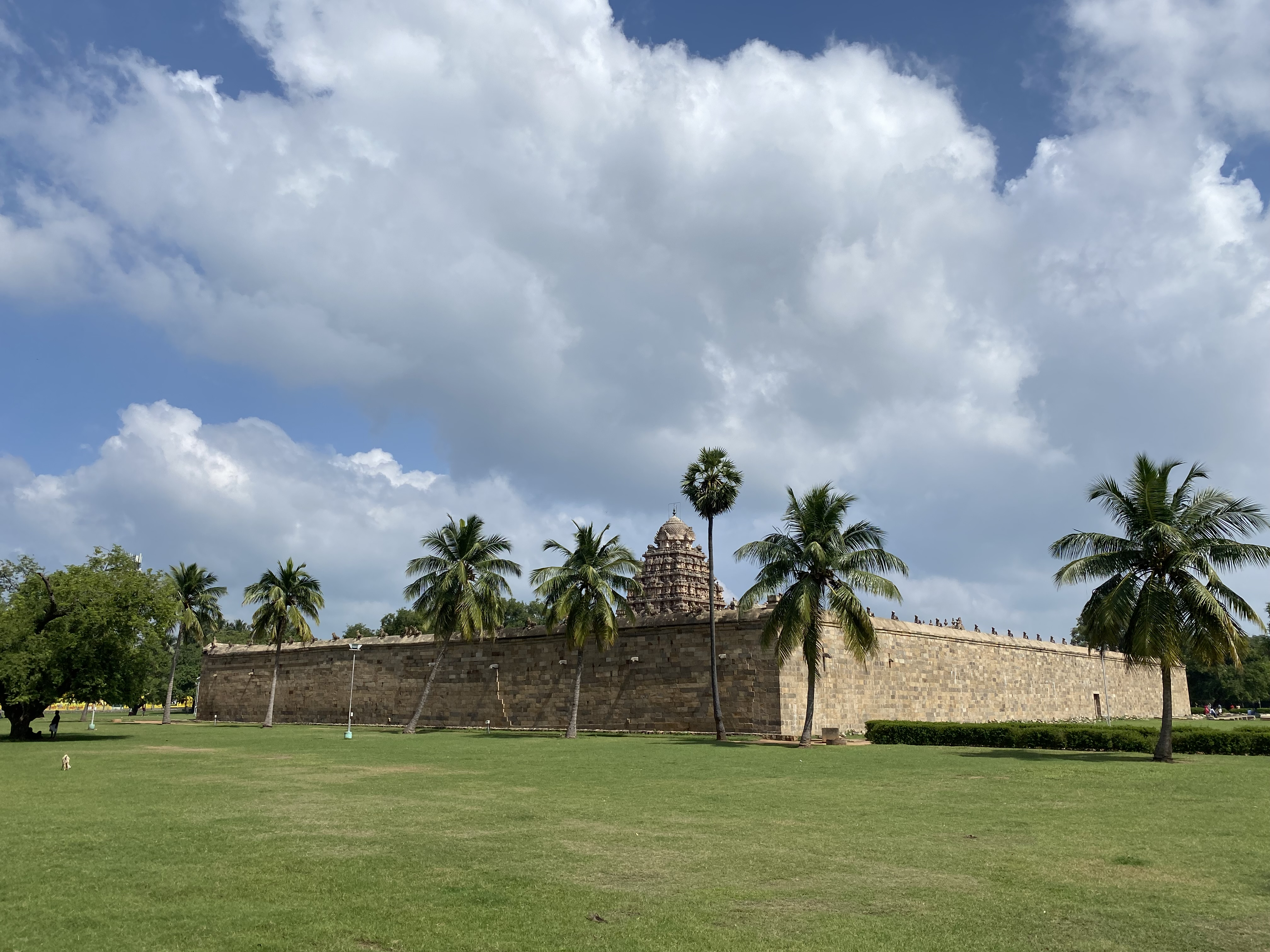
Enclosure wall of the Airavatesvara Temple complex

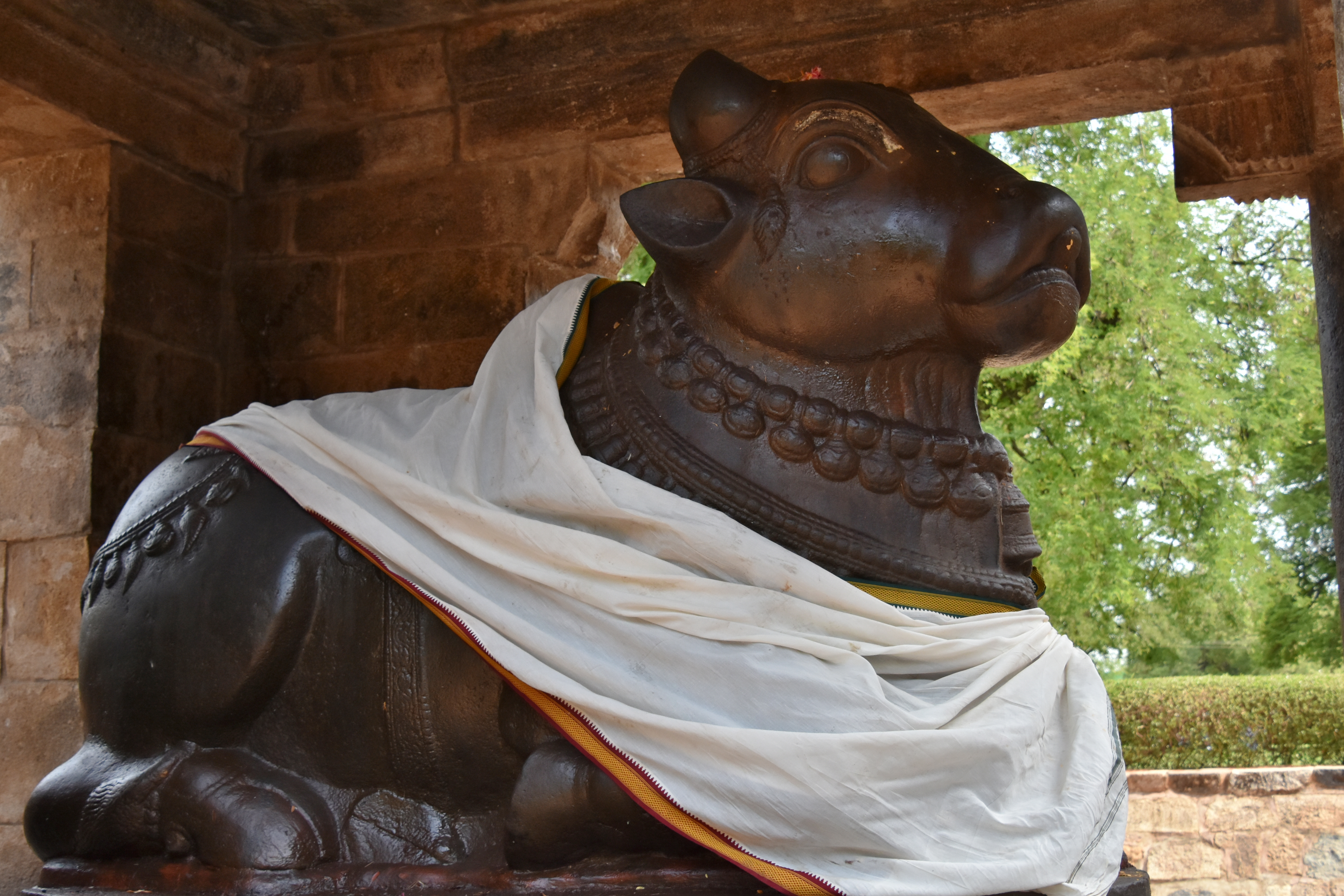
Nandi at the temple

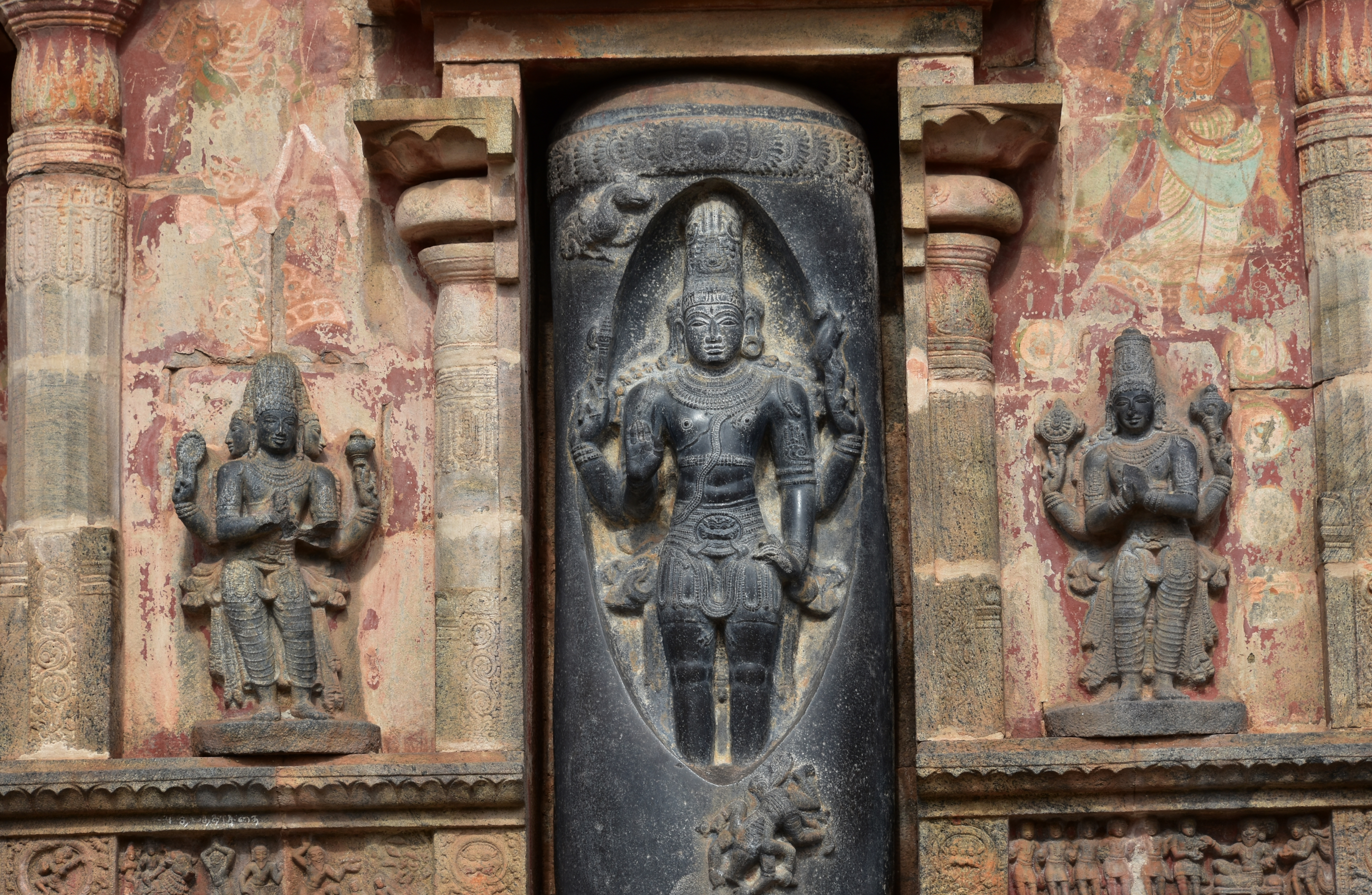
Shiva flanked by Brahma (left) and Vishnu

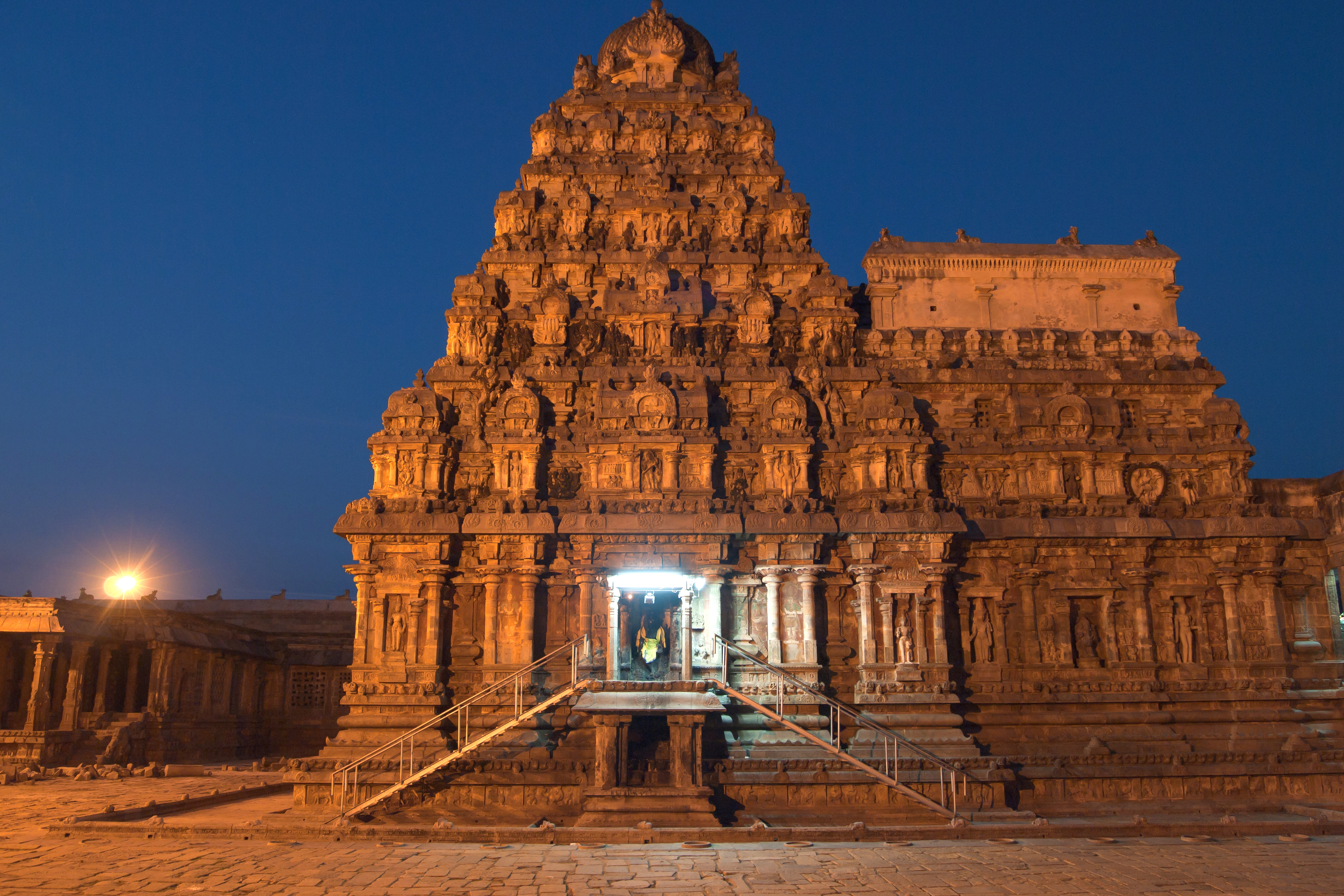
This is the other side of the gopuram sculpted with sculptures

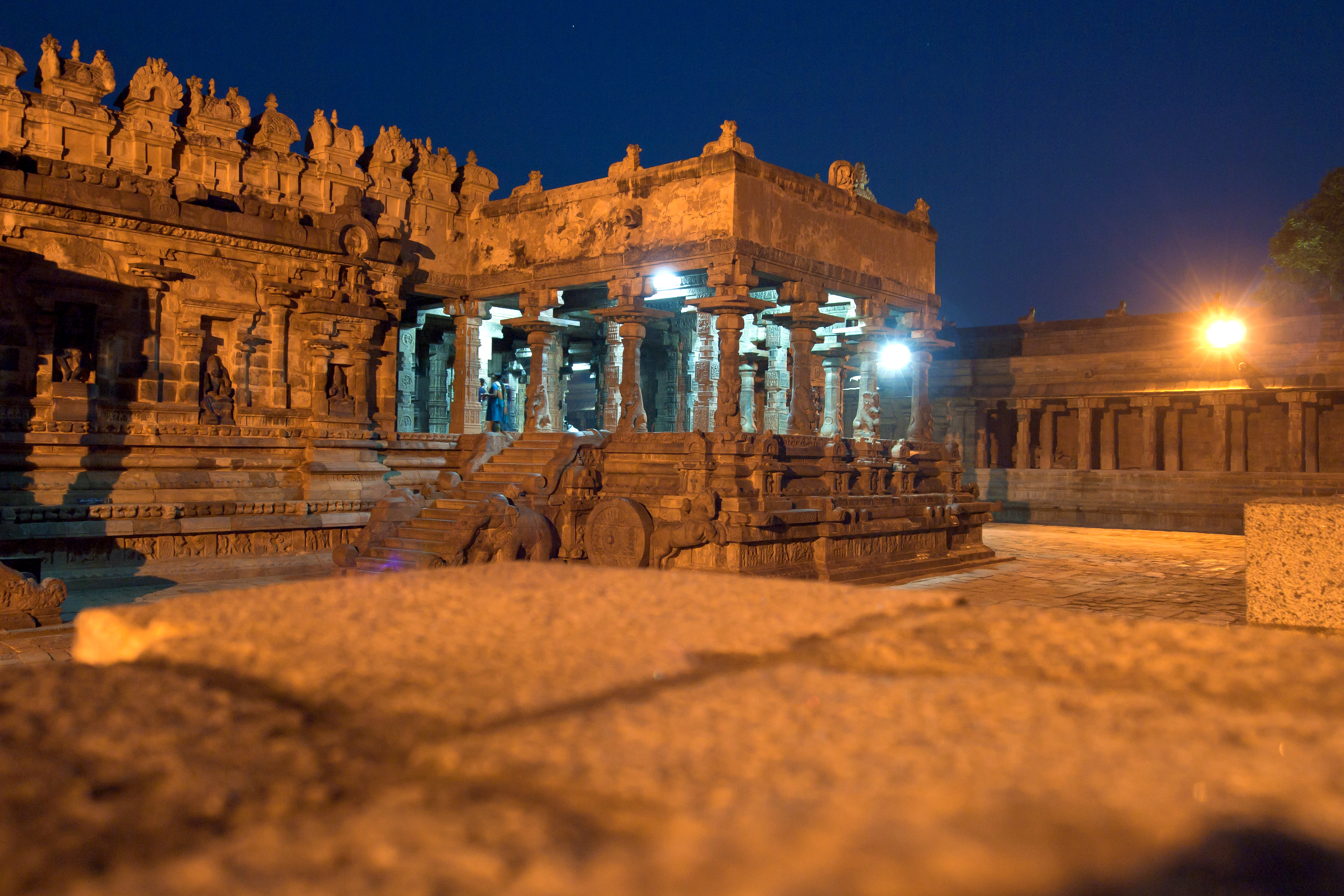
Mandapa at night

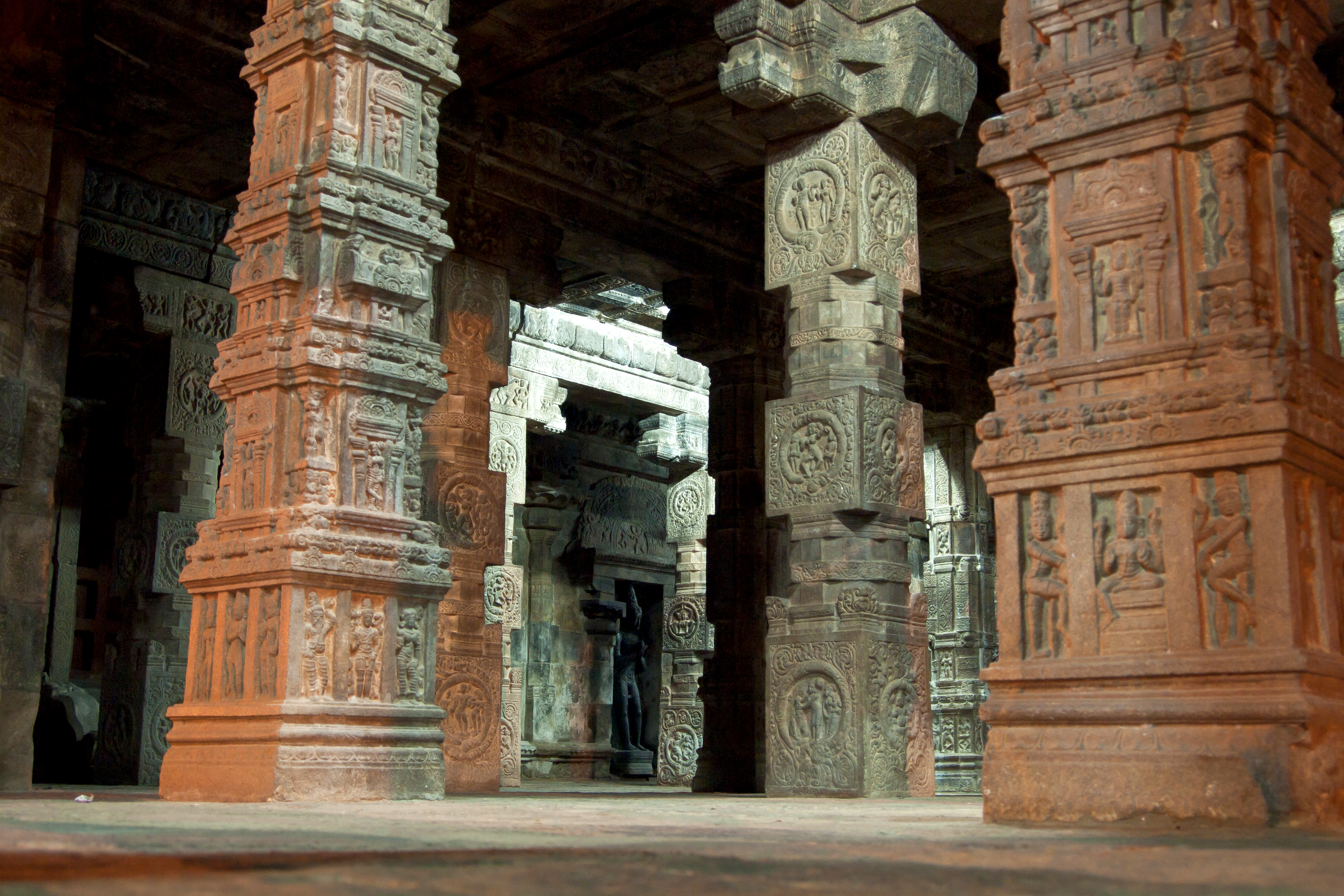
Interior

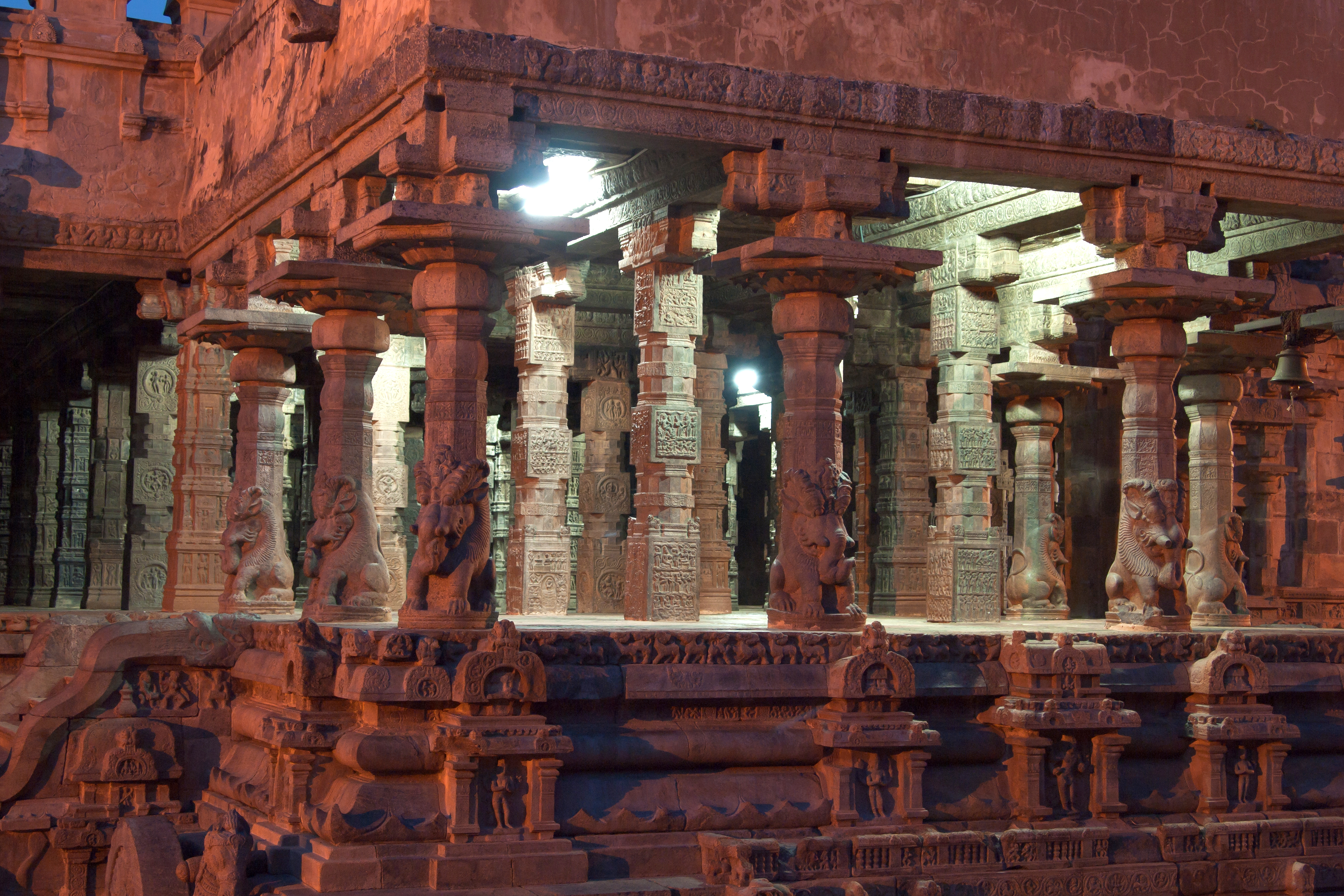
Columns with Dravidian reliefs and carvings

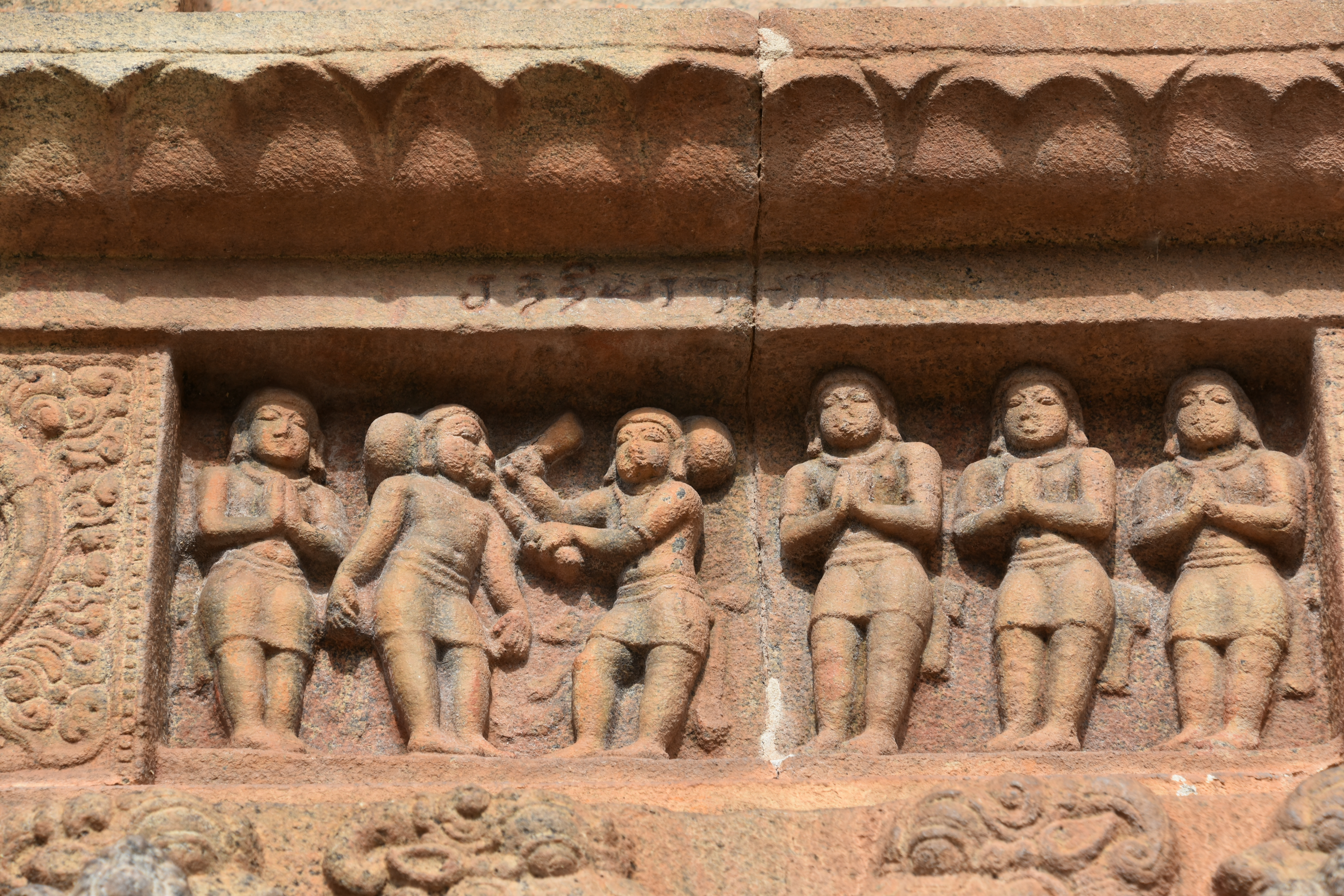
Sculptures carved on the walls

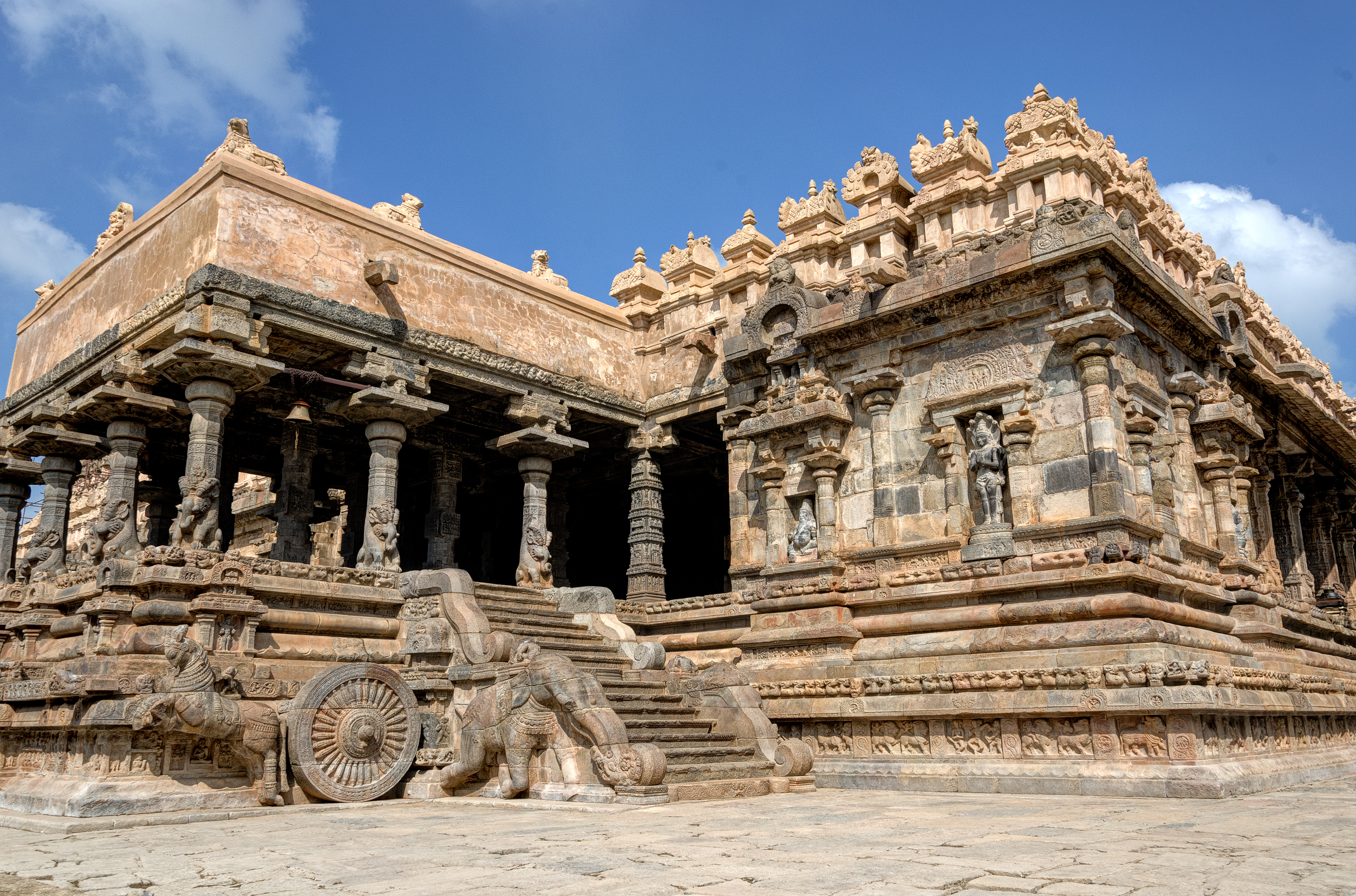
Stone chariot madapam detail

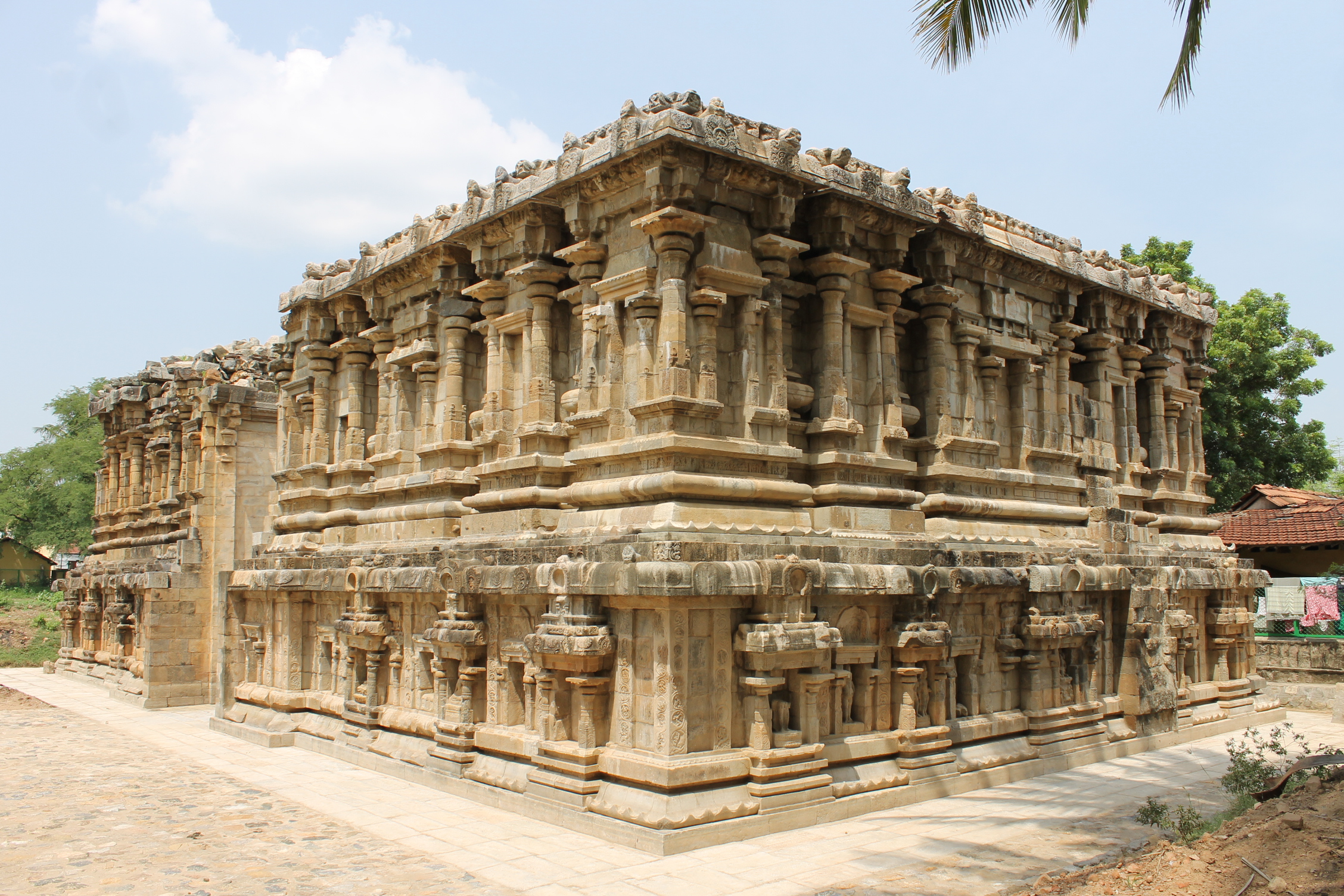
Front Gopuram in ruins

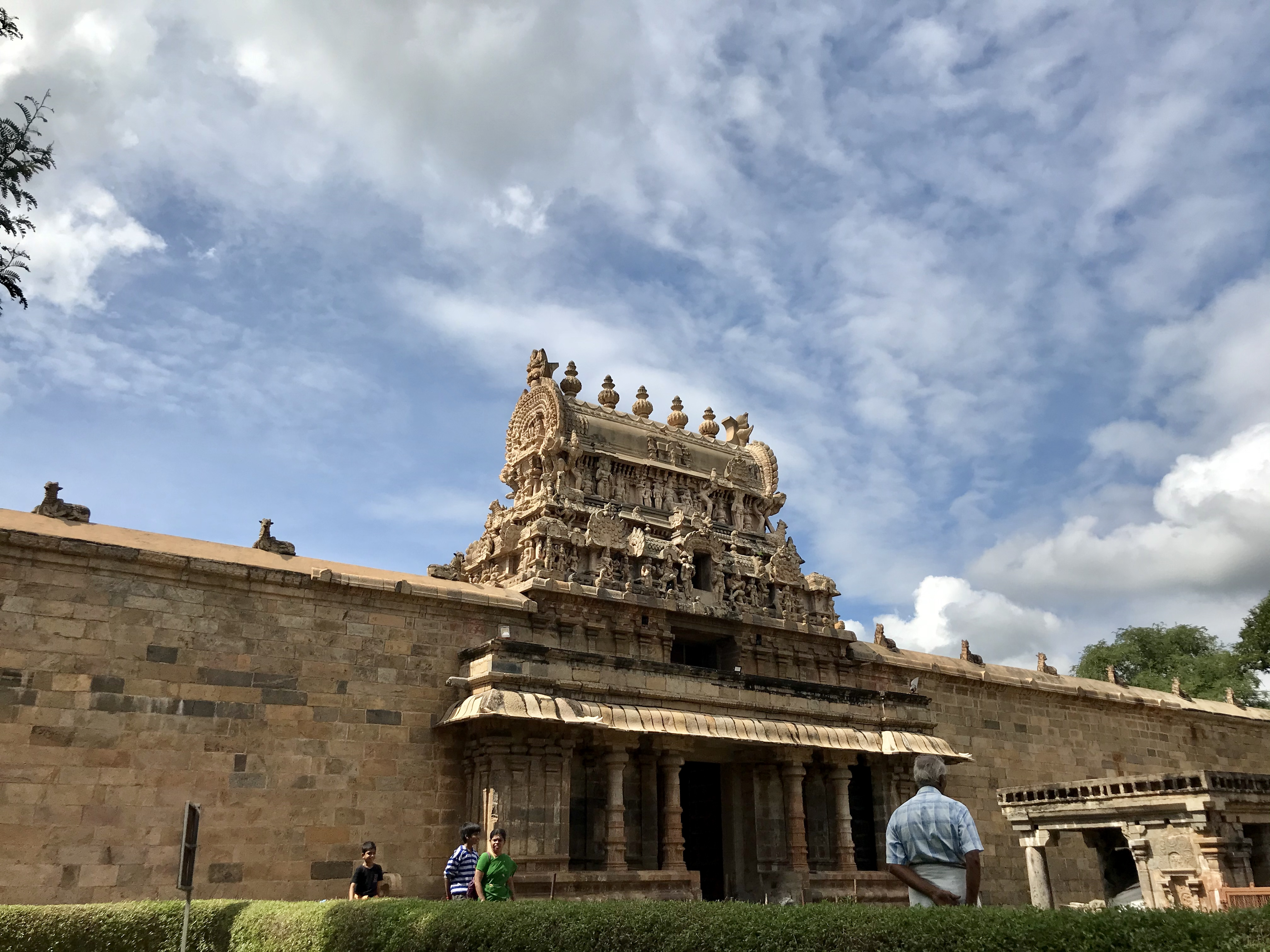
Airavateswarar Temple

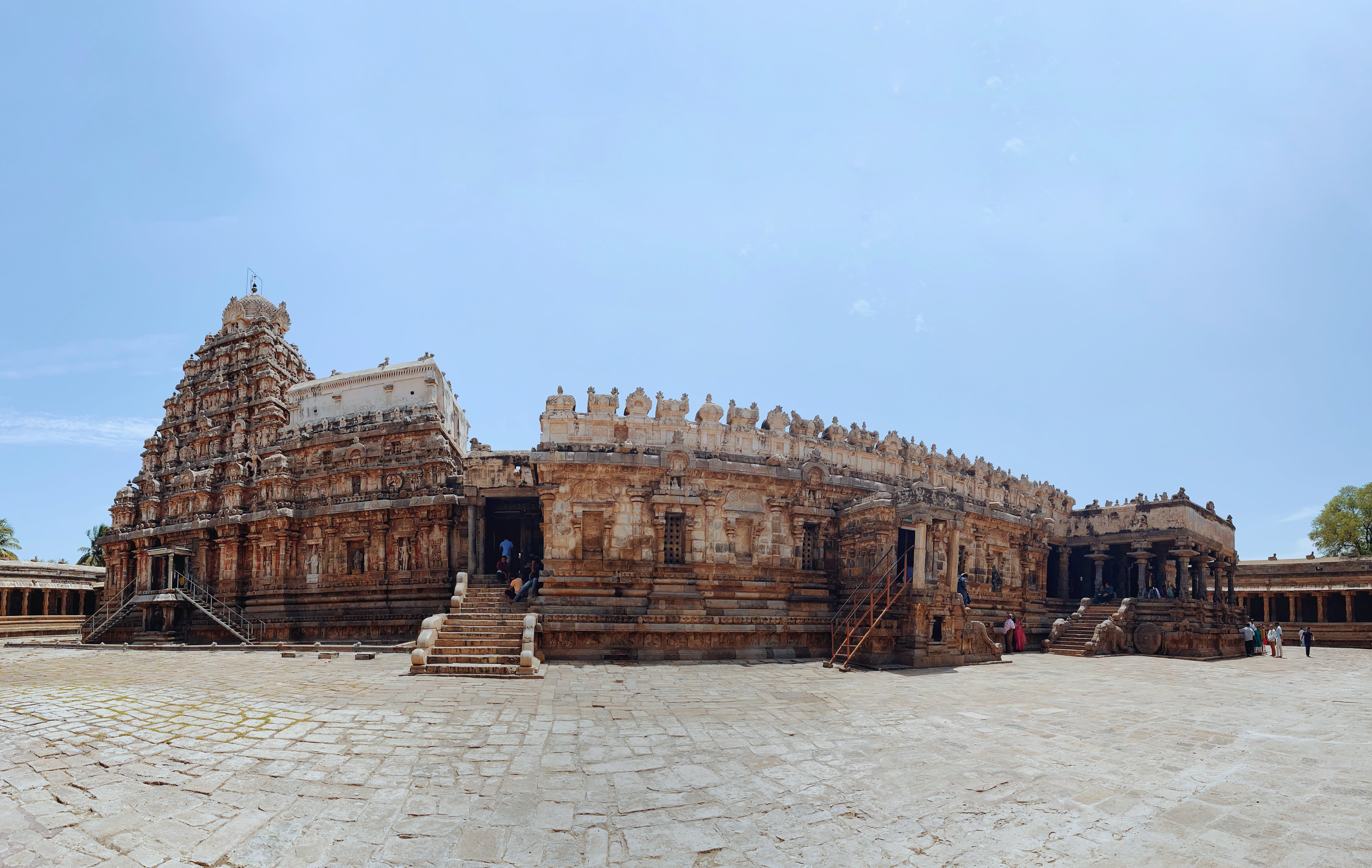
Airavatesvara Temple Panoramic View
