= Thirubuvanam, Thanjavur =

Thirubuvanam
- suburban kumbakonam city
- Location in Tamil Nadu, India
- Coordinates: 10.59°N 79.26°E
- Country: India
- State: Tamil Nadu
- District: Thanjavur

Government
  - CHAIRMAN: M.L.Ayyansamy

Population (2011)
  - Total: 14,989

Languages
  - Official: Tamil
- Time zone: UTC+5:30 (IST)
- PIN: 612103
- Telephone code: 0435
- Vehicle registration: TN:68
- Website: www.thirubuvanam.com

Thirubuvanam is a panchayat town in Thanjavur district in the Indian state of Tamil Nadu. The town is mainly known for the Kampaheswarar Temple.

== Demographics ==
As of 2001 India census, Thirubuvanam had a population of 14,139. Males constitute 50% of the population and females 50%. Thirubuvanam has an average literacy rate of 70%, higher than the national average of 59.5%: male literacy is 77%, and female literacy is 63%. In Thirubuvanam, 11% of the population is under 6 years of age.

The population consists primarily of silk weavers. Thirubuvanam has a major dominance of Saurashtra people.

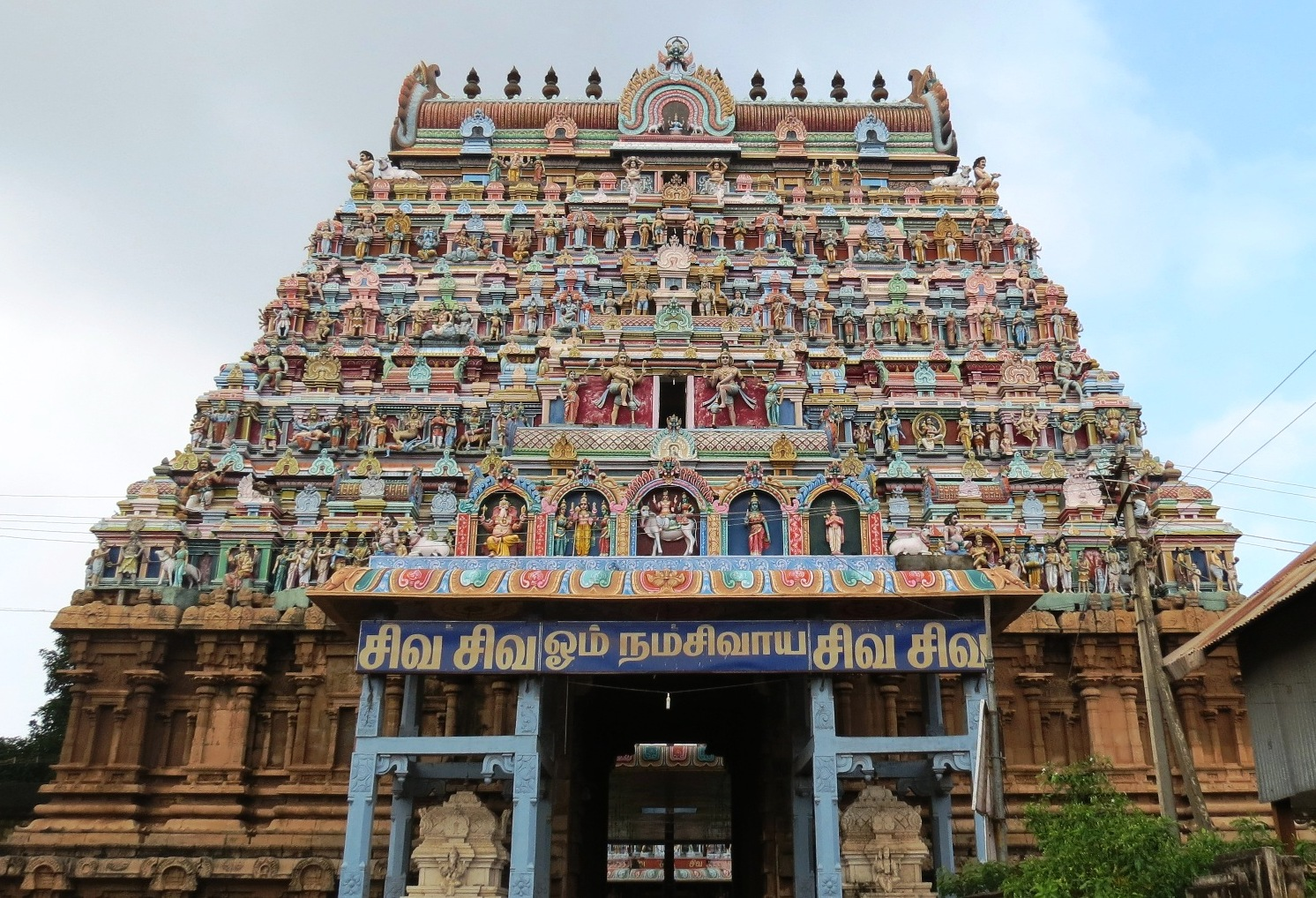
Kampahareshwara Temple Gopuram

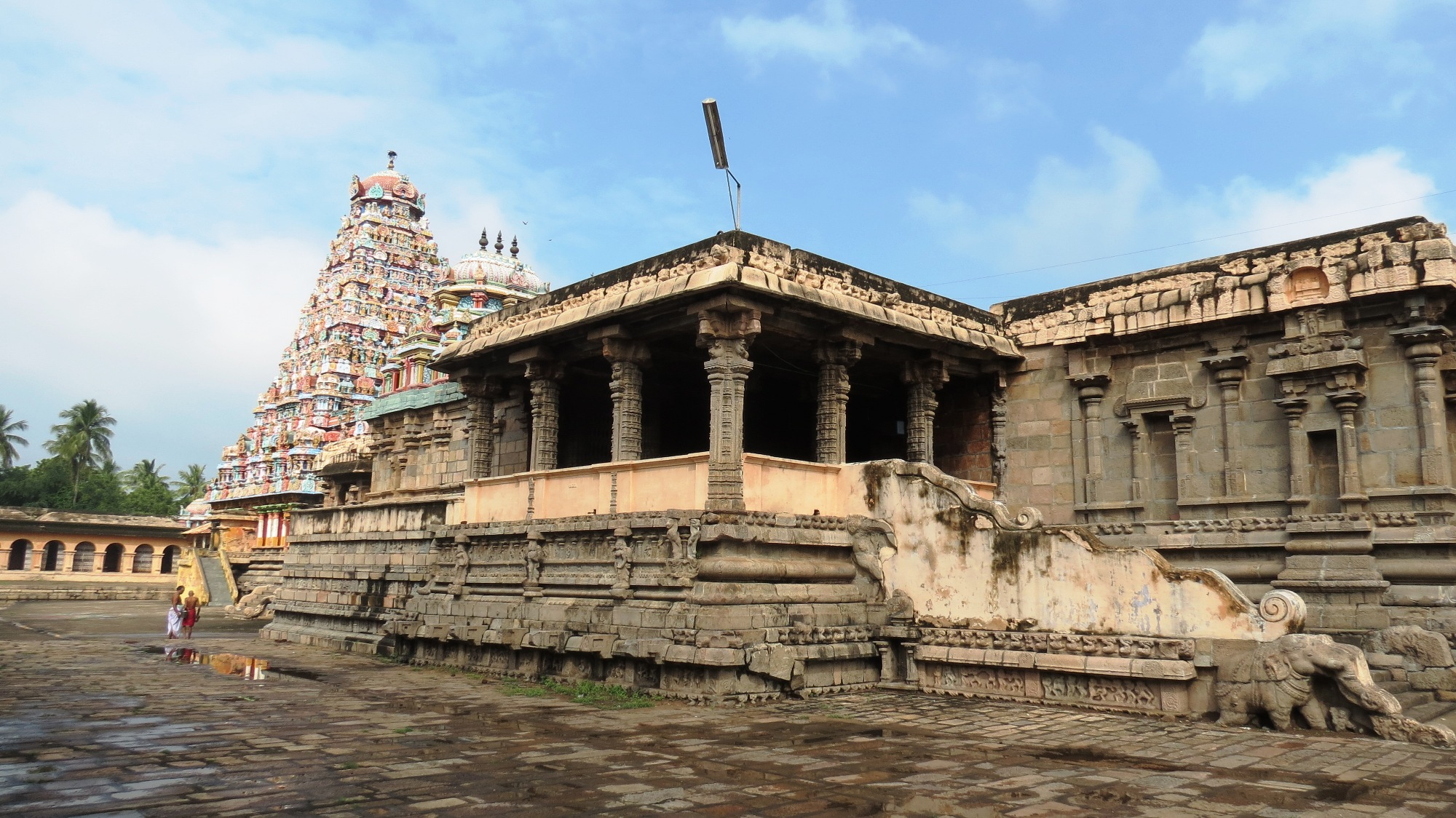
Kampahareshwarar Temple complex, Thirupuvanam

There is an ancient Kampaheswarar Temple in Thirubuvanam.

Thirubuvanam is very near the Cauvery River and is known as a manufacturing hub for silk sari and clothing materials, which is also located in the state of Tamil Nadu.

Silk saries from Thirubuvanam are therefore famous as originating from this region of Tamil Nadu known for the production of clothing and silk saris in particular.

== Thico silks ==
Thico Silks - The Thirubuvanam Silk handloom weavers Cooperative Production and Sale Society Limited, Thirubuvanam was started with the twin purpose of preserving the art of silk-weaving and uplifting the life of the artistically rich but economically poor weavers of this region. This society was started with an investment of ten thousand rupees in 1955, now does business to the tune of 43 crores a year The head office is located at Thirubuvanam, situated just 6 kilometres away from Kumbakonam it has 39 other branches spread across Tamil Nadu
