= Thenupuriswarar Temple, Patteeswaram =

Patteswaram
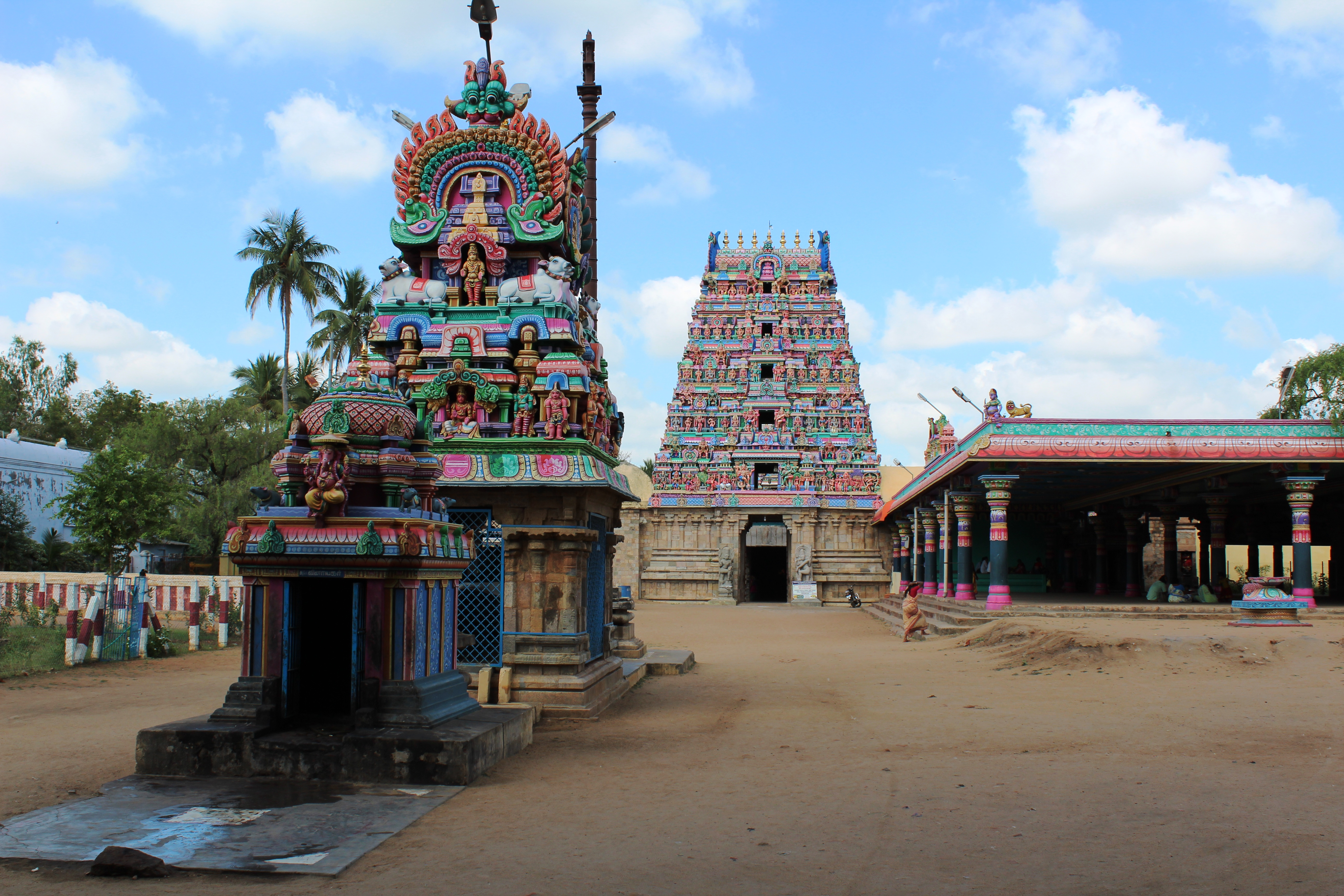

- Location in Tamil Nadu

Religion
- Affiliation: Hinduism
- District: Tanjore
- Deity: Thenupureeswarar (Shiva) Somakambalambigai (Parvathi)
- Features: Temple tank: Brahma Theertham

Location
- Location: Patteeswaram
- State: Tamil Nadu
- Country: India
- Coordinates: 10°55′29″N 79°20′42″E

Architecture
- Type: Dravidian architecture

Thenupuriswarar Temple is a Hindu temple dedicated to the god Shiva located in the village of Patteeswaram, Tamil Nadu, India. Shiva is worshiped as Thenupuriswarar, and is represented by the lingam. His consort Parvati is depicted as Nyanambikai (Somakamalambigai). The presiding deity is revered in the 7th-century-CE Tamil Saiva canonical work, the Tevaram, written by Tamil saint poets known as the Nayanars and classified as Paadal Petra Sthalam. The temple is associated with the legend of Sambandar to whose view Nandi moved to have a direct view of the presiding deity. Muthupandal festival celebrated in the temple in associated with the legend.

The temple complex covers around four acres and entered through a seven tiered gopuram, the main gateway. The temple has a number of shrines, with those of Thenupuriswarar, his consort Somakamalambigai and Durga, being the most prominent. All the shrines of the temple are enclosed in large concentric rectangular granite walls.

The temple has six daily rituals at various times from 6:00 a.m. to 8:30 p.m., and four yearly festivals on its calendar. The Brahmotsavam festival is celebrated during the month of the Chittirai (April - May) is the most prominent festival.

The original complex is believed to have been built by Cholas, while the present masonry structure was built during the Nayak during the 16th century. In modern times, the temple is maintained and administered by the Hindu Religious and Charitable Endowments Department of the Government of Tamil Nadu.

== Legend ==
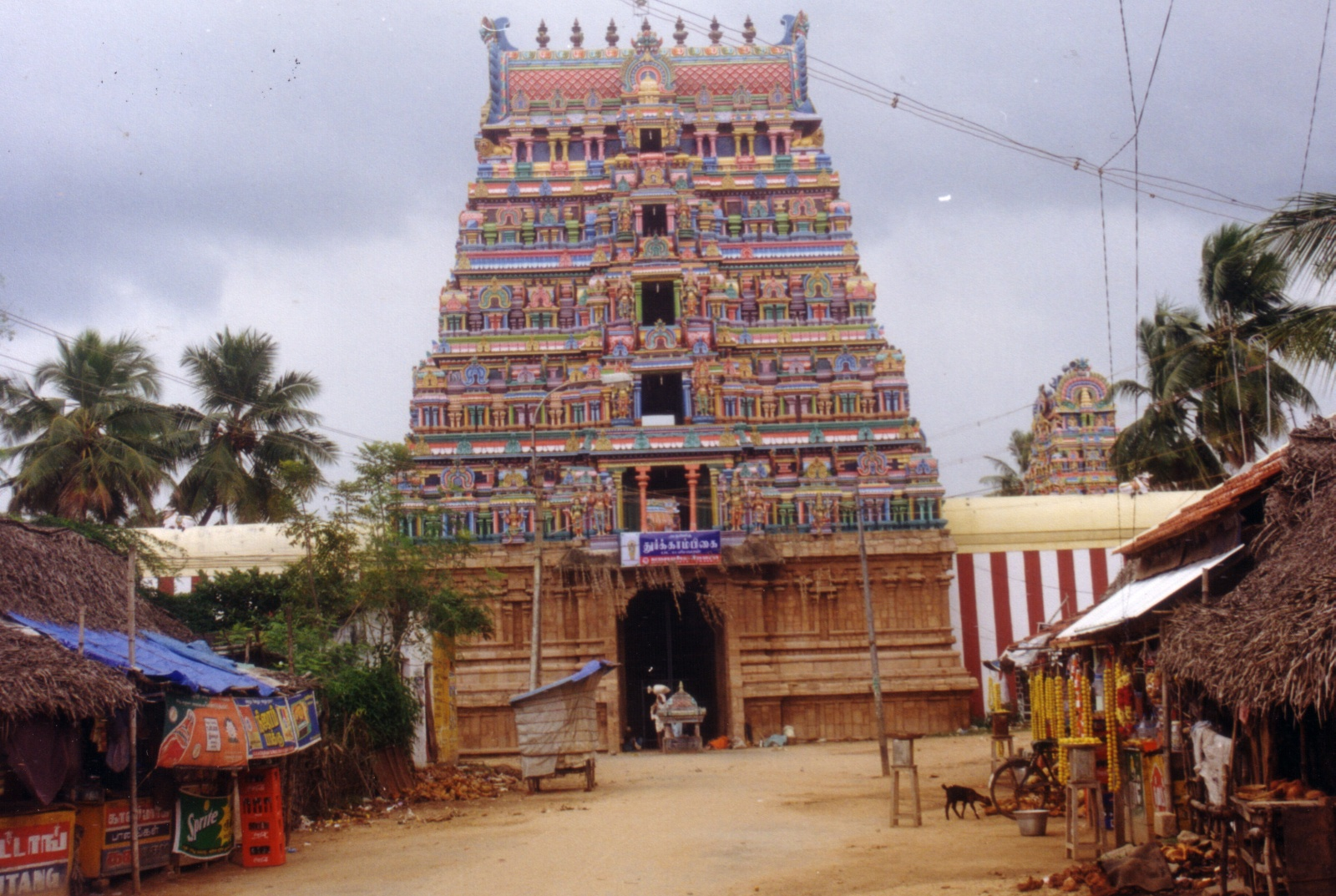
The main entrance of the temple

Tirugnana Sambandar came to Thirusattimutram with Adiyars(saints) to worship at the Shiva temple. Then he started towards Patteeswaram. Since the Solar movement was towards the Mituna star causing oppressive heat waves, the child Sambandar could not manage. The Lord sent his bhoodaganas(servants) to decorate the streets with beautiful Muthu pandal(ceiling made of Pearl). The bhoodaganas prepared the pandal (ceiling) without Sambandar's knowledge. Sambandar was astonished by the reverence of God and enjoyed the shade offered. In order that Sambandar has a view of the sanctum sanctorum from outside, Shiva ordered Nandi to shift position. Shiva is revered by the hymns of Sambandar.

The name Patteeswaram was derived from the daughter of the divine cow Kamadhenu - Patti, who worshipped the lord here. Rama is believed to have been relieved of Sayagathi dosha for killing Vali. Parvati herself performed penance here, while sage Vishwamitra was admitted in the company of Brahmarishis with the backing of Gayatri mantra in this place. Sage Markandeya worshipped here and all the Navagrahas here face the Sun-god Surya and are positioned as per the Agama tradition.

== History ==
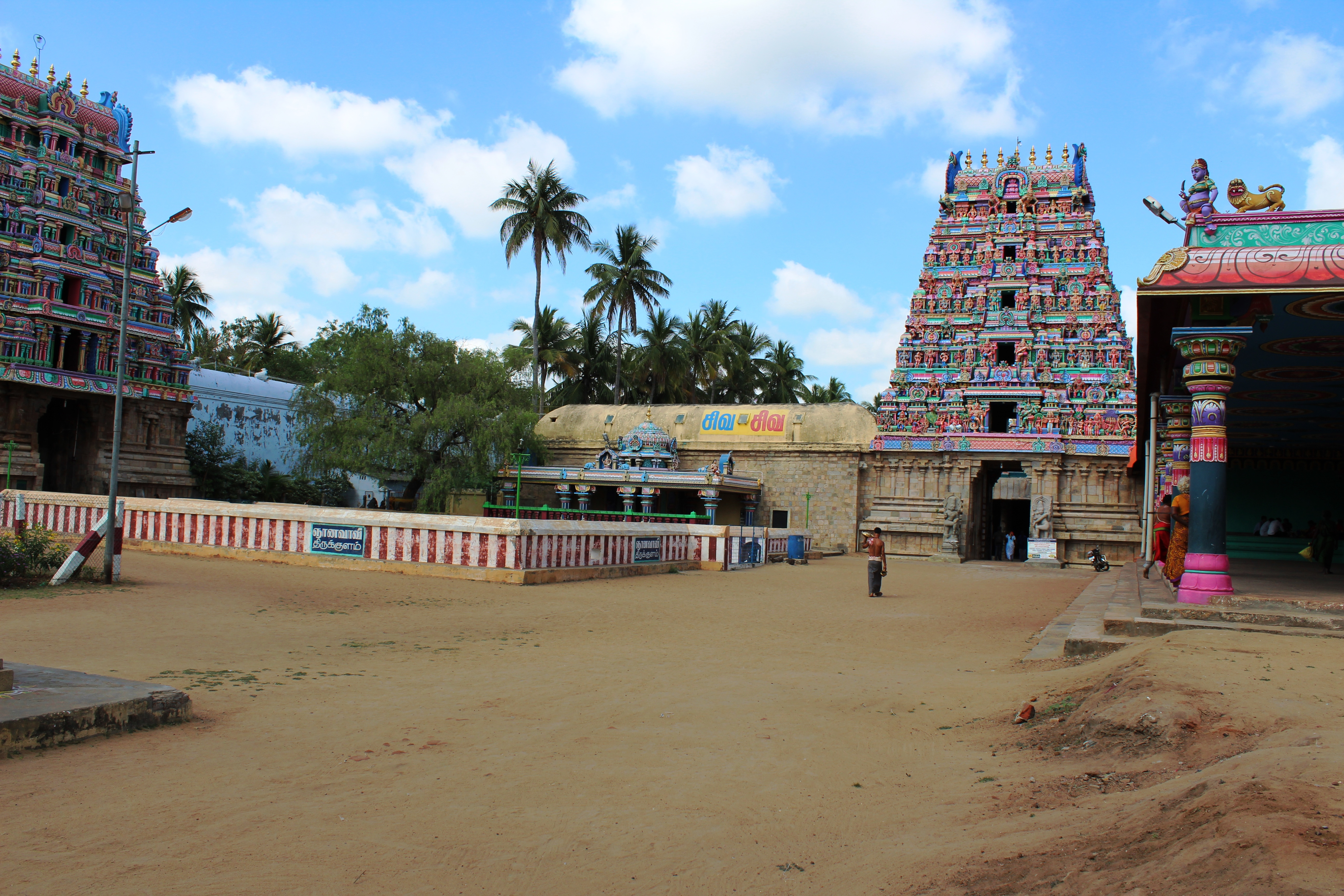
Shrine of Vinayagar and southern gopuram in the temple

The temple was originally believed to have been built by Cholas. Most of the Chola temples built during the period of 866 and 1004 CE is associated with certain military events or political campaign. Govinda Dikshitar, the minister of Raghunatha Nayak took special interest in the temple as he was staying at Pateeswaram. Various bathing ghats and Pushyamandapas were built during his regime in various temples in the region. There are two inscriptions in the temple dating back to the 12th century. The first recorded inscription numbered 21 G of 1908 is from the period of Veeraprathapa Devarayar during 1199 indicating the building of a temple tank, a hall and gifts to the temple. 21 H.08 is made during 1137 during the same regime indicating modifications done to the temple and gifts worth 9.5 velis of land to the temple. There are five inscriptions dating back to the 16th century during the Nayak period. One of them indicates the prevalent culture of presenting the goddess with a saree when families in the village arrange a marriage. Another inscription glorifies the temple and equates the holiness of this temple with Vridagiriswarar temple, Thyagarajar temple, Thiruvengadu temple at Thiruvengadu, Thiruchayakadu and Kailasa. There is another inscription near the Balipeeda that indicates about the prevalence of Thirunavukarasara Mutt, Thirugnanasambandar Mutt and Thirumoolathevar Mutt. The temple owns around 41 acres and 61 cents of Nanjai lands and 100 acre and 91 cents of Punjai lands. The temple was originally administered by Kumbakonam Devastana committee till 7 August 1945 when it was shifted to Hindu Religious and Charitable Endowments Department, Government of Tamil Nadu.

== Architecture ==
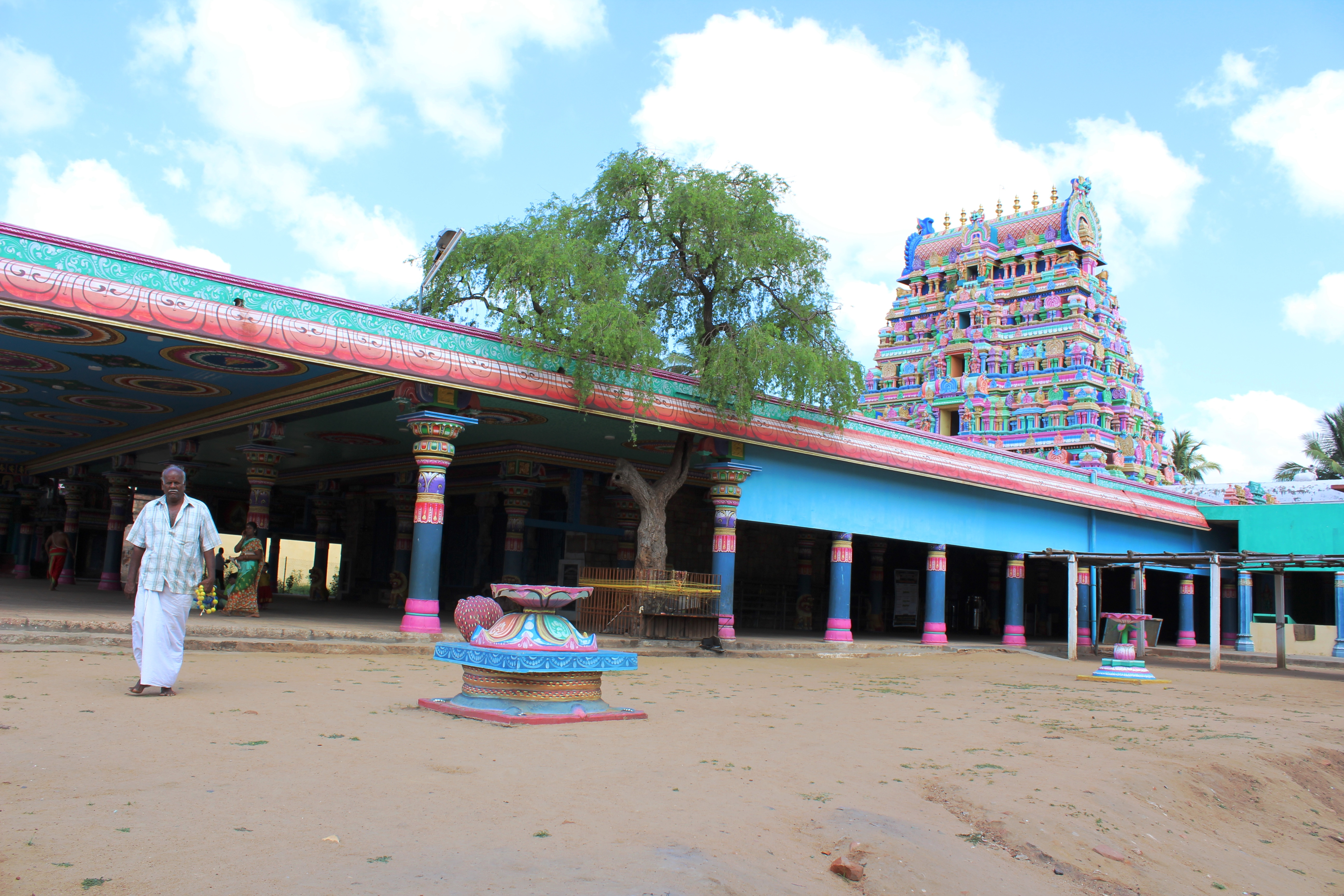
Shrine of Durga in the temple

The temple is located 6 km away from Kumbakonam on the Kumbakonam- Aavoor road. The temple is 3 km away from Darasuram. The best mode is taking town buses from Kumbakonam or mini buses from Darasuram. The Darasuram railway station is also close by to the temple. The temple is surrounded by vast streets on all the four sides. The temple is one of the most visited temples in the district.

The temple of Patteeswarar presents a magnificent sight with five gopurams and three prakarams. It measures 650 feet (200 m) east to west and 295 feet (90 m) south to north. Pattisvara, the presiding form of Shiva manifests himself in the form of Linga, in the central mandapa of the first prakaram. Subsidiary deities like Sapthamatha, Mahalakshmi, Renuka, Navagraha, Surya, Chandra and Bhairava are housed in the inner parts of the temple. Ganesha is represented at three different places in three different forms - Anugai Pillayar, Madhavarna Pillayar and Swarna Vinayagar. In the northern part of the first prakaram, the consort goddess Gnanambigai (Parvati) lies in a separate shrine. A sculpture of Parvati doing penance is also found inside the temple.

The temple is located at Patteswaram, 8 km (5.0 mi) from Kumbakonam in Kumbakonam - Aavoor road, in the South Indian state of Tamil Nadu. The temple has four five-tiered Gopurams (gateway tower) and one seven-tiered tower, which is the principal gateway tower facing East. There are three rectangular precincts, each of which has granite walls of incremental dimensions. The sanctum is approached through the gateway tower, the flag staff, Nandi, Mukha Mandapam and Artha mandapam. Unlike other temples, the shrine of Nandi or the flagstaff are not axial to the sanctum and are located on the side providing a direct view of the sanctum from the gateway tower. From the gateway tower, the shrine of Durga is located on the northern side in the third precinct, which also has a gateway tower axial to the shrine of Durga. There is a gopuram on the southern side, which also houses a temple tank called Pushkarani and the shrine of Mathavarana Pillayar. The sanctum houses the image of Shiva in the form of Lingam (an iconic representation of Shiva). There is a shrine of Somaskanda parallel to the shrine where the metal image of Somaskanda is housed. The precinct around they sanctum houses the image of Dakshinamoorthy, Lingothbhava, Durga and Navagrahas. Unlike other temples, eight of the Navagrahas, the planetary deities are set facing the Sun at the centre. The shrine of Amman is located in the second precinct and has sculpted yali images of different poses. The shrine also houses a scrollwork in the ceiling that also has chains made of stone. The images of Govinda Dikshitar and his wife are housed in the shrine of Amman. There are various sculpted pillars in different parts of the temple indicating various legends associated with the temple and Hindu mythology. During the 1970s, there were three metal images of Nataraja, Somaskanda and Lakshmi were found out from the caves inside the temple - these are housed in Thanjavur Art Gallery. There are six water bodies associated with the temple. Gnavavi is a temple tank located in the third precinct closer to the southern gateway. Koditheertham is the well in the first precinct and Thapas keni is the one opposite to the Amman shrine. Thirumalai rajan river, tank outside the eastern gateway and Gayathri Kulam located on the eastern side of eastern gateway are the other waterbodies.

== Religious importance ==
Om symbol Sapthavigraha Moorthis Om symbol
Saptha Vigraha moorthis are the seven prime consorts in all Shiva temples located at seven cardinal points around the temple
Deity	Temple	Location
Shiva	Mahalingaswamy temple	Tiruvidaimarudur
Vinayaga	Vellai Vinayagar Temple	Thiruvalanchuzhi
Murugan	Swamimalai Murugan temple	Swamimalai
Nataraja	Natarajar temple	Chidambaram
Durga	Thenupuriswarar Temple	Patteswaram
Dakshinamurthy	Apatsahayesvarar Temple	Alangudi
Navagraha	Suryanar Kovil	Suryanar Kovil

The shrine of the goddess Durga is very popular here. Unlike in other temples, Durga here is very soft in look and grace (Shanta Swarupi). Sitting on her vehicle lion, placing the feet on the head of the demon Mahishasura, the goddess appears in a Tribanga stature, eight hands, three eyes and jewels in the ears. Generally, the lion faces right, however the lion here faces the left side. In her hands, the goddess holds, conch, wheel, bow, arrow, sword, shield and a parrot. The temple is counted as one of the temples built on the banks of River Kaveri. It is located on the banks of Kudamurutti, a tributary of river Kaveri.

According to Hindu legend, Mahalingaswamy is the centre of all Shiva temples in the region and the Saptha Vigraha moorthis (seven prime consorts in all Shiva temples) are located at seven cardinal points around the temple, located in various parts of the state. The seven deities are Nataraja in Chidambaram Nataraja Temple at Chidambaram, Chandikeswarar in Tirucheingalur Temple at Tirucheingalur, Vinayagar in Vellai Vinayagar Temple at Thiruvalanchuzhi, Muruga in Swamimalai Murugan Temple at Swamimalai, Bhairava in Sattainathar Temple at Sirkazhi, Navagraha in Sooriyanar Temple at Suryanar Kovil and Dakshinamoorthy in Apatsahayesvarar Temple, Alangudi at Alangudi, Papanasam taluk.

== Festivals and religious practises ==
The temple has six worship practises in day, namely, Ushathkalam at 6 a.m., Kalasanthi at 9 a.m., Uchikalam at 12 p.m., Sayaratchai at 6 p.m., Irandamkalam at 8 p.m. and Arthajamam at 9 p.m. There are three major festivals celebrated in the temple. During the Vaikasi Visagam festival, the festive images of the five principal deities are taken in different vehicles to Thirumalairajan river for Theerthavari. On the return, the images are mounted in Vrishabaga vahana and taken around the streets of Pateeswaram. Muthupandal festival is the major festival in the temple, when the legend of Thirugnangasambandar walking all the way from Thirusakthimutram to the temple in hot sun and with divine grace, a roof made of flower welcomes him to the temple. During the evenings, the festive image of the saint is taken along with the images of the presiding deity around the streets of the temple. During the Margazhi festival, the five principal deities are taken in different mounts and the legend of Rama getting expiation from his curse is enacted.

== See also ==
- Durgai Amman Temple, Patteeswaram
- Swamimalai
- Darasuram
- Oothukadu
- Sathi mutram

== Photogallery ==
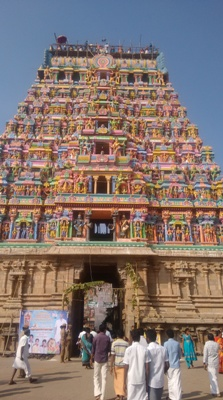
Rajagopuram

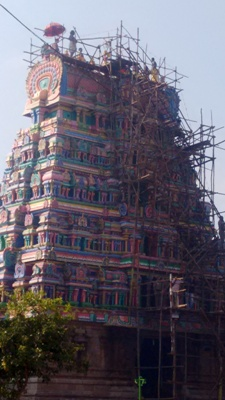
Gopura in the north side

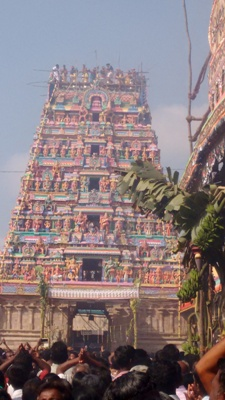
Inner gopura

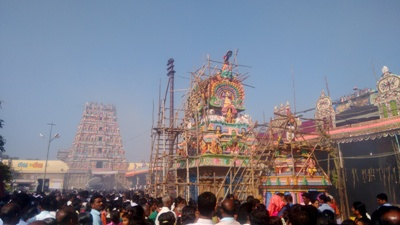
Vinayakar shrine and flagpost

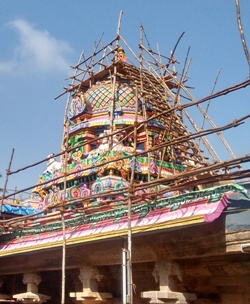
Vimana of the presiding deity

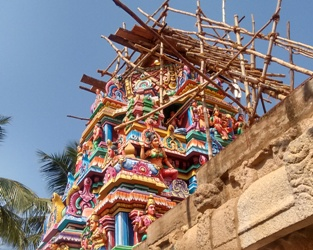
Vimana of the goddess

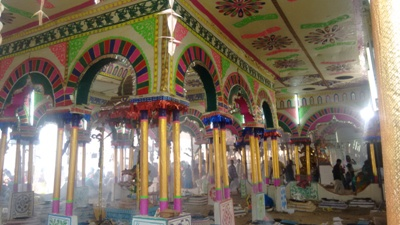
Yagasala
