= Hindu Religious and Charitable Endowments Department =

Department of the Government of Tamil Nadu

Agency overview
- Formed: 1960
- Jurisdiction: Tamil Nadu
- Headquarters: Chennai
- Minister responsible: S. Ramesh, Minister of Hindu Religious and Charitable Endowments Department
- Agency executives: B. Chandra Mohan IAS, Principal Secretary, Department of Tourism, Culture and Religious Endowments; J. Kumara Gurubaran IAS, Commissioner, HR&CE
- Website: hrce.tn.gov.in/hrcehome/index.php

Hindu Religious and Charitable Endowments Department (HR&CE Department) is a department under the Government of Tamil Nadu, India, that handles the administration of temples in the state. Formed under the Tamil Nadu Hindu Religious and Charitable Endowments Act XXII of 1959, the department administers 46,331 properties, including 43,800 Hindu temples, 22 Jain temples, 45 mutts, 69 temples attached to mutts, 1,262 charitable endowments, and 1,133 special endowments across the state.

== History ==
In 1923, the Madras Hindu Religious Endowments Act was passed by Madras Presidency. The legislation was initiated under the Justice Party government; after questions about the technical validity of the original enactment (Madras Act I of 1925), a second comprehensive statute was passed in late 1926 as the Hindu Religious Endowments Act (Madras Act II of 1927), the date by which the Act is known in most later literature.

In 1925, the Government constituted "The Hindu Religious Endowments Board" consisting of a president and two to four commissioners nominated by the government to function as a statutory body, vested with the general superintendence of all religious endowments.

Under the Hindu Religious and Charitable Endowments Act (Madras Act XIX of 1951), the board was replaced by the Hindu Religious and Charitable Endowments (Administration) Department, an executive department of the government, formed in 1952. The statutory framework was revised by Tamil Nadu Hindu Religious and Charitable Endowments Act XXII of 1959 which came into force with effect from 28 April 1960.

Since 1991, religious and spiritual leaders have been involved in the maintenance and administration of the Hindu temples and charitable endowments. However, the maintenance and administration of the Jain temples are under the administration of Jain religious and spiritual leaders.

The act controls 36,425 temples, 56 mathas or religious orders (and 47 temples belonging to mathas), 1,721 specific endowments and 189 trusts.

The department's inception saw numerous companies managing their Public Relations (PR) and Social Media Management. Currently, the responsibility is entrusted to the Chennai-based branding firm, 7 miles per second, overseeing PR and Social Media Management operations.

== Schemes ==
Annadhanam Scheme is conducted in 746 Temples and 50 to 300 devotees are provided with mid-day meals after Uchikala Pooja. Every year Special Rejuvenation camp is held for elephants from temples and mutts across Tamil Nadu and Puducherry. In 2020-2021, the 48-day long camp was held at Thekampatti on the banks of River Bhavani. Spiritual and Moral Instruction classes were conducted in 485 temples by scholars. Various welfare schemes for temple employees and Nathaswara artists were also performed by this department. This department publishes an electronic magazine called Thiru Koil at its official website.

== Temples ==
Below are a few temples maintained by the department.

- Adi Jagannatha Perumal Temple, Thiruppullani
- Adi Kumbeswarar Temple, Kumbakonam
- Adikesava Perumal Temple, Sriperumpudur
- Agniswarar Temple, Kanjanur
- Airavatesvara Temple, Darasuram
- Amritaghateswarar-Abirami Temple, Thirukkadaiyur
- Angala Parameswari Temple, Melmalayanur
- Anjaneya Temple, Nanganallur
- Annamalaiyar Temple, Tiruvannamalai
- Apatsahayesvarar Temple, Alangudi
- Ardhanareeswarar Temple, Tiruchengode
- Mariamman Temple, Samayapuram
- Puliakulam Munthi Vinayagar Temple, Coimbatore
- Solaimalai Murugan Temple, Pazhamudircholai
- Subramaniya Swamy Temple, Thiruparankundram
- Subramanya Swamy Temple, Tiruchendur
- Subramaniya Swamy Temple, Thiruttani
- Swaminatha Swamy Temple, Swamimalai
- Ashtalakshmi Temple, Chennai
- Sangameswarar Temple, Bhavani
- Brahmapureeswarar Temple, Thiruppattur
- Brihadisvara Temple, Gangaikonda Cholapuram
- Brihadisvara Temple, Thanjavur
- Chandra Choodeswarar Temple, Hosur
- Chitragupta Temple, Kanchipuram
- Devanathaswamy temple, Thiruvanthipuram
- Baghavathiamman Temple, Kanyakumari
- Ekambareswarar Temple, Kanchipuram
- Erumbeeswarar Temple, Thiruverumbur
- Jalakandeswarar Temple, Vellore
- Jalantheeswarar Temple, Thakkolam
- Jambukeswarar Temple, Thiruvanaikaval
- Kabartheeswarar Temple, Thiruvalanchuzhi
- Kailasanathar Temple, Thingalur
- Kalikambal Temple, Chennai
- Kallazhagar Temple, Alagar Koyil
- Kamakshi Amman Temple, Mangadu
- Kamakshi Amman Temple, Kanchipuram
- Kampaheswarar Temple, Thirubuvanam
- Kailasanathar Temple, Kanchipuram
- Kandaswami Temple, Georgetown
- Kapaleeshwarar Temple, Chennai
- Karchapeswarar Temple, Kanchipuram
- Karumariamman Temple, Tiruverkadu
- Arulmigu Koniamman Temple, Coimbatore
- Koodal Azhagar Temple, Madurai
- Maha Saraswathi Temple, Koothanur
- Kumarakottam Temple, Kanchipuram
- Mahalingeswarar Temple, Thiruvidaimarudur
- Mangalanatha Swamy Temple, Uthirakosamangai
- Marudhamalai Murugan Temple, Marudhamalai
- Marundeeswarar Temple, Chennai
- Masilamaniswara Temple, Thirumullaivoyal
- Meenakshi Amman Temple, Madurai
- Nagannathaswamy Temple, Keezhaperumpallam
- Anjaneyar Temple, Namakkal
- Narasimhaswamy Temple, Namakkal
- Nellaiappar Temple, Tirunelveli
- Palani Murugan Temple, Palani
- Pandava Thoothar Perumal Temple, Kanchipuram
- Parthasarathy Temple, Chennai
- Perur Pateeswarar Temple, Coimbatore
- Punnainallur Maariamman Temple, Thanjavur
- Rajagopalaswamy Temple, Mannargudi
- Ramanathaswamy Temple, Rameshwaram
- Ranganathaswamy Temple, Karamadai, Coimbatore
- Sarangapani Temple, Kumbakonam
- Sathyanatheswarar Temple, Kanchipuram
- Sattainathar Temple, Sirkazhi
- Shanmughanathar Temple, Kunnakudi
- Navaneetheswarar Temple, Sikkal
- Singaravelan Temple, Sikkal
- Sri Ranganathaswamy Temple, Srirangam
- Vadaranyeswarar Temple, Thiruvalangadu
- Srivilliputhur Andal Temple, Srivilliputhur
- Suryanar Kovil, Kumbakonam
- Swetharanyeswarar Temple, Thiruvenkadu
- Thanumalayaswamy Temple, Suchindrum
- Thayumanaswami Temple, Tiruchirapalli
- Thenupuriswarar Temple, Patteeswaram
- Sthala Sayana Perumal Temple, Mahabalipuram
- Yoga Narasimhar Temple, Sholinghur
- Thirukutralam Temple, Kutralam
- Kandaswamy Temple, Thiruporur
- Thyagaraja Temple, Tiruvarur
- Thyagaraja Temple, Tiruvottiyur
- Vaikunta Perumal Temple, Kanchipuram
- Tirunageswaram Naganathar Temple, Tirunageswaram
- Tirunallar Dharbaranyeswarar Temple, Thirunallar
- Ucchi Pillayar Temple, Tiruchirapalli
- Ulagalantha Perumal Temple, Kanchipuram
- Ulagalantha Perumal Temple, Tirukoyilur
- Uma Maheswarar Temple, Konerirajapuram
- Uppiliappan Temple, Kumbakonam
- Vadapalani Andavar Temple, Chennai
- Vaidyanatha Swamy Temple, Vaitheeswaran Koil
- Subramaniya Swamy Temple, Vallakottai
- Varadharaja Perumal Temple, Kanchipuram
- Vayalur Murugan Temple, Vayalur
- Vedapureeswarar Temple, Thiruverkadu
- Veerateeswarar Temple, Thirukovilur
- Vekkali Amman Temple, Woraiyur
- Virudhagirishwarar Temple, Virudhachalam
- Vijayaraghava Perumal Temple, Kanchipuram

== Ministers ==
Ministers of Hindu Religious and Charitable Endowments(post-independence era)
Name	Portrait	Term of office	
K. Venkataswamy Naidu		10 April 1952	3 February 1954
B. Parameswaran		13 April 1954	13 April 1957
M. Bhaktavatsalam		14 April 1957	5 March 1967
V. R. Nedunchezhiyan		6 March 1967	3 February 1969
K. V. Subbiah		10 February 1969	14 March 1971
M. Kannappan		15 March 1971	31 January 1976
R. M. Veerappan		30 June 1977	9 February 1985
V. V. Swaminathan		7 January 1988	30 January 1998
K. P. Kandasamy		27 January 1989	30 January 1991
M. Ammamuthu Pillai		24 June 1991	12 May 1996
Pulavar Senguttuvan		13 May 1996	13 May 2001
P.C. Ramasamy		14 May 2001	12 May 2006
K. R. Periyakaruppan		13 May 2006	21 May 2011
M. S. M. Anandan		16 May 2011	27 September 2014
P. Chendur Pandian		28 September 2014	25 January 2015
R. Kamaraj		26 January 2015	22 May 2016
Sevvoor S. Ramachandran		23 May 2016	7 May 2021
P. K. Sekar Babu		7 May 2021	5 May 2026
