= Suryanar Kovil =

Navagraha temple in Tamil Nadu

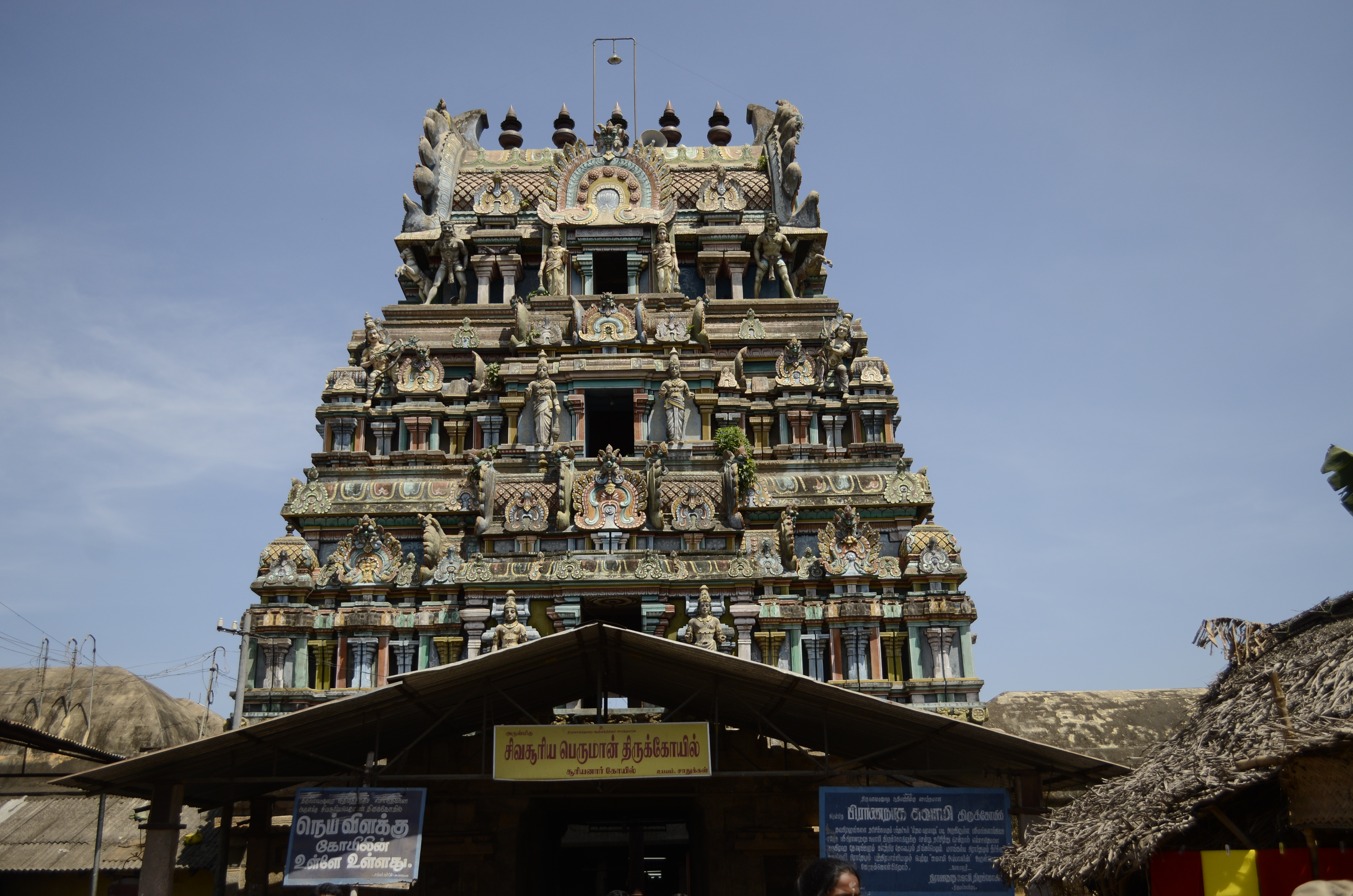

- Location in Tamil Nadu

Religion
- Affiliation: Hinduism
- District: Thanjavur
- Deity: Suryanar (Sun)

Location
- Location: Suryanar Koil, Aduthurai
- State: Tamil Nadu
- Country: India
- Coordinates: 11°1′47″N 79°28′40″E

Architecture
- Type: Chola architecture
- Creator: Kulothunga Chola

Suryanar Kovil (also called Suryanar Temple) is a Hindu temple dedicated to the deity Hindu Sun-God, Surya, located in the village of Suryanar Koil, nearby Aduthurai, Thanjavur District in Tamil Nadu, India. The presiding deity is Suriyanar, the Sun and his consorts Ushadevi and Pratyusha Devi. The temple also has separate shrines for the other eight planetary deities. The temple is considered one of the nine Navagraha temples in Tamil Nadu. The temple is one of the few historic temples dedicated to Sun god and is also the only temple in Tamil Nadu which has shrines for all the planetary deities.

The present masonry structure was built during the reign of Kulottunga Choladeva (1060–1118 CE) in the 11th century with later additions from the Vijayanagar period. Constructed in the Dravidian style of architecture, the temple has a five-tiered rajagopuram, the gateway tower and a granite wall enclosing all the shrines of the temple.

It is believed that the planetary deities were cursed by Brahma to dwell in Vellurukku Vanam, the white wild flower jungle and were blessed by Shiva to make it their abode to devotees. The temple has six daily rituals at various times from 5:30 a.m. to 9 p.m., and two yearly festivals on its calendar. The temple is maintained and administered by the Hindu Religious and Charitable Endowments Department of the Government of Tamil Nadu.

== Legend ==
Per the Hindu legend, sage Kalava was suffering from serious ailments along with leprosy. He prayed to the Navagrahas, the nine planet deities. The planets were pleased by his devotion and offered cure to the sage. Brahma, the Hindu god of creation, was angered as he felt that the planets have no powers to provide boons to humans. He cursed the nine planets to suffer from leprosy and were sent down to earth in Vellurukku Vanam, the white wild flower jungle. The planets prayed to Shiva to relieve them off the curse. Shiva appeared to them and said that the place belonged to them and they would have to grace the devotees worshipping them from the place. This is the only temple where there are separate shrines for each of the planet deities. It is also the only temple among the nine planetary temples where Shiva is not the presiding deity.

== History ==
It is stated in one of the inscriptions found in the temple that it was built in the reign of Kulottunga Choladeva (1060–1118 CE) and was called Kulottungachola-Marttandalaya. In modern times, the temple is maintained and administered by the Hindu Religious and Charitable Endowments Department of the Government of Tamil Nadu. The temple is mentioned in the songs of Muthuswami Dikshitar, who has composed a song starting with "Suryamurthe" in Saurashatra ragam.

== Architecture ==
Suriyanar Temple is located at the distance of 15 km from Kumbakonam in west, 22 km from Mayiladuthurai in east, 2 km from Aduthurai, 8 km from Thiruppanandal and 58 km (36 mi) from Thanjavur. The temple can be accessed by road through Aduthurai in Kumbakonam–Mayiladuthurai road and Thiruppanandal in Kumbakonam–Chennai road. The temple has a rectangular plan with compound walls, pierced by a five-tiered raja gopuram (entrance tower). The central shrine is of Surya, the Sun God, is built on an elevated structure. The central shrine houses the image of Surya and his consorts Usha and Chhaya. The hall leading to the central shrine has images of Viswanathar, Visalakshi, Nataraja, Sivakami, Vinayagar and Murugan. On the axial line in front of the central shrine, there is an image of Guru (Jupiter), one of the planetary deities. There are separate shrines for all the other seven planet deities namely Budha (Mercury), Shani (Saturn), Sukran (Venus), Soma (Moon), Angaragan (Mars), Rahu and Ketu. All the other eight shrines of the Navagrahas are arranged facing the shrine of Suryanar. Guru is depicted performing pooja to Shiva.

== Worship and festivals ==
Om symbol Sapthavigraha Moorthis Om symbol
Saptha Vigraha moorthis are the seven prime consorts in all Shiva temples located at seven cardinal points around the temple
Deity	Temple	Location
Shiva	Mahalingaswamy temple	Tiruvidaimarudur
Vinayaga	Vellai Vinayagar Temple	Thiruvalanchuzhi
Murugan	Swamimalai Murugan temple	Swamimalai
Nataraja	Natarajar temple	Chidambaram
Durga	Thenupuriswarar Temple	Patteswaram
Guru	Apatsahayesvarar Temple	Alangudi
Navagraha	Suryanar Kovil	Suryanar Kovil

The temple priests perform the pooja (rituals) during festivals and on a daily basis. Like other Shiva temples of Tamil Nadu, the priests belong to the Shaivaite community, a Brahmin sub-caste. The temple rituals are performed six times a day; Ushathkalam at 5:30 a.m., Kalasanthi at 8:00 a.m., Uchikalam at 10:00 a.m., Sayarakshai at 6:00 p.m., Irandamkalam at 8:00 p.m. and Ardha Jamam at 10:00 p.m. Each ritual comprises four steps: abhisheka (sacred bath), alangaram (decoration), neivethanam (food offering) and deepa aradanai (waving of lamps) for Surya, Usha and Chhaya. The worship is held amidst music with nadaswaram (pipe instrument) and tavil (percussion instrument), religious instructions in the Vedas read by priests and prostration by worshippers in front of the temple mast. There are weekly rituals like somavaram and sukravaram, fortnightly rituals like pradosham and monthly festivals like amavasai (new moon day), kiruthigai, pournami (full moon day) and sathurthi.

== Religious importance ==
The temple is one of the nine Navagraha temples of Tamil Nadu and is a part of the popular Navagraha pilgrimage in the state - it houses the image of Surya (Sun). The planets are believed to influence the horoscope computed based on time of one's birth and subsequently influence the course of life. Each of the planets are believed to move from a star to another during a predefined period and thus sway over an individual's fortunes. Kol vinay theertha Vinayagar is an important deity inside the temple and should be worshiped first before worshiping Lord Suriyan and other planets . The Navagrahas, as per Hindu customs, are believed to provide both good and bad effects for any individual and the bad effects are mitigated by prayers. As in other Navagraha temples, the common worship practises of the devotees include offering of cloth, grains, flowers and jewels specific to the planet deity. Lighting a set of lamps is also commonly followed in the temple. As per contemporary Saivite belief, the energies distributed cyclically by Navagrahas can be channeled based on remedial measures. As per local legends, Shiva, the overlord of the nine planetary deities, allowed them to freely grant wishes based on devotion of the devotees.

According to Hindu legend, Mahalingaswamy is the centre of all Shiva temples in the region and the Saptha Vigraha moorthis (seven prime consorts in all Shiva temples) are located at seven cardinal points around the temple, located in various parts of the state. The seven deities are Nataraja in Chidambaram Nataraja Temple at Chidambaram, Chandikeswarar temple at Tirucheingalur, Vinayagar in Vellai Vinayagar Temple at Thiruvalanchuzhi, Muruga in Swamimalai Murugan Temple at Swamimalai, Bhairava in Sattainathar Temple at Sirkali, Navagraha in this temple and Dakshinamoorthy in Apatsahayesvarar Temple at Alangudi, Nannilam. The temple is counted as one of the temples built on the northern banks of River Kaveri.
