= Kabartheeswarar Temple =

Hindu temple in Tamil Nadu, India

Kapartheeswarar Temple
- Vellai Vinayakar Koil
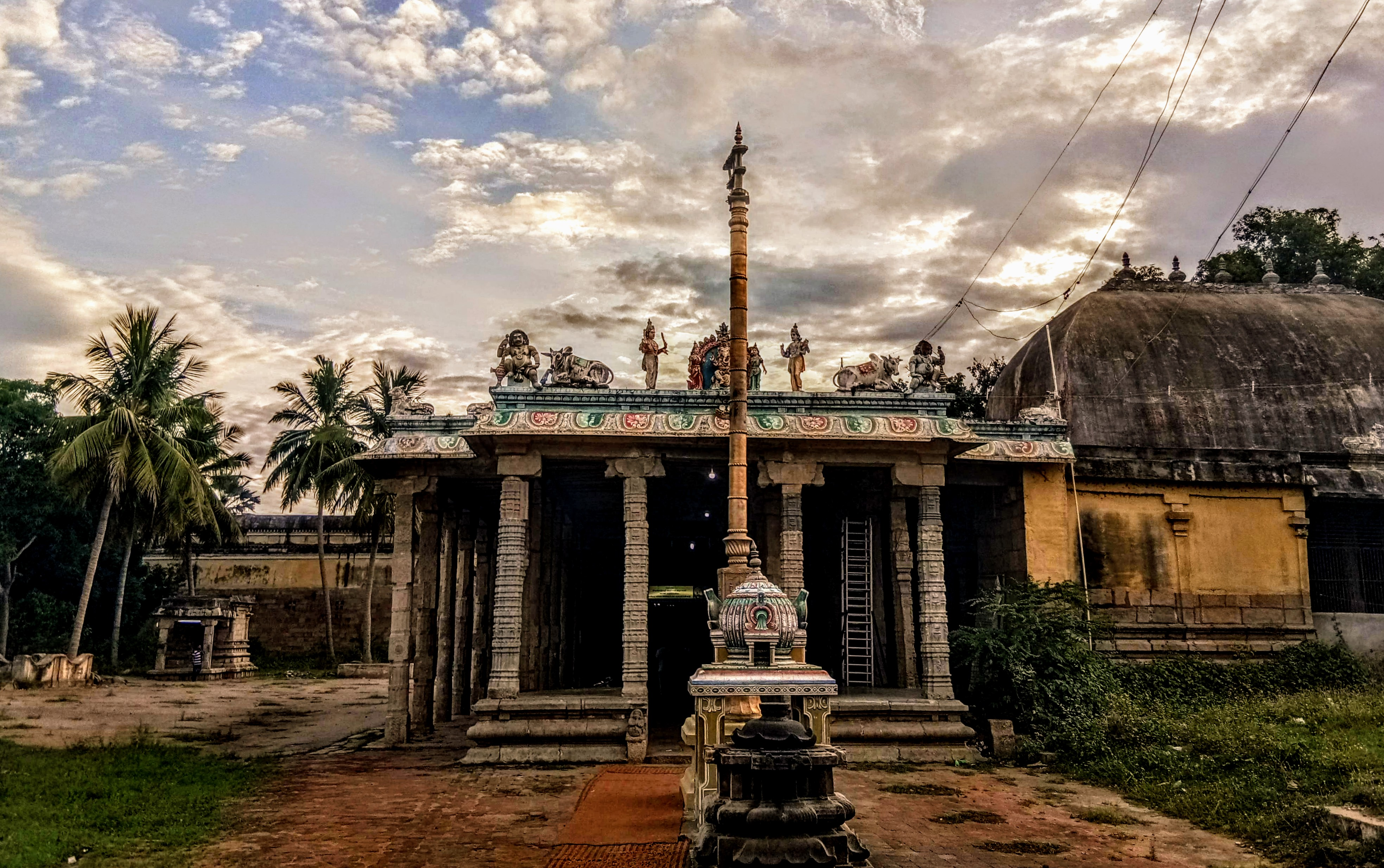

- Location in Tamil Nadu

Religion
- Affiliation: Hinduism
- District: Thanjavur
- Deity: Kapardeeshwarar(Shiva), Swetha Vinayagar(Ganesha)

Location
- Location: Tiruvalajuli (near Swamimalai)
- State: Tamil Nadu
- Country: India
- Coordinates: 10°57′N 79°19′E

Architecture
- Type: Dravidian architecture
- Creator: Cholas and Tanjai Nayak Kings

Kapardeeswarar temple (also called Swetha Vinayagar Temple, Vellai Vinayagar temple, Valanchuzinathar temple) is a Hindu temple situated in the village of Thiruvalanchuzhi (also spelt as Thiruvalanjuli) near Swamimalai in Kumbakonam taluk of Thanjavur district, Tamil Nadu, India. Shiva is worshiped as Kapardeeswarar and is represented by the lingam and his consort Parvati is depicted as Brihannayagi. The presiding deity is revered in the 7th century Tamil Saiva canonical work, the Tevaram, written by Tamil poet saints known as the nayanars and classified as Paadal Petra Sthalam.

There are many inscriptions associated with the temple indicating contributions from Cholas, Thanjai Nayaks Kings. The oldest parts of the present masonry structure were built during the Chola dynasty, while later expansions, are attributed to later periods, up to the Thanjai Nayaks during the 16th century.

The temple complex is one of the largest in the state and it houses a seven-tiered gateway towers known as gopurams. The temple has numerous shrines, with those of Kapardeeswarar and Swetha Vinayagar being the most prominent. The temple complex houses many halls and three precincts; the most notable is the shrine of Swetha Vinayagar that has many sculptures. The temple has six daily rituals at various times from 6:00 a.m. to 8:30 p.m., and many yearly festivals on its calendar. The temple is maintained and administered by Hindu Religious and Charitable Endowments Department of the Government of Tamil Nadu.

== Legend ==
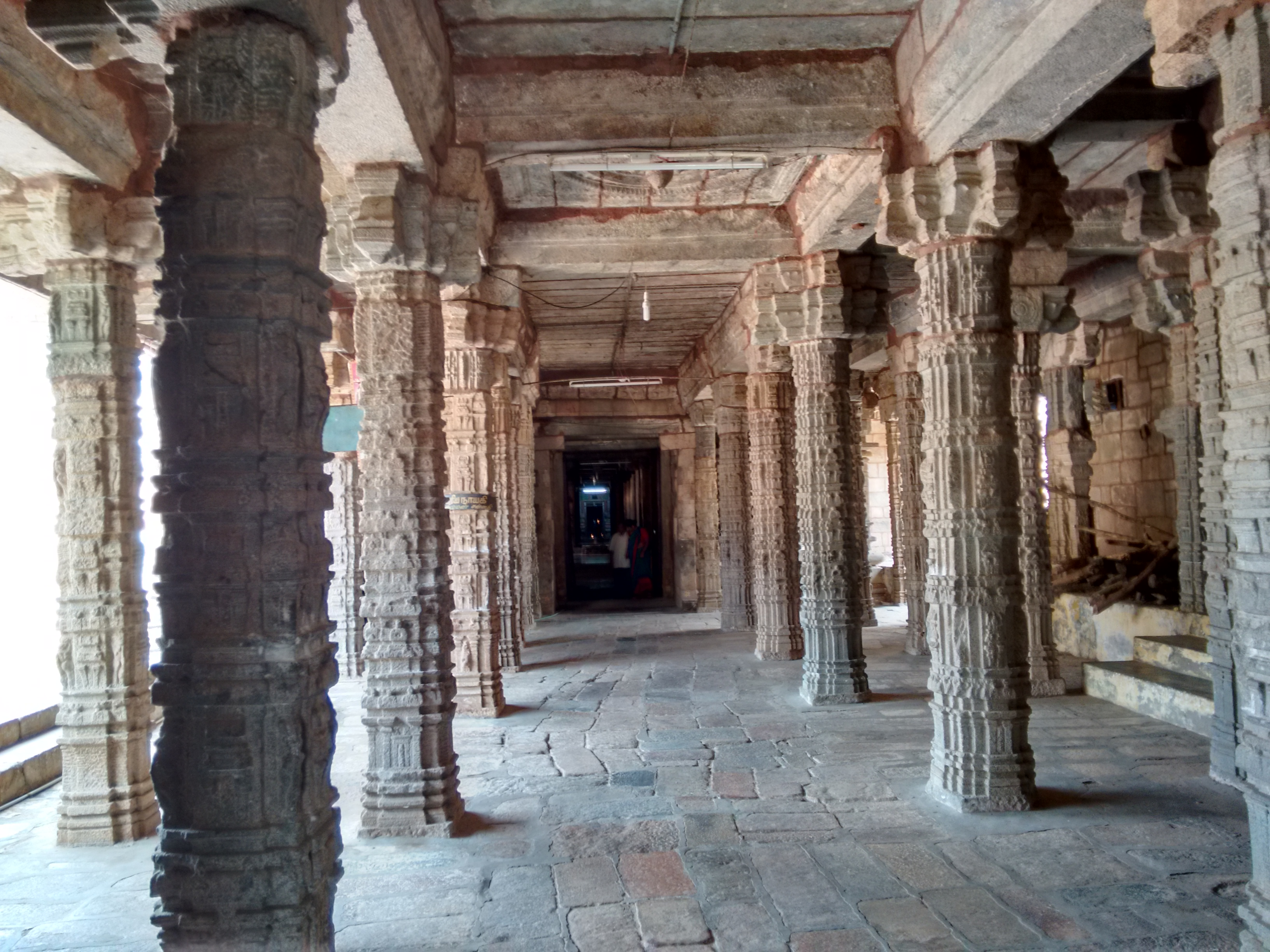
Image of Swetha Vinayagar shrine

The temple is associated with a sage called Herandar, who, according to legend, is believed to have gone through an underground passage to the nether world and brought the Kaveri River to the earth to flow into the Bay of Bengal. Since the river took a convoluted direction in its flow, the place is called Tiruvalanjuzhi. There is an image of Herandar in the temple and the trunk of the elephant-headed god, Ganesha (Vinayagar) swirls towards the right. The presence of Buddhist images from the Chola period in the temple show influence of Buddhist tradition in the region.

The temple is renowned for its shrine dedicated to Ganesha (Vinayagar, Vinayaka). The idol of Vinayaka is white in colour and is believed to have been created out of sea foam (kadal norai). Hence, the temple is also known as Swetha Vinayagar Temple in Sanskrit or Vellai Vinayakar Temple in Tamil, meaning "the temple of the white Vinayaka".

According to popular legend, Indra, the king of the Devas created the idol of Ganesha out of sea foam during the churning of the ocean and left it in a niche in the temple hoping to get back the idol sometime later. But later, when he returned to remove the idol of Ganesha, it would not budge. So, the idol was allowed to remain where it was. A lattice-worked stone window pane called palahani is present in the temple. The temple is originally believed to have been built by Kanaka Chola in prehistoric times.

As per another legend, when Devas (celestial deities) and Asuras (demons) were churning the Ocean of milk with Vasuki the serpent, they disregarded the advice of Vinayaka. It resulted in the spilling of poison in Amruta. To propitiate, the Devas created an image of Vinayaga with sea foam and worshipped him at the place. The image of the presiding deity is white in colour on account of the belief. The temple priests do not conduct abhishekham and pour any liquids over the deity for this reason.

== History ==
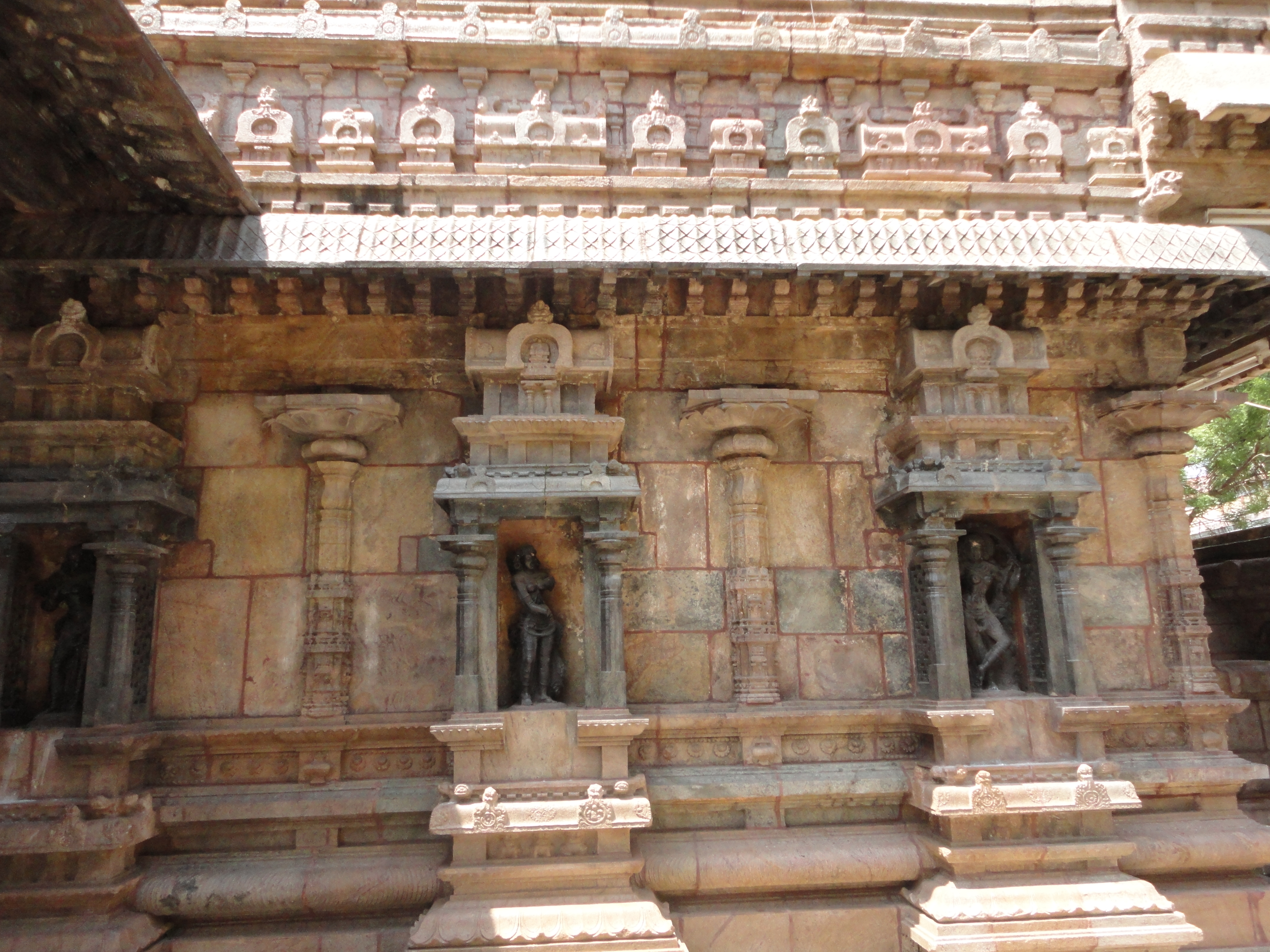
Intricate sculptures on the temple walls

The central temple, according to historian Subramanyan, is an early Chola temple as seen from the inscription (ARE 620 of 1902) made during the reign of Rajaraja I (985–1014 CE) indicating grants made during the 38th regnal year of Madiraikonda Parakesarivarman. One another inscription on the south wall of the mandapa in front of the sanctum dated to Rajaraja indicates grant of land on the 21st year of the rule of Parakesarivarman. An inscription (ARE 633 of 1902) during the 25th regnal year of Rajaraja indicates gift of gold to the deity by Kundavai, the daughter of the king. Another inscription dated to the 258th day during the 24th regnal year of Rajaraja on the south wall of the hall indicates tax free land to the service of two deities, namely, Kshetrapalar and Ganapatiyar. The inscription on the north wall of the hall (ARE 633-B of 1902) dated to the third regnal year of Rajendra I (1012–1044 CE) indicates that he ceremonially passed through a hill of gingely seeds and gifted twelve gold flowers to the feet of Lord. The same inscription indicates gold flowers gifted by his queen Valavan Mahadeviar. Another inscription from the northern wall of Bhairavar shrine during the third regnal year of Rajendra I indicates gift of two gold flowers to the deity by Danti Sakti Vitanki while he was performing Tulabhara at Thiruvisanallur. An inscription from the 11th regnal year of Rajaraja III (1216–1256 CE) indicate that the shrine of Vanduvarkuzhali Amman might have possibly been installed during his reign.

The last inscription mentioning a medieval Chera king of Kerala, either from Kerala or Tamil Nadu, is found on south wall of the mandapa in front of the central shrine in Kabartheeswara Temple (dated in the regnal year of his overlord Vikrama Chola). It also mentions certain Kizhan Adikal or the Chera princess.

== Architecture ==
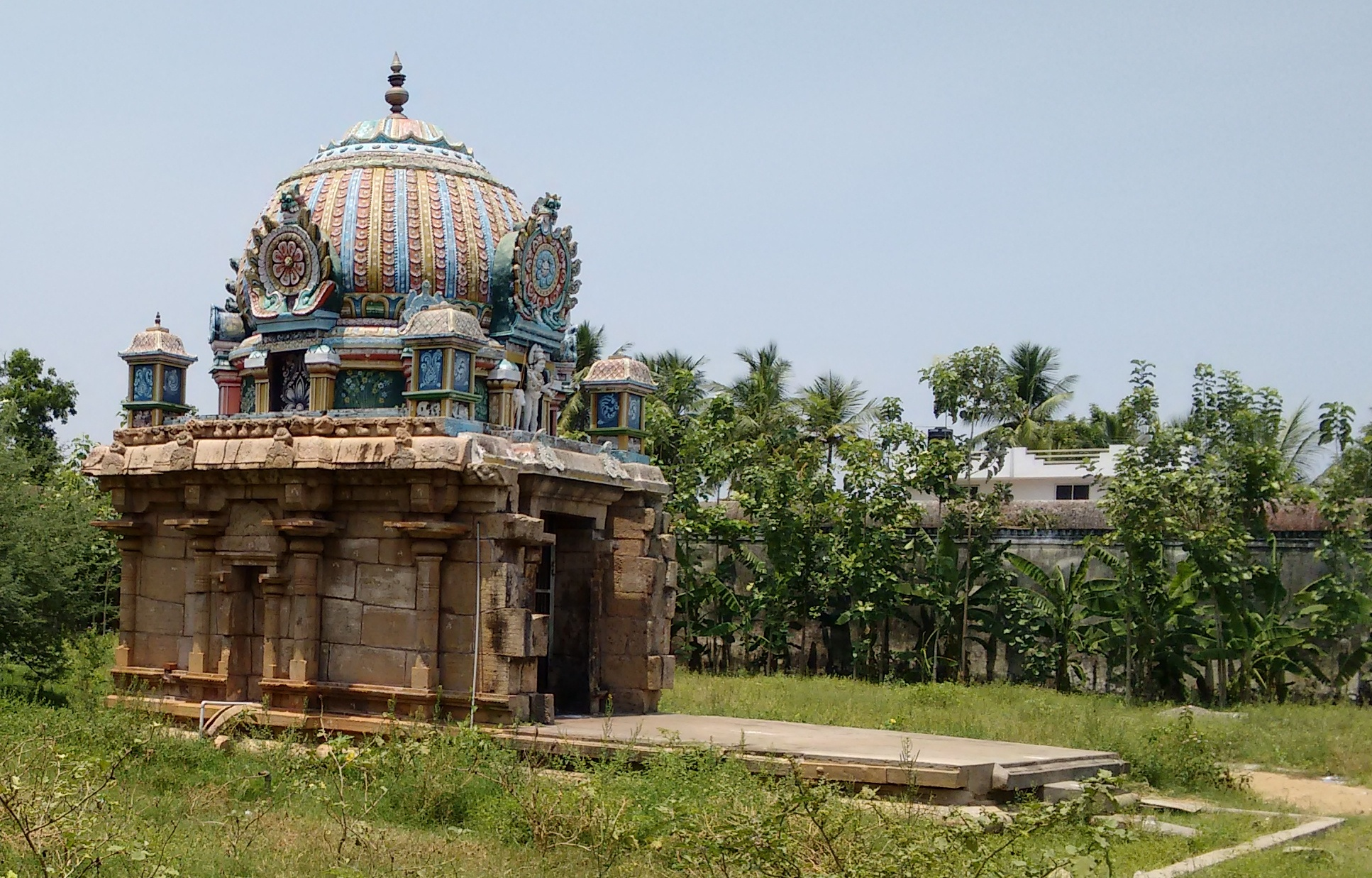
Image of Bhairavar shrine

The west facing temple has a seven-tiered gopura, the gateway tower and has three precincts. The outermost precinct houses the temple tank on the southwest and there is a Bhairava shrine in the northe east in the outermost precinct. The Bhairava shrine is believed to have been built by Loga Mahadevi, the queen of Rajaraja III. The presence of Buddhist images from the Chola period in the temple show influence of Buddhist tradition in the region. The outermost precinct also houses a shrine dedicated to Kshetrapala Devar in the southeast. The second precinct has the shrine of Swetha Vinayagar with artistic pillared halls. The shrine is located in the middle and axial to the gateway tower and the sanctum. The central shrine houses the image of Kabardeeswarar in the form of Linga. The sanctum is square in shape and measures 4.64 m (15.2 ft). The Kshetrapalar is a finely chiseled image measuring 1.65 m (5.4 ft) in height and .85 m (2.8 ft) across the chest. The ardhamandapa, the hall preceding the sanctum projects 4.24 m (13.9 ft) forward and has the same width as the sanctum. The mukhamandapa, the following halls of ardhamandapa measures 6.95 m (22.8 ft) by 6.85 m (22.5 ft). On the outer part of the structures are niches housing Vishnu in the west and Bhairava in the east. The vimana, the structure over the sanctum is semicircular. The halls around the first precinct houses various images and series of Lingams. The southeast corner houses the Valanchuzhi Vinayagar shrine was built by Tanjai Nayak Kings, after which the temple has got one of its names.

== Religious importance ==
Om symbol Sapthavigraha Moorthis Om symbol
Saptha Vigraha moorthis are the seven prime consorts in all Shiva temples located at seven cardinal points around the temple
Deity	Temple	Location
Shiva	Mahalingaswamy temple	Tiruvidaimarudur
Vinayaga	Vellai Vinayagar Temple	Thiruvalanchuzhi
Murugan	Swamimalai Murugan temple	Swamimalai
Nataraja	Natarajar temple	Chidambaram
Durga	Thenupuriswarar Temple	Patteswaram
Guru	Apatsahayesvarar Temple	Alangudi
Navagraha	Suryanar Kovil	Suryanar Kovil

According to a Hindu legend, Mahalingaswamy at Thiruvidaimarudur is the centre of all Shiva temples in the region and the Saptha Vigraha moorthis (seven prime consorts in all Shiva temples) are located at seven cardinal points around the temple, located in various parts of the state. The seven deities are Nataraja in Chidambaram Nataraja Temple at Chidambaram, Chandikeswarar temple at Tirucheingalur, Vinayagar in Thiruvalanchuzhi Kabardeeshwarar Temple, Muruga in Swamimalai Murugan Temple at Swamimalai, Bhairava in Sattainathar Temple at Sirkali, Navagraha in Sooriyanar Temple at Suryanar Kovil and Dakshinamoorthy in Apatsahayesvarar Temple, Alangudi at Alangudi, Papanasam taluk. The temple is counted as one of the temples built on the banks of River Kaveri. The river takes a sharp turn at this place and hence the place is called Thiruvalanchuzhi.

== Literary mention ==
It is one of the 275 Paadal Petra Sthalams - Shiva Sthalams glorified in the early medieval Tevaram poems by Tamil Saivite Nayanar saints Tirunavukkarasar and Thirugnana Sambandar. Tirunavukkarasar describes the feature of the deity of Tiruvalanchuzhi and Kottaiyur as:

பொடியாடு மேனிப் புனிதன் கண்டாய் புட்பாகற் காழி கொடுத்தான் கண்டாய்

இடியார் கடுமுழக்கே றூர்ந்தான் கண்டாய் எண்டிசைக்கும் விக்காகி நின்றான் கண்டாய்
மடலார் திரைபுரளுங் காவிரி வாய் வலஞ்சுழியின் மேவிய மைந்தன் கண்டாய்

கொடியாடு நெடுமாடக் கொட்டை யூரிற் கோடீச் சரத்துறையுங் கோமான் தானே.

== Kumbakonam Sapta Stana Temple ==
This is one of the Saptha Stana Temples of Kumbakonam. During the Mahahaman of 2016 the palanquin festival was held on 7 February 2016. Following the tirttavari held at Mahamaham tank on 21 April 2016, the palanquin festival of the Sapta Stana Temples were held on 23 April 2016. The festival which started from Kumbesvara Temple at the 7.30 p.m. of 23 April 2016 completed on the morning of 25 April 2016 after going to the following temples.

- Adi Kumbeswarar Temple, Kumbakonam
- Amirthakadeswarar Temple, Sakkottai
- Avudainathar Temple, Darasuram
- Kabartheeswarar Temple
- Kottaiyur Kodeeswarar Temple
- Kailasanathar Temple, Melakaveri
- Swaminatha Swamy Temple

== See also ==
- Thanjavur Vellai Vinayakar Temple
