= Satyagireeswarar Temple, Senganur =

Hindu temple in Tamil Nadu, India

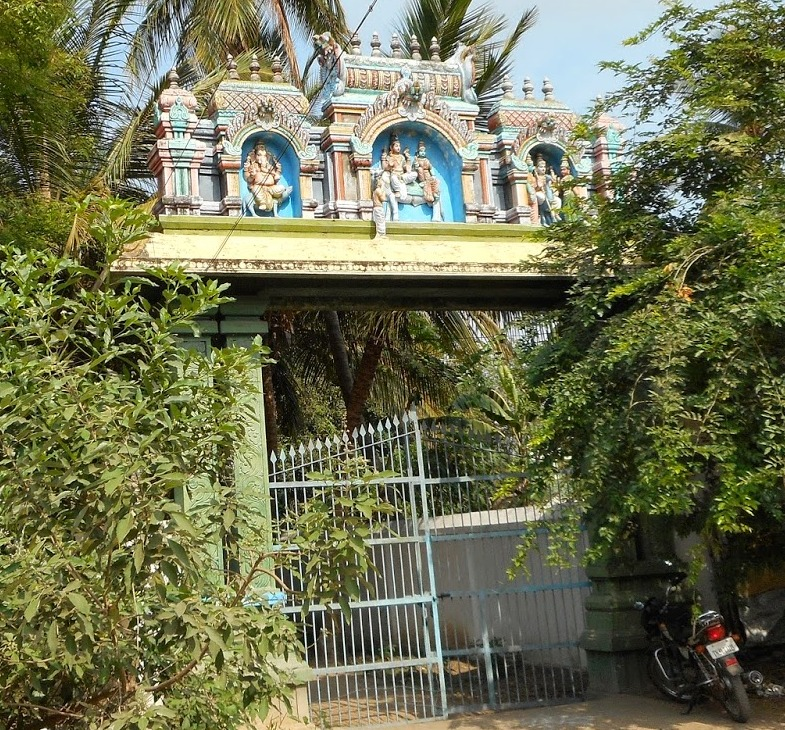

Religion
- Affiliation: Hinduism
- District: Thanjavur district
- Deity: Lord Shiva

Location
- Location: Senganur
- State: Tamil Nadu
- Country: India
- Interactive map of Satyagireeswarar Temple, Senganur

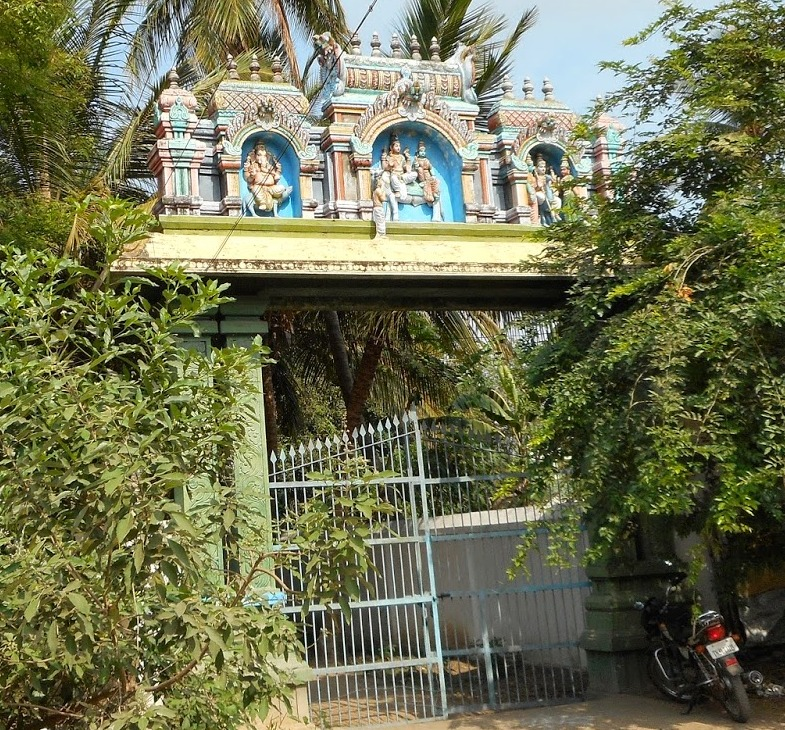
The entrance of the temple

Sathyagireeswarar Temple (Tamil: சத்தியகிரீஸ்வரர் கோயில், செங்கனூர்) is a Hindu temple located at Senganur in the Thiruvidaimarudur taluk of Thanjavur district, Tamil Nadu, India. The historical name of the place is Seignalur.

== Location ==
Senganur is located at a distance of 16 kilometres from Kumbakonam on the road to Chennai.

== Significance ==
It is one of the shrines of the 275 Paadal Petra Sthalams - Shiva Sthalams glorified in the early medieval Tevaram poems by Tamil Saivite Nayanar Tirugnanasambandar.Hymns in praise of the deity have been sung by Arunagirinathar and Sekkizhar. The temple finds mention in Sekkizhar's Periapuranam.

Main Deity: Sakthigireeswarar or Sakthigiriswarar as written in the Temple itself or Sathyagireeswarar as popularly known Consort: Saki Devi

According to Hindu legend, Mahalingaswamy at Thiruvidaimarudur is the centre of all Shiva temples in the region and the Saptha Vigraha moorthis (seven prime consorts in all Shiva temples) are located at seven cardinal points around the temple, located in various parts of the state. The seven deities are Nataraja in Chidambaram Nataraja Temple at Chidambaram, Satyagireeswarar_Temple, Senganur also known as Chandikeswarar temple at Tirucheingalur, Vinayagar in Vellai Vinayagar Temple at Thiruvalanchuzhi, Muruga in Swamimalai Murugan Temple at Swamimalai, Bhairava in Sattainathar Temple at Sirkali, Navagraha in Sooriyanar Temple at Suryanar Kovil and Dakshinamoorthy in Apatsahayesvarar Temple, Alangudi at Alangudi, Valaingaman taluk, Thiruvarur.

Senganur is the birthplace of the Saivite saint Chandesha Nayanar as well as the Vaishnavite philosopher Acharya Periyavachan Pillai.

(Sthalam 41)
