= Sattainathar Temple, Sirkazhi =

Temple in Tamil Nadu, India

Sattainathar Temple
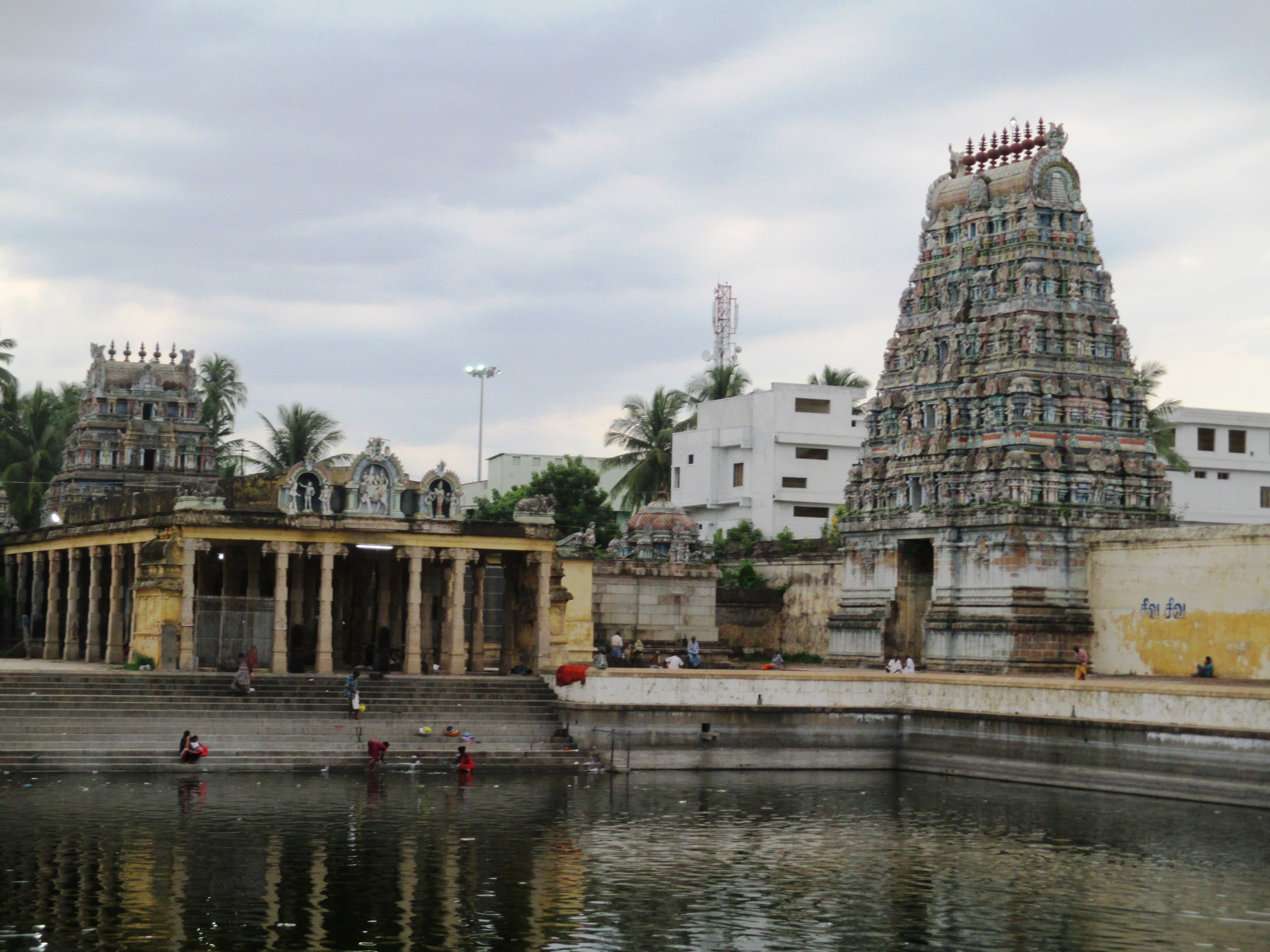
- Gopuram of the temple

- Location in Tamil Nadu

Religion
- Affiliation: Hinduism
- District: Mayiladuthurai
- Deity: Sattainathar(Shiva), Bhramapureeswarar, Thoniappar Periyanayagi(Parvathi)

Location
- Location: Sirkali
- State: Tamil Nadu
- Country: India
- Coordinates: 11°14′N 79°44′E

Architecture
- Type: Dravidian architecture

Sattainathar temple, Sirkazhi (also called Brahmapureeswarar temple and Thoniappar temple) is a Hindu temple dedicated to Shiva located in Sirkali, Mayiladuthurai district, Tamil Nadu, India. The temple is incarnated by the hymns of Thevaram and is classified as Paadal Petra Sthalam. It is an ancient temple complex with three different Shiva shrines in three stories.

The Bhramapureeswarar shrine is housed in the lower level. Brahmapureeswarar is accompanied by Ambal Sthira sundari/Thiripurasundari or Thirunilainayaki in Tamil. The second-level houses Periyanakar with Periyanayaki on a Thoni, hence the name Thoniappar. Sattainathar/Vatukanathar is also housed here. There are 22 water bodies associated with this shrine. Three different forms of Shiva are worshipped here, the Shivalingam (Bhrammapureeswarar), a colossal image of Uma Maheswarar (Toniappar) at the medium level, and Bhairavar (Sattanathar) at the upper level. The temple is associated with the legend of child Sambandar who is believed to have been fed by Parvathi on the banks of the temple tank. The child later went on to compose Tevaram, a Saiva canonic literature on Shiva and became one of the most revered Saiva poets in South India.

== Etymology and origin ==
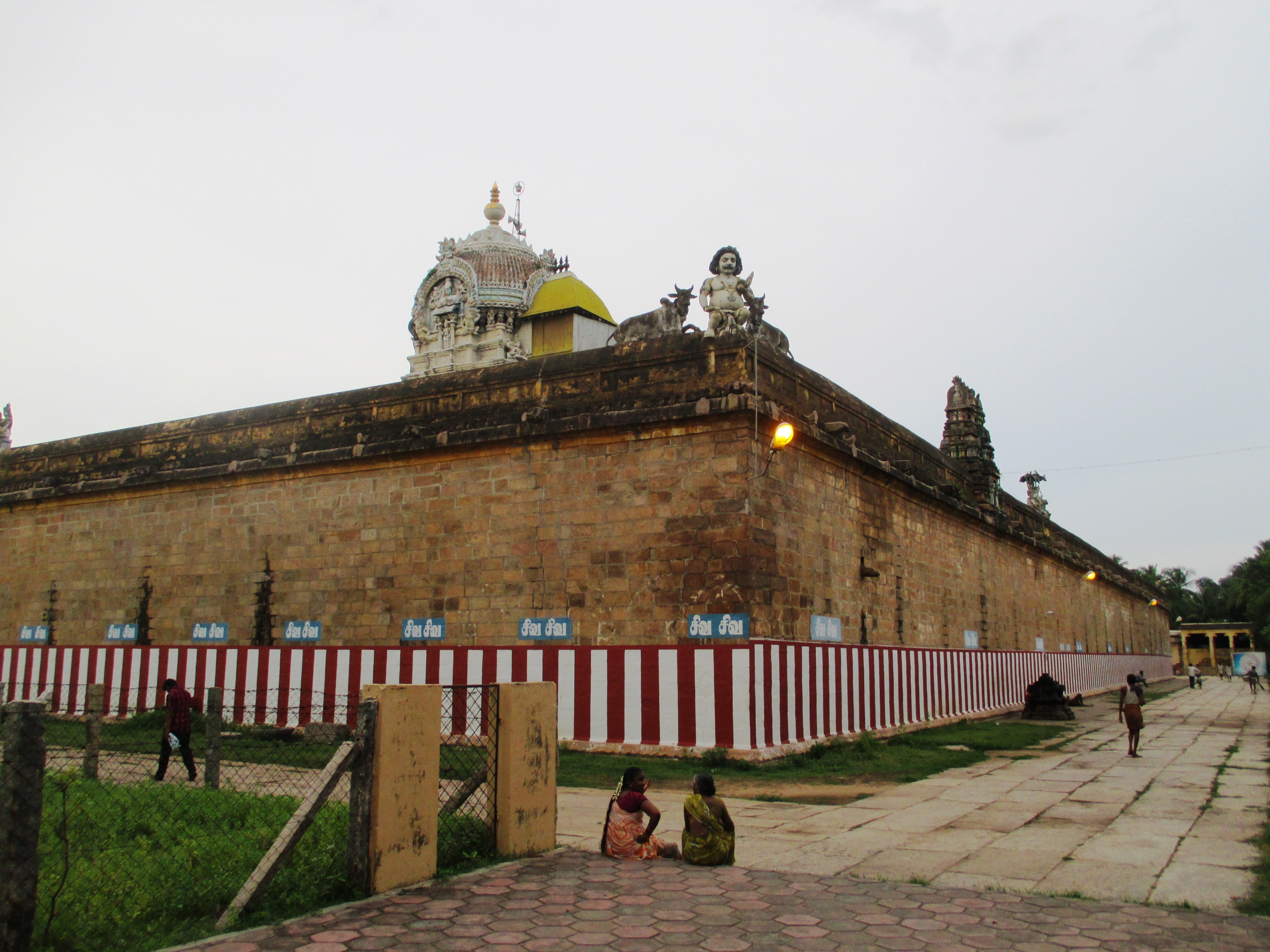
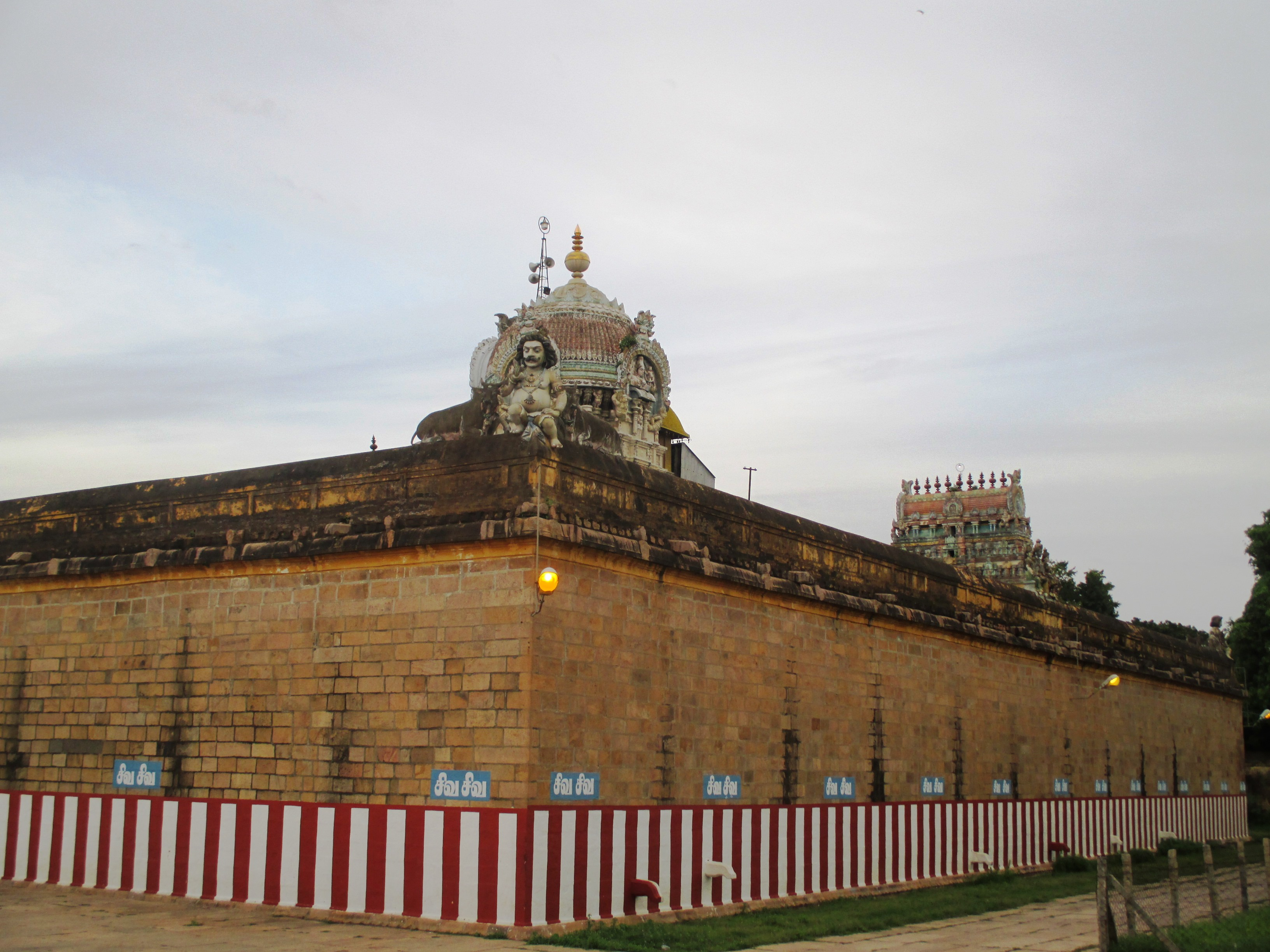
Walls of the temple around the third precinct

In ancient times, this town had twelve different names, including Brahmapuram, Venupuram, Thonipuram, Kazhumalam, Pugali, Sirkazhiswaram and Shri Kali. As per popular belief, Kali is believed to have worshipped the presiding deity, Brahmapureeswarar, and thus the place came to be known as Srikalipuram, which went on to become Shiyali.

According to Tamil legend, during one of the biggest deluges that submerged the planet earth, Tamil god Shiva is said to have carried the 64 arts on a raft (called Thoni in Tamil). The presiding deity in the temple, Shiva, is thus called "Thoniappar" (the one who carried the raft) and the region is called "Thonipuram". The Hindu god Brahma is believed to have worshiped Shiva here, giving the name "Bhramapureeswarar" (the one worshipped by Brahma) and so the region is also referred as "Bhramapureeswaram". The town is thus called "Sattainathapuram", which in modern times, is a suburb within Sirkazhi. The town was known as "Kalumalam" during the early Chola period. Thirugnanasambandar, the seventh century Saiva nayanar, as an infant is believed to have been fed with the milk of wisdom by the divine mother Parvati on the banks of the temple tank. The child Sambandar started singing the anthology of Tevaram hymns from then on, commencing with "Todudaiya Seviyan". Sambandar refers the town as "Kazhi" in his verses. It was called Shiyali during British rule, and after Independence, it was renamed "Sirkazhi".

The temple is maintained by Dharmapuram Adheenam, a Saivite mutt or monastic institution located in the town of Mayiladuthurai, India. As of 1987, there were a total of 27 Shiva temples under the control of the adheenam.

== Architecture ==
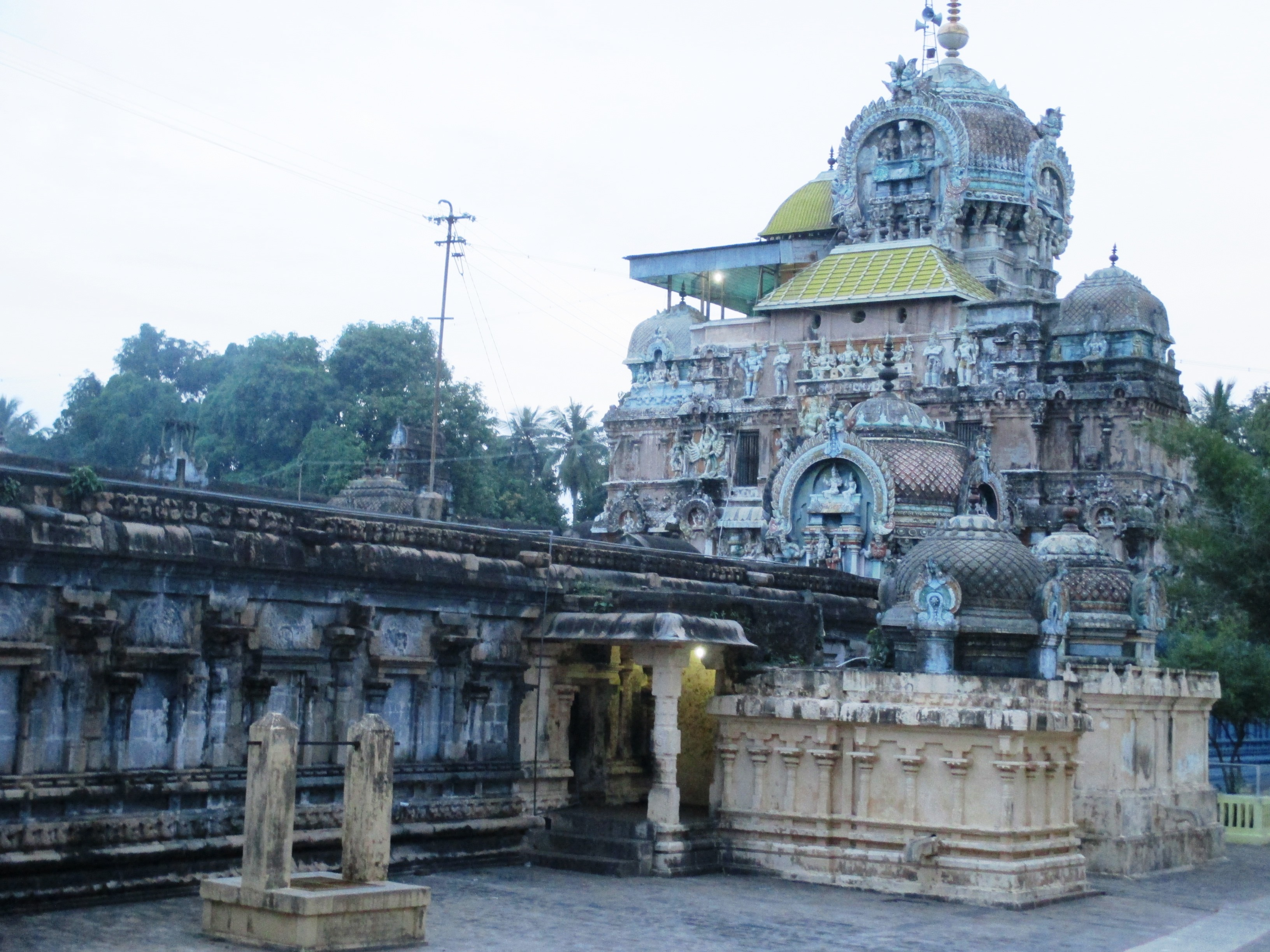
The central shrine with three levels

The temple has a vast Prakarams (courtyards) with high walls of enclosure. There are two sets of seven-tiered gopurams on the outer walls of the enclosure. The porch on the entrance from the second to the first prakara date back to 10th to 11th century. The original shrine during the period of the Nayanmars included the shrine of Bhrammapureeswarar, on the southern bund of the temple tank; the Tonniappar shrine on a mound west of the central shrine, and the Sattanathar shrine in the second floor reached from the southern praharam(outer courtyard) of the Toniappar shrine by a flight of steps. The enlargement of the original temple happened during the period of Kulothunga Chola I, Vikrama Chola, Kulothunga Chola II and Kulothunga Chola III (as in Chidambaram - 11th through the 13th centuries). The temple is a holy site for Hinduism and thousands of devotees come to pay homage to the deities. The image of Parvathi in the form of Sthira Sundari is located in the basement in a separate shrine.

== Tirugnana Sambandar ==
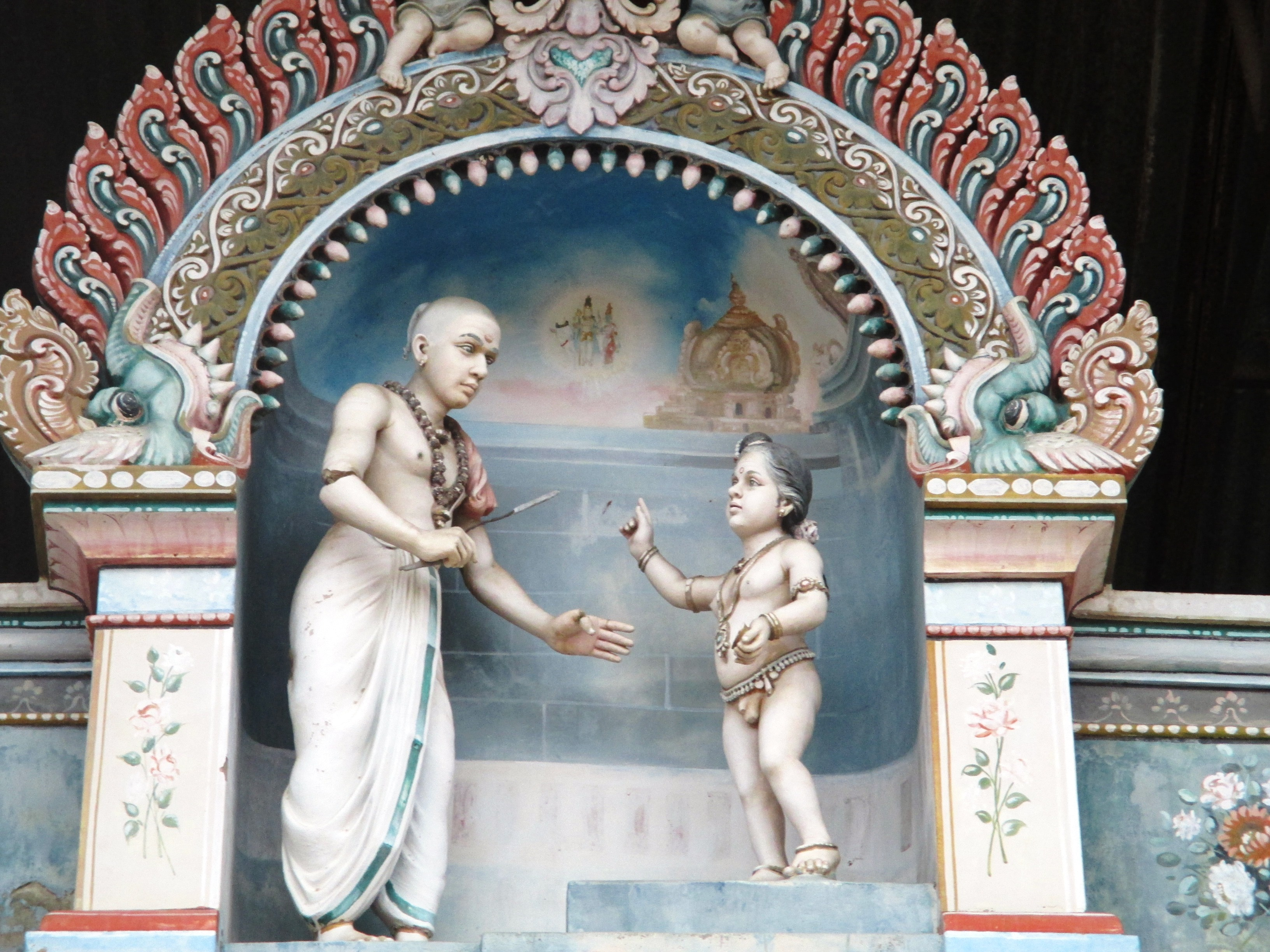
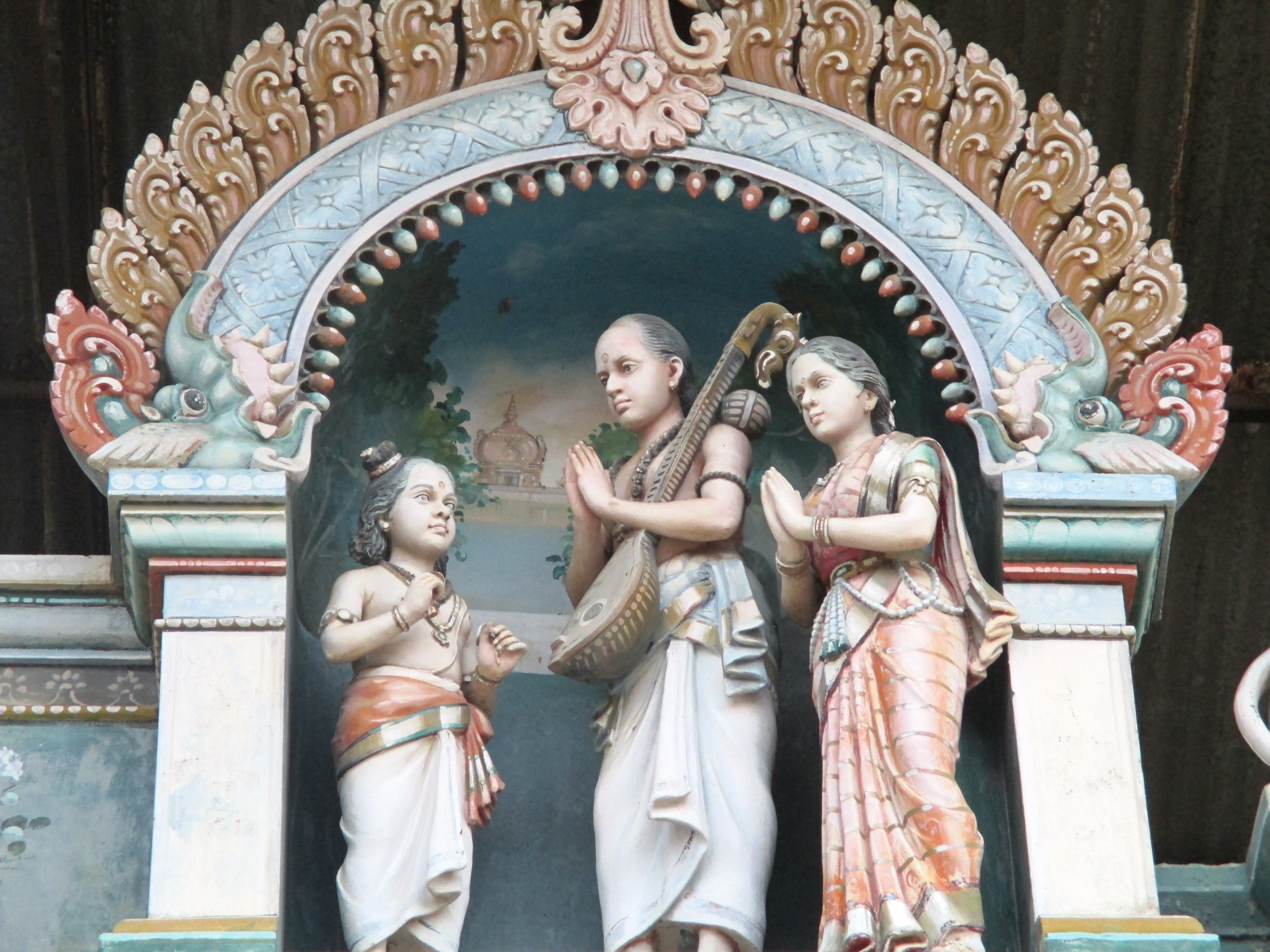
Legend of Sambandar fed by Parvathi and the child becoming a saint

Sambandar was a young Saiva poet-saint of Tamil Nadu who lived around the 7th century CE. He is one of the most prominent of the sixty-three Nayanars, Tamil Saiva bhakti saints who lived between the sixth and the tenth centuries CE. Sambandar's hymns to Shiva were later collected to form the first three volumes of the Tirumurai, the religious canon of Tamil Saiva Siddhanta. He was a contemporary of Appar, another Saiva saint.

Sambandar was born to Sivapada Hrudiyar and his wife Bhagavathiar who lived in Sirkazhi in Tamil Nadu. They were a saivite Brahmins who at that point of time professed Rig veda. The group of servitors wore tuft on top of their head with a tilt towards right, as seen in all murals and statues of sambandar and also finds mention in the related hagiographies of that period and also of the later periods like that of arunagirinathar. According to legend, when Sambandar was three years old his parents took him to the Shiva temple where Shiva and his consort Parvati appeared before the child. The goddess nursed him at her breast. His father saw drops of milk on the child's mouth and asked who had fed him, whereupon the boy pointed to the sky and responded with the song Todudaya Seviyan - the first verse of the Tevaram. At his investiture with the sacred thread, at the age of seven, he is said to have expounded the Vedas with clarity. Sri Sankaracharya who lived in the subsequent century has also referred to sambandar in one hymn of Soundarya Lahari, praising him as a gifted Tamil child (thiravida sisu) who was fed with milk of divine gnosis by goddess Uma.

== Festivals ==
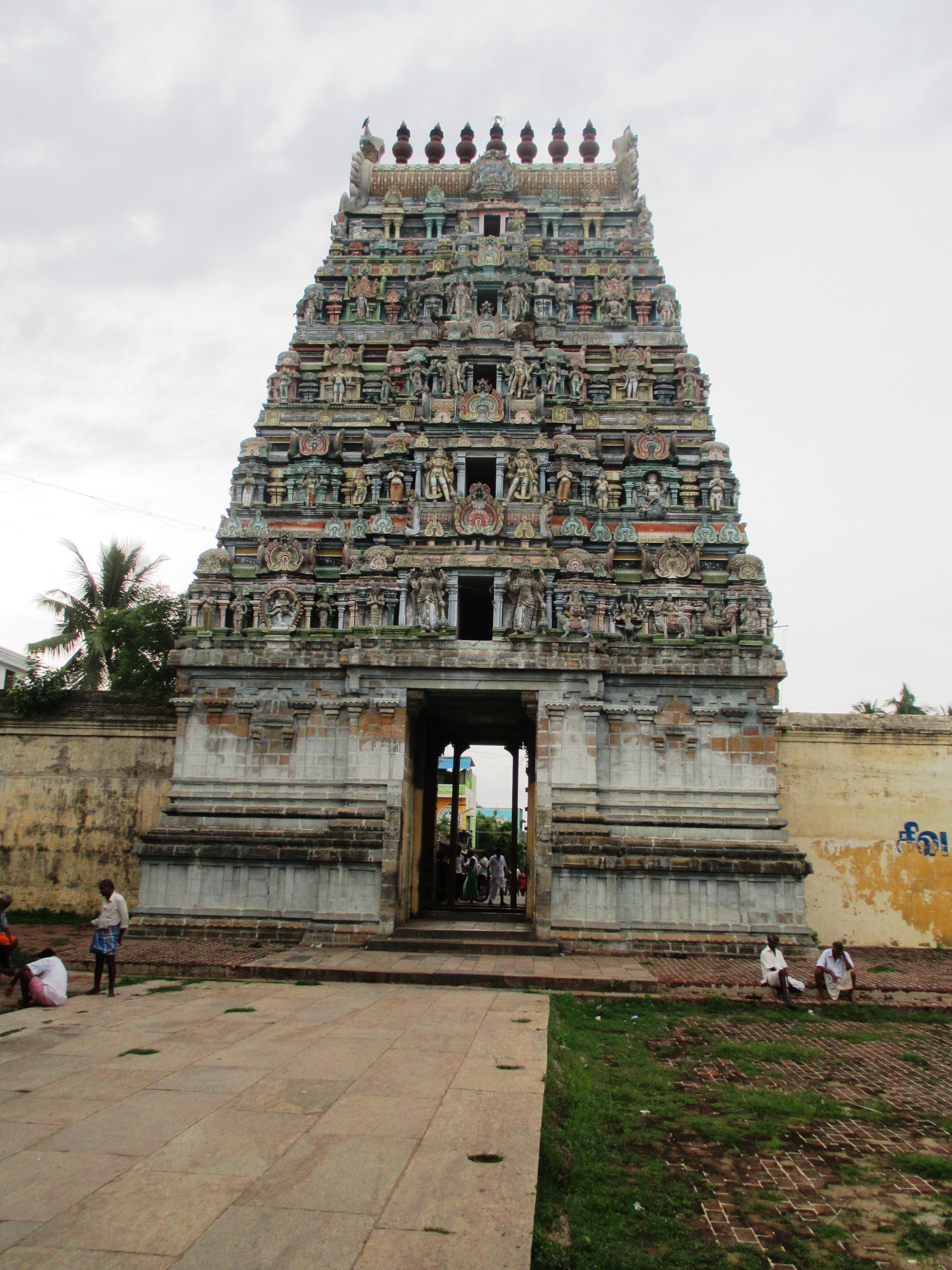
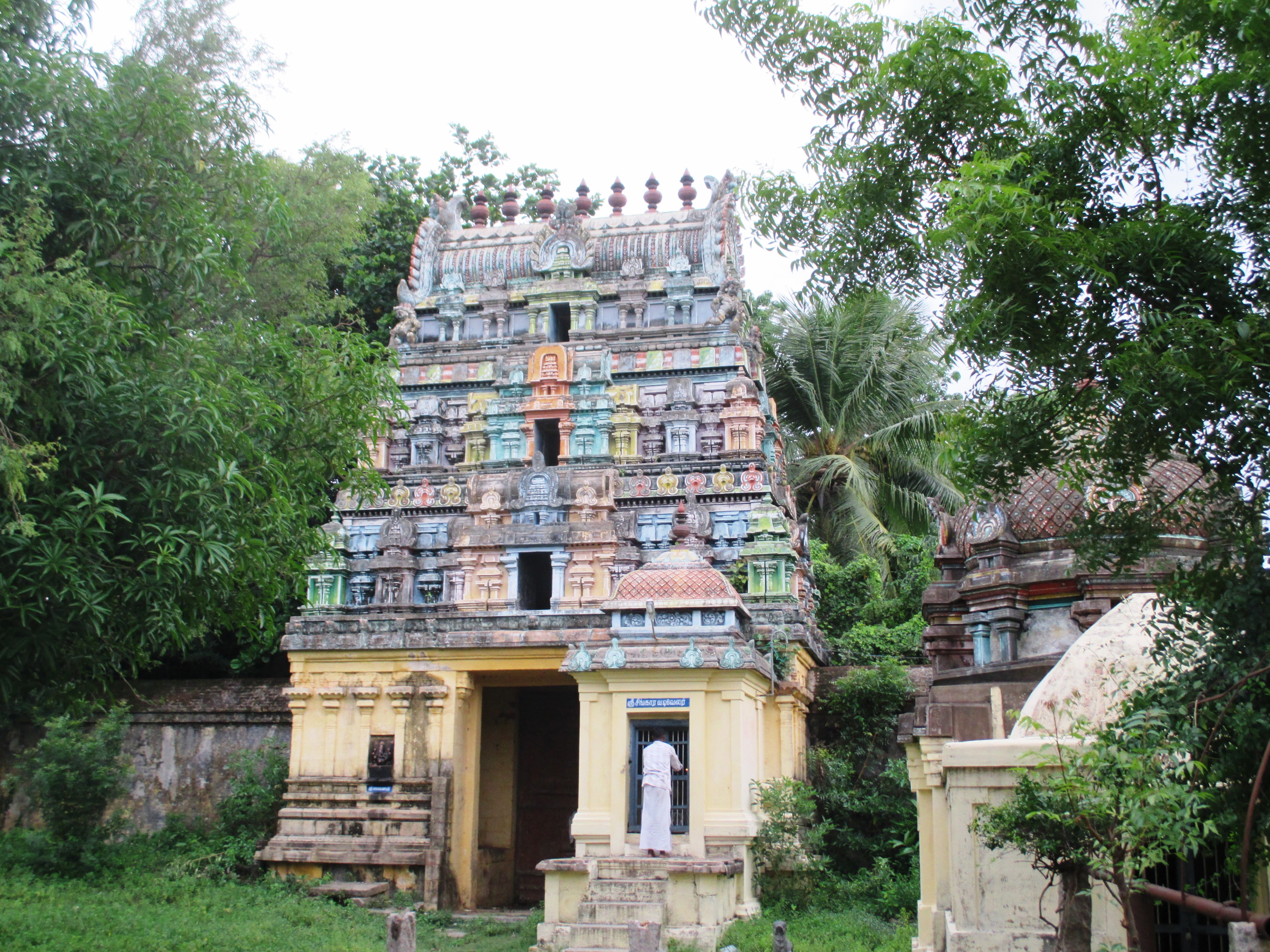
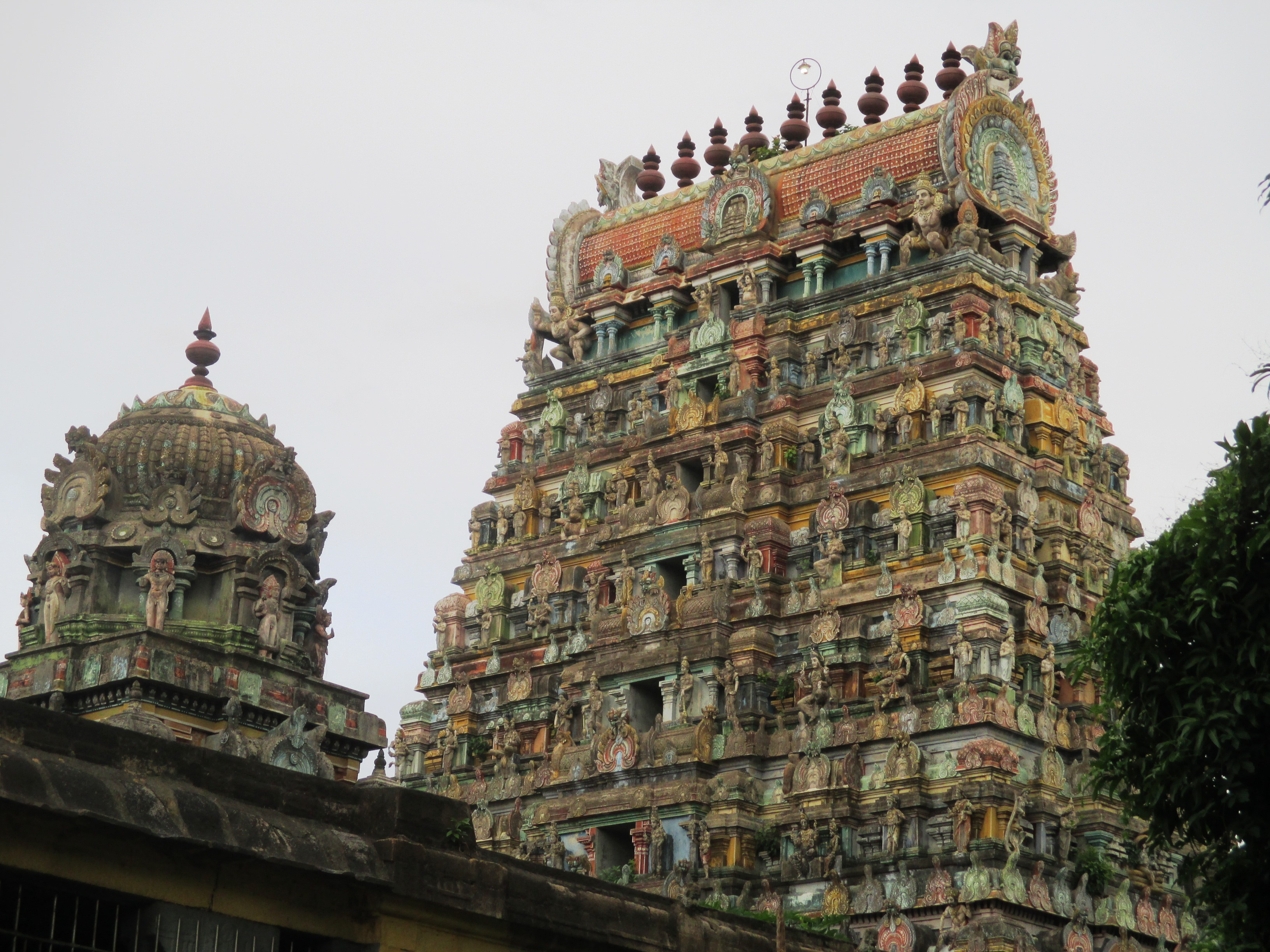
Gopurams of the temple

The temple priests perform the pooja (rituals) during festivals and on a daily basis. Like other Shiva temples of Tamil Nadu, the priests belong to the Shaivaite community, a Brahmin sub-caste. The temple rituals are performed six times a day; Ushathkalam at 5:30 a.m., Kalasanthi at 8:00 a.m., Uchikalam at 10:00 a.m., Sayarakshai at 6:00 p.m., Irandamkalam at 8:00 p.m. and Ardha Jamam at 10:00 p.m. Each ritual comprises four steps: abhisheka (sacred bath), alangaram (decoration), neivethanam (food offering) and deepa aradanai (waving of lamps) for all the three Shiva shrines. The worship is held amidst music with nagaswaram (pipe instrument) and tavil (percussion instrument), religious instructions in the Vedas read by priests and prostration by worshippers in front of the temple mast. There are weekly rituals like somavaram and sukravaram, fortnightly rituals like pradosham and monthly festivals like amavasai (new moon day), kiruthigai, pournami (full moon day) and sathurthi.

== Religious importance ==
The temple is mentioned in the Saiva canonical work, Tevaram, by Thirugnana Sambanthar, Tirunavukkarasar and Sundarar, the foremost Saivite saints of 7th–eighth century CE and is classified as Paadal Petra Sthalam. There is a separate shrine for Sambandar celebrating the miracle of Parvathi suckling the child Sambandar when he was crying for milk. Shiva is worshipped in three different forms; the Shivalingam (Bhrammapureeswarar), Uma Maheswarar (Toniappar) at the middle level, and Bhairavar (Sattanathar) at the upper level. The original temple was enlarged during the period of Kulothunga Chola I, Vikrama Chola, Kulothunga Chola II and Kulothunga Chola III (as in Chidambaram – 11th through the 13th centuries). Every year in the Tamil month of Chithirai (April – May), a 10-day festival is celebrated.

According to a Hindu legend, Mahalingaswamy at Thiruvidaimarudur is the centre of all Shiva temples in the region and the Saptha Vigraha moorthis (seven prime consorts in all Shiva temples) are located at seven cardinal points around the temple, located in various parts of the state. The seven deities are Nataraja in Chidambaram Nataraja Temple at Chidambaram, Chandikeswarar temple at Tirucheingalur, Vinayagar in Vellai Vinayagar Temple at Thiruvalanchuzhi, Muruga in Swamimalai Murugan Temple at Swamimalai, Bhairava in Sattainathar Temple at Sirkali, Navagraha in Sooriyanar Temple at Suryanar Kovil and Dakshinamoorthy in Apatsahayesvarar Temple, Alangudi at Alangudi, Papanasam taluk.

Thoniappar, enshrined in Grivakostha in Thonimalai, is an aspect of Bhairava. The Ashtabhairavas (the eight Bhairava) are housed in the Valampuri mandapa in the temple. The images along with the inscriptions indicate Bhairava worship from the late 16th century. The eight Bhairavas in the group include Asitanga, Visalaksa, Marrtanda, Modakapriya, Svachanda, Vignasantusa, Khechera and Sarcaracara. The images are sported with trident, hand-drum, noose and sword.

Arunagirinathar was a 15th-century Tamil poet born in Tiruvannamalai. He spent his early years as a rioter and seducer of women. After ruining his health, he tried to commit suicide by throwing himself from the northern tower of Annamalaiyar Temple, but was saved by the grace of god Murugan. He became a staunch devotee and composed Tamil hymns glorifying Murugan, the most notable being Thirupugazh. Arunagirinathar visited various Murugan temples and on his way back to Tiruvannamalai, visited the temple and sung praises about Murugan in the temple.

Mayaka Kshetras are the places where Lord Brahma was reduced to ashes by Lord Shiva. Five such places are - Kasi (Varanasi) Mayanam, Kacchi (Kanchipuram) Mayanam; Kazhi (Sirkazhi) Mayanam, Nallur (Thirunallur) Mayanam and Kadavur (Thirukadaiyur) Mayanam.
