= Sathyanatheswarar temple =

Hindu temple in Tamil Nadu, India

Sathyanatheswarar Temple
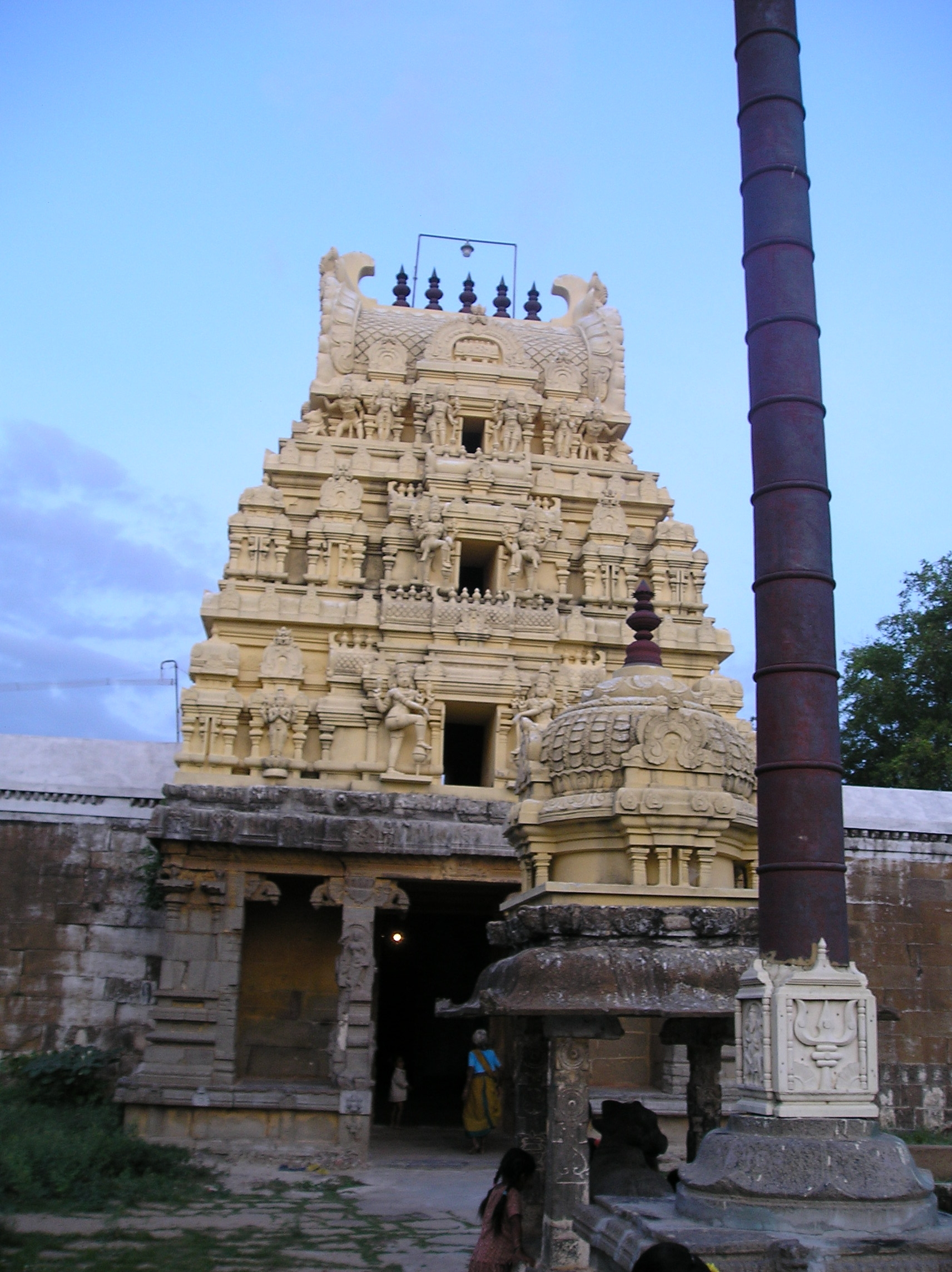
- Image of the Thirukalimedu temple gopuram

- Location in Tamil Nadu

Religion
- Affiliation: Hinduism
- District: Kanchipuram
- Deity: Sathyanatheswara (Shiva) Bhramarambika (Parvathi)

Location
- Location: Kanchipuram
- State: Tamil Nadu
- Country: India
- Coordinates: 12°49′45″N 79°43′01″E

Architecture
- Type: Dravidian architecture

Sathyanatheswarar Temple (also called Karaivananathar Temple or Thirukalimedu temple) is a Hindu temple of Shiva in the town of Thirukalimedu, Kanchipuram district in Tamil Nadu, India. Shiva is worshipped as Sathyanatheswarar and his consort Parvathi as Pramarambikai. Sathyanatheswarar is mentioned in the 7th-century CE Tamil Saiva canonical work, the Tevaram, and is a Paadal Petra Sthalam, the 275 temples in the canon.

The temple has a three-tiered rajagopuram, the entrance tower and all the shrines are enclosed in a granite wall. The temple is maintained and administered by the Hindu Religious and Endowment Board of the Government of Tamil Nadu.

== Etymology and legend ==
According to legend, Indra, the king of celestial deities and Bhudan (Mercury) worshipped Shiva at this place located in a forest called Kaaraivanam. Since it was located in Kaaraivanam, the presiding deity came to be known as Karaivananathar (Sathyanatheswarar). Tirugnana Sambandar, a 7th-century Tamil Saivite poet, venerated Sathyanatheswarar in one verse in Tevaram, compiled as the First Tirumurai. As the temple is revered in Tevaram, it is classified as Paadal Petra Sthalam, one of the 275 temples that find mention in the Saiva canon.

As per Hindu legend, Chandra (moon) was under the tutelage of Guru (Jupiter). He wanted to marry Guru's wife, Dhara and did a yagna seeking the boon from Vishnu. Guru attended the function with Dhara, when she was allured by Chandra. Budha was born to Chandra and Dhara. When Budha became a youngster, he came to know about his birth, felt ashamed and started doing a penance praying to Shiva to include him as one of the Navagrahas at this place. Shiva was pleased by his devotion and appeared as Sathyanatheswarar to offer him the boon. As per another legend, Indra, the king of Devas, the celestial deities, was attracted by the beauty of Ahalya, the wife of sage Gautama. He took the form of a rooster to wake the sage early in the day. The sage started his day by going to the river, leaving Ahalya alone in the house. Indra entered the house to attain Ahalya, but the sage sensed something was wrong in the day. He returned to the hermitage and saw Indra escaping as a cat. He cursed Indra to have eyes throughout his body. Indra was roaming around and started doing penance at this place to regain his appearance.

== Architecture ==
The temple is located in the Thirukalimedu locality in Kanchipuram. The temple covers an area of 22,500 square feet (2,090 square metres). Sathyanatheswarar temple complex has two prakarams (outer courtyard), a lotus tank and a three-tiered rajagopuram (gateway tower) raising to a height of 50 feet (15 metres) facing West. The central shrine faces east and holds the image of Sathyanatheswarar (Shiva) in the form of lingam made of granite and is believed to be a swayambumoorthy (self manifested). As in other temples in Kanchipuram, there is no separate shrine of Parvathi as it is believed that Kamakshi of Kanchipuram is the common Parvathi shrine for all Shiva temples. There is a shrine facing South where the festival image of Pramarambikai is housed. All the rituals performed for the deity is similar to the ones done for the presiding deity. The granite images of Nandi (the bull and vehicle of Shiva), a tall flag staff and a Balipeeta, the place of offering, axial to the sanctum. As in other Shiva temples of Tamil Nadu, the first precinct or the walls around the sanctum of Sathyanatheswarar has images of Dakshinamurthy (Shiva as the Teacher), Durga (warrior-goddess) and Chandikeswarar (a saint and devotee of Shiva). The temple precinct is surrounded by granite walls. Based on the historical significance of the temple, it was in the proposal of Archaeological Survey of India, Chennai Circle, as one of the seven temples to be included as an archaeological monument.

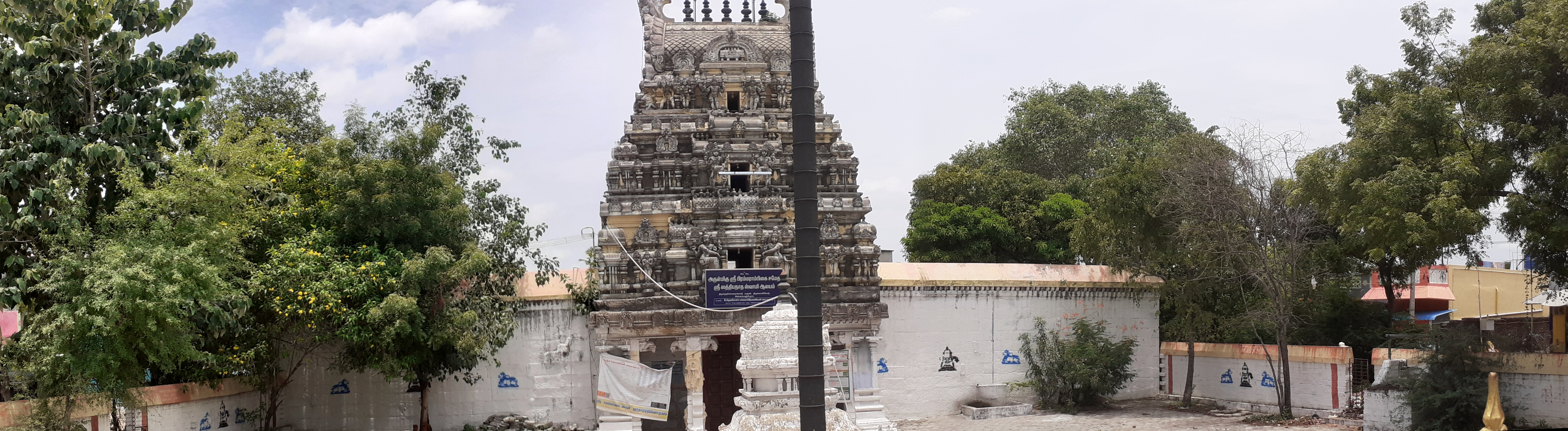
Panoramic view of the temple
