= Alangudi, Papanasam =

Alangudi
- village
- Interactive map of Alangudi
- Coordinates: 10.7993225°N 79.1978758°E
- Country: India
- State: Tamil Nadu
- District: Thanjavur

Population (2001)
  - Total: 1,674

Languages
  - Official: Tamil
- Time zone: UTC+5:30 (IST)

Alangudi is a village in the Papanasam taluk of Thanjavur district, Tamil Nadu, India.

== Demographics ==
As per the 2010 census, Alangudi had a total population of 1674 with 791 males and 883 females. The sex ratio was 1116. The literacy rate was 69.42.
