= Thiruvalanjuli =

Thiruvalanjuli Thiruvalanchuzhi
- Suburban
- Nickname: Thiruvalanchuzhi
- Country: India
- State: Tamil Nadu
- District: Thanjavur
- Taluk: Kumbakonam

Government
  - Type: Panchayati raj (India)
  - Body: Gram panchayat

Population (2001)
  - Total: 10,955

Languages
  - Official: Tamil
- Time zone: UTC+5:30 (IST)

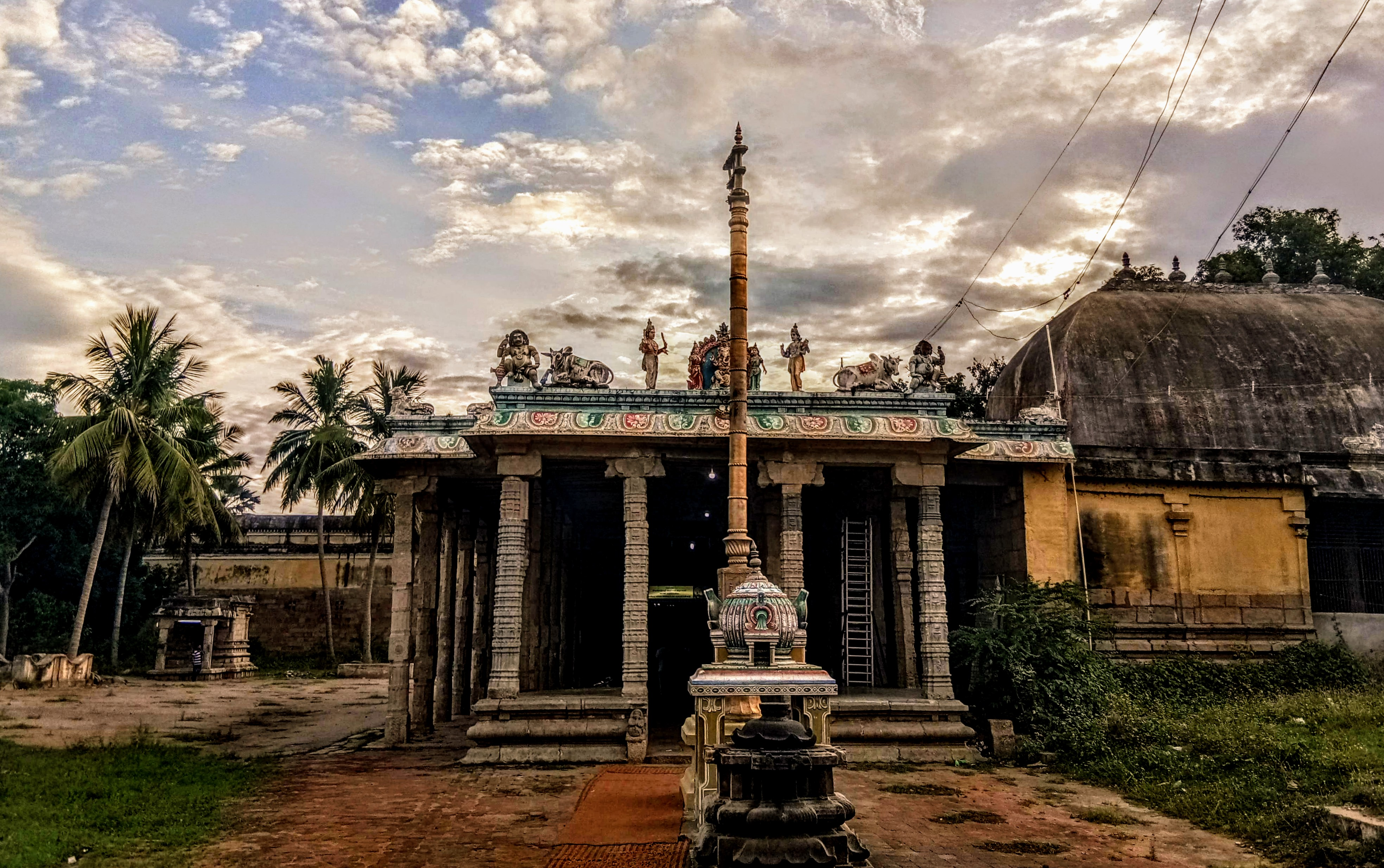
The Swetha-Vinayagar Temple within the Kabartheeswarar Temple. The Ganesha idol in this temple is made out of Parkadal Nurai (Sea Water foam). Visitors can see the idol through a window made of stone.

Thiruvalanjuli is a village in the Kumbakonam taluk of Thanjavur district, Tamil Nadu, India. The village is known for the famous Kabartheeswarar Temple which houses the image of Vellai Vinayagar. It is the suburban region of business city of Kumbakonam.

The last inscription mentioning a medieval Chera king of Kerala is found on south wall of the mandapa in front of the central shrine in Kabartheeswara Temple, Thiruvalanjuli (dated in the regnal year of his overlord Vikrama Chola).

== Demographics ==
In the 2001 census, Thiruvalanjuli had a population of 10,955 with 5441 males and 5514 females. The sex ratio was 1013. The literacy rate was 71.51%.
