= Apatsahayesvarar Temple, Alangudi =

Navagraha temple in Tamil Nadu

Abathsagayeswarar Temple
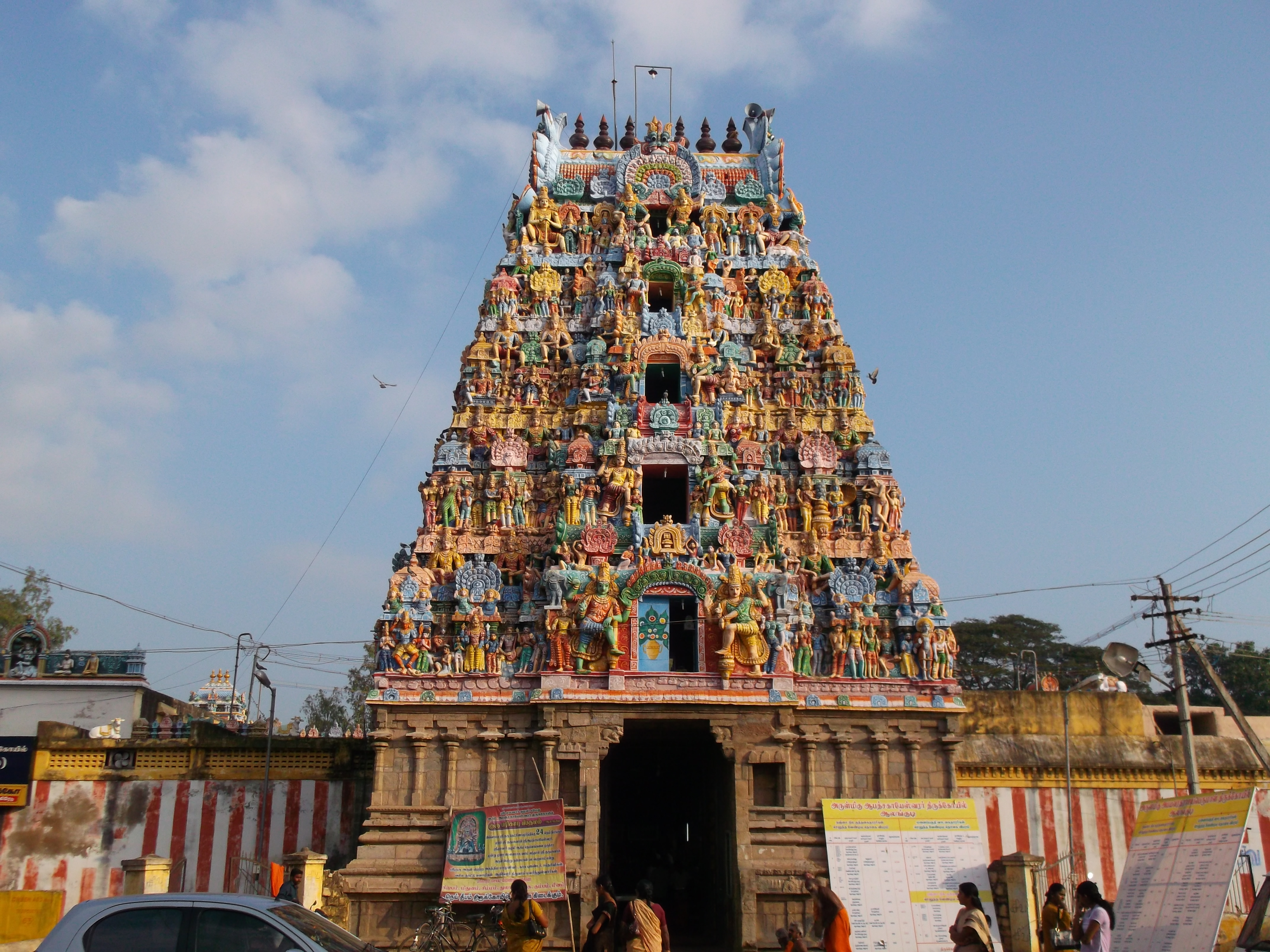

- Location in Tamil Nadu

Religion
- Affiliation: Hinduism
- District: Tiruvarur
- Deity: Abathsagewarar (Shiva), Dakshinamoorthy (Guru or Jupiter)

Location
- Location: Alangudi
- State: Tamil Nadu
- Country: India
- Coordinates: 10°49′48″N 79°24′37″E

Architecture
- Type: Dravidian architecture

Apatsahayesvarar Temple, Alangudi or Guru Sthalam or Tiru Irum Poolai is a Hindu temple dedicated to Shiva located in the village of Alangudi, in the Valangaiman taluk of Tiruvarur district, Tamil Nadu, India. Shiva is worshipped as Apathsahyesvarar, and is represented by the lingam. His consort Parvati is depicted as Elavarkuzhali. The presiding deity is revered in the 7th-century Tamil Saiva canonical work, the Tevaram, written by Tamil saint poets known as the Nayanmars and classified as Paadal Petra Sthalam.

The temple complex covers two acres and it houses a five tier gateway tower known as gopurams, one facing the Apathsaheswarar shrine and other towards North. The temple has a number of shrines, with those of Apathsaheswarar and his consort Elavarkuzhali being the most prominent.

The original complex is believed to have been built by Cholas, while the present masonry structure was built during the Nayak during the 16th century. In modern times, the temple is maintained and administered by the Hindu Religious and Charitable Endowments Department of the Government of Tamil Nadu.

== Architecture ==
The temple has a 5-tier rajagopuram surrounded by two prakarams (closed precincts of a temple). The temple is located in Alangudi, a village located 16 km (9.9 mi) from Kumbakonam and 56 km (35 mi) from Thanjavur on the Thanjavur - Thiruvarur road.

== Legend ==
Legend is that Siva consumed deadly poison, giving rise to the name Alangudi and deity being termed Apatsahayesvarar, indicating saviour during hard times. The other names of the presiding deity are Aranyeswarar. There are sixteen waterbodies associated with the temple.

== Navagraha ==
The temple is one of the nine Navagraha temples of Tamil Nadu and is a part of the popular Navagraha pilgrimage in the state - it houses the image of Guru (Jupiter). The planets are believed to influence the horoscope computed based on time of one's birth and subsequently influence the course of life. Each of the planets are believed to move from a star to another during a predefined period and thus sway over an individual's fortunes. The Navagrahas, as per Hindu customs, are believed to provide both good and bad effects for any individual and the bad effects are mitigated by prayers. As in other Navagraha temples, the common worship practises of the devotees include offering of cloth, grains, flowers and jewels specific to the planet deity. Lighting a set of lamps is also commonly followed in the temple. As per contemporary Saivite belief, the energies distributed cyclically by Navagrahas can be channeled based on remedial measures. As per local legends, Shiva, the overlord of the nine planetary deities, allowed them to freely grant wishes based on devotion of the devotees.

== Religious significance ==
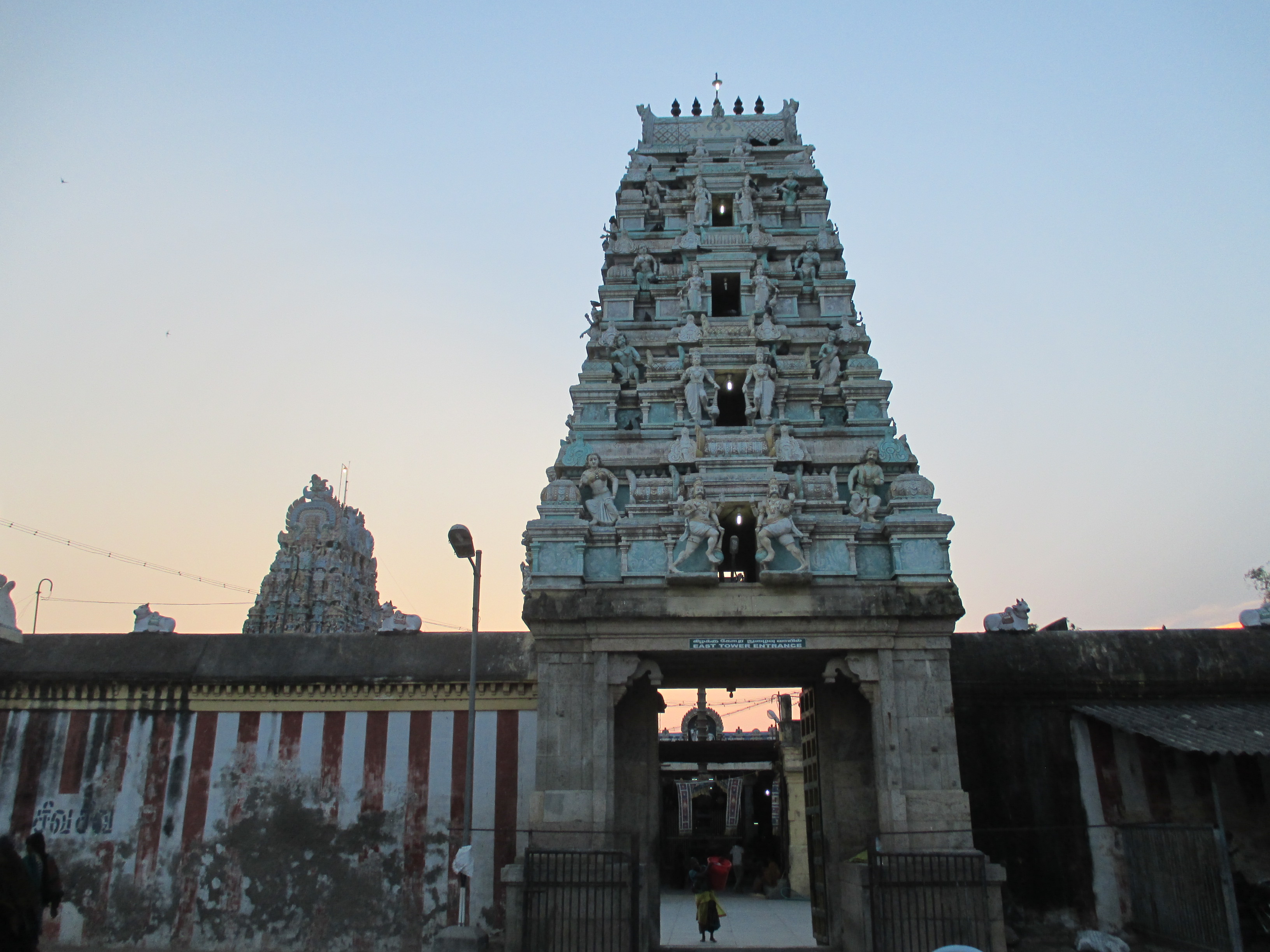
The Northern temple tower

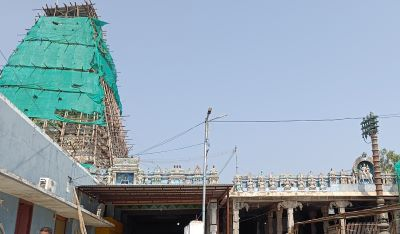
Front mandapa

The temple is counted as one of the Navagraha Temples for planet Guru (Jupiter). Tirugnana Sambandar, a 7th-century Tamil Saivite poet, venerated Apathsaheswarar in ten verses in Tevaram, compiled as the First Tirumurai. Appar, a contemporary of Sambandar, also venerated Annamalaiyar in 10 verses in Tevaram, compiled as the Fifth Tirumurai. As the temple is revered in Tevaram, it is classified as Paadal Petra Sthalam, one of the 275 temples that find mention in the Saiva canon. The temple is one of the most visited temples in the district.

== Sources ==
- Sanjay Singh (2009). Yatra2Yatra. Yatra2Yatra. p. 251.
- Tourist Guide to Tamil Nadu. Sura Books. 2010. pp. 85–86. ISBN 978-81-7478-177-2.
