= Kumarakattalai Subramaniya Swamy Temple =

- குமரக்கட்டளை சுப்பிரமணியர் சுவாமி கோயில்
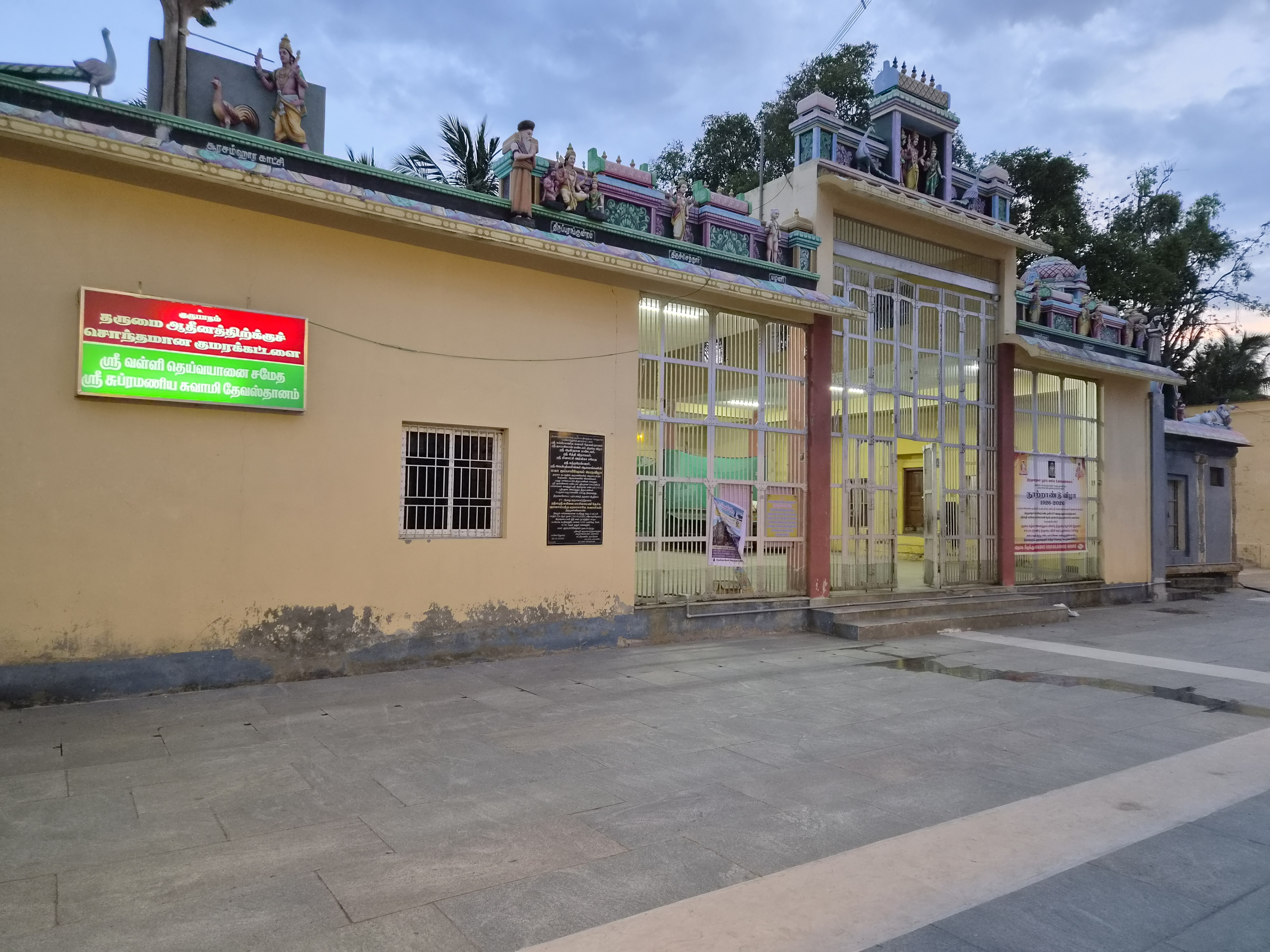
- Kumarakattalai Subramaniya Swamy Temple entrance on the third prakaram of Mayuranathaswami Temple

- Location within Tamil Nadu

Religion
- Affiliation: Hinduism
- District: Mayiladuthurai
- Deity: Subramaniya Swamy Murugan

Location
- Location: Mayuranathaswami Temple, Mayiladuthurai
- State: Tamil Nadu
- Country: India
- Coordinates: 11°5′44″N 79°39′22″E

Architecture
- Architect: Dravidian

Kumarakattai Subramaniya Swamy Temple, also known as Subramaniya Swamy Temple, is a Hindu temple located within the third prakaram of Mayuranathaswami Temple in the town of Mayiladuthurai,Tamil Nadu, India. The temple is dedicated to Subramaniya Swamy, a form of the Hindu deity Murugan.

Although the Subramaniya Swamy temple forms part of the larger Shiva temple complex, the Murugan shrine is administratively distinct. The main Mayuranathaswami Temple is maintained by the Thiruvaduthurai Adheenam, while the Kumarakattalai shrine is maintained separately by the Dharmapuram Adheenam.

== History ==
The Mayuranathaswami Temple, within which the Kumarakattalai shrine is located, is generally dated to before the 7th century CE. The Murugan shrine is associated with the poet-saint Arunagirinathar, who is said to have praised the deity in his Thiruppugazh hymns. The temple is traditionally described as having been rebuilt in stone under the Chola kings after an earlier brick structure, with further additions made during the Vijayanagara period. Stone inscriptions from the Chola and Pandya periods are reported at the site, documenting aspects of its history and patronage. The Murugan shrine subsequently came under the separate administration of the Dharmapuram Aadheenam, while the main temple remained under the Thiruvavaduthurai Aadheenam.

== Etymology ==
The name Kumarakattalai combines Kumara, an epithet of Murugan, with kattalai, a Tamil term associated with an endowed religious establishment or a shrine maintained under a specific endowment (Aadheenam or mutt). The name therefore refers to the shrine's institutional status within the wider temple complex.

== Deity ==
The shrine's presiding deity is Subramaniya Swamy (Murugan), depicted with four arms and one face alongside his consorts Valli and Devasena. Located in the third prakaram, the shrine is notable for its depiction of Murugan receiving the vel directly from Shiva, rather than from Ambika as is customary in the Kanda Sashti tradition. Within the shrine, an image of Nadha Sharma is associated with a west-facing Shiva linga positioned to the left of the sanctum.

== Significance ==
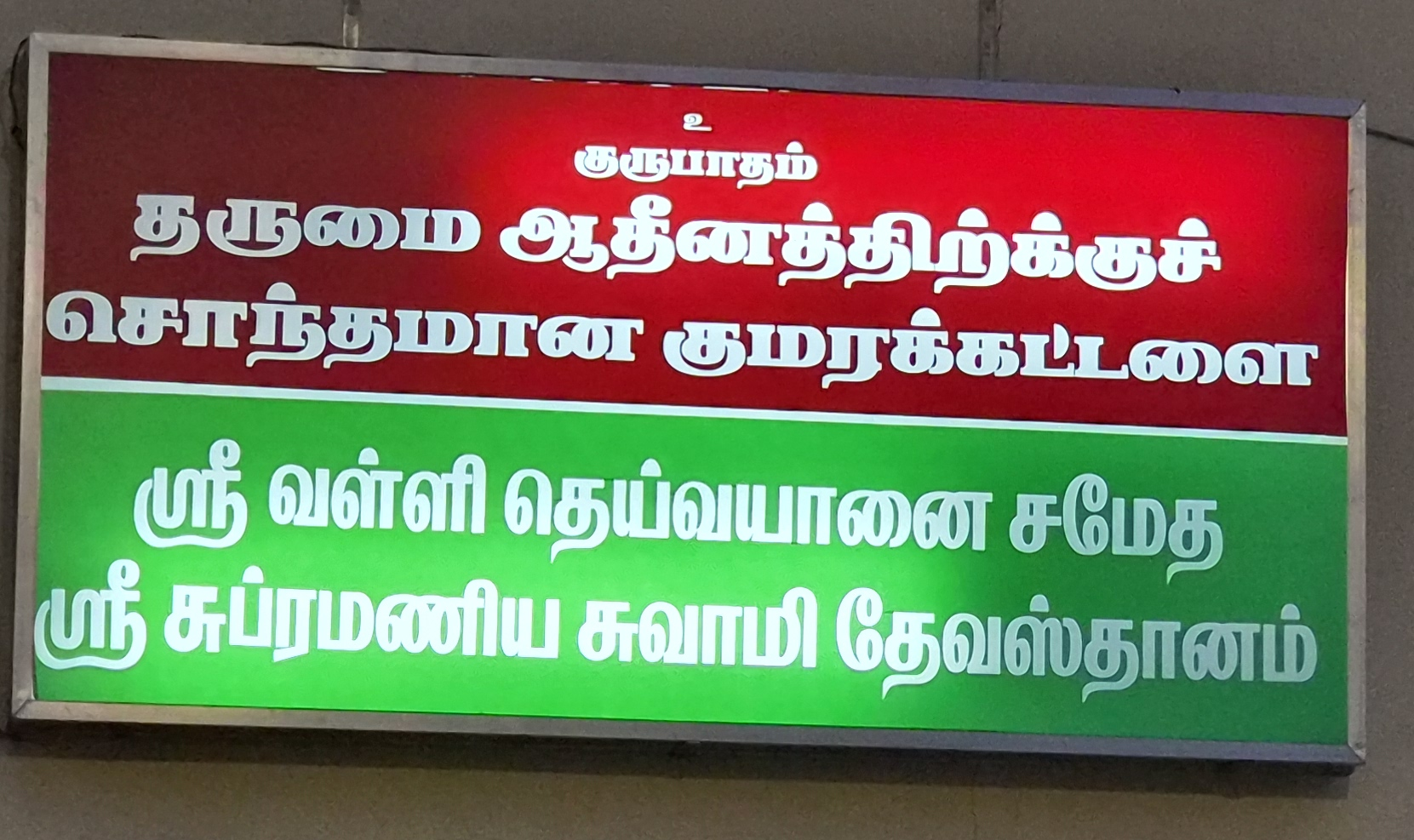
Sign board in Tamil

The Murugan shrine at Kumarakattalai is associated with Arunagirinathar's Thiruppugazh hymns, composed in praise of Murugan. The wider Mayuranathaswami Temple is a Paadal Petra Sthalam, having been praised in the Tevaram hymns of the Shaiva saints Sambandar and Appar (Thirunavukkarasar). Together, these traditions reflect the temple complex's worship of both Shiva and Murugan.

== Bibliography ==
- P. V. Jagadisa Ayyar (1920). South Indian shrines: illustrated. Madras Times Printing and Pub. Co.
- S. R., Balasubrahmanyam (16 Jan 1971). Early Chola Temples (PDF) (1st ed.). ORIENT LONGMAN LIMITED. p. 197.
- S. R., Balasubrahmanyam (23 Apr 1978). Later Chola Temples (PDF) (1st ed.). MUDGALA TRUST. p. 269.
- P.V., JAGADISA AYYAR (1993). South Indian Shrines: Illustrated. revised: Asian Educational Services. p. 271. ISBN 9788120601512.
- K, Seetha (2020). Sri Mayuranathar Temple at Mayiladuthurai - A Historical Study (Thesis). Annamalai Nagar, Chidambaram: Departnment of History Annamalai University.
- B., Venkataraman (1976). Temple Art under the Chola Queens (1 ed.). Faridabad, Hariyana: Thomson Press (India) Limited. p. 37.
