= Mayuranathaswami Temple, Mayiladuthurai =

Mayuranathaswamy temple
- அருள்மிகு மாயூரநாதர் திருக்கோவில்
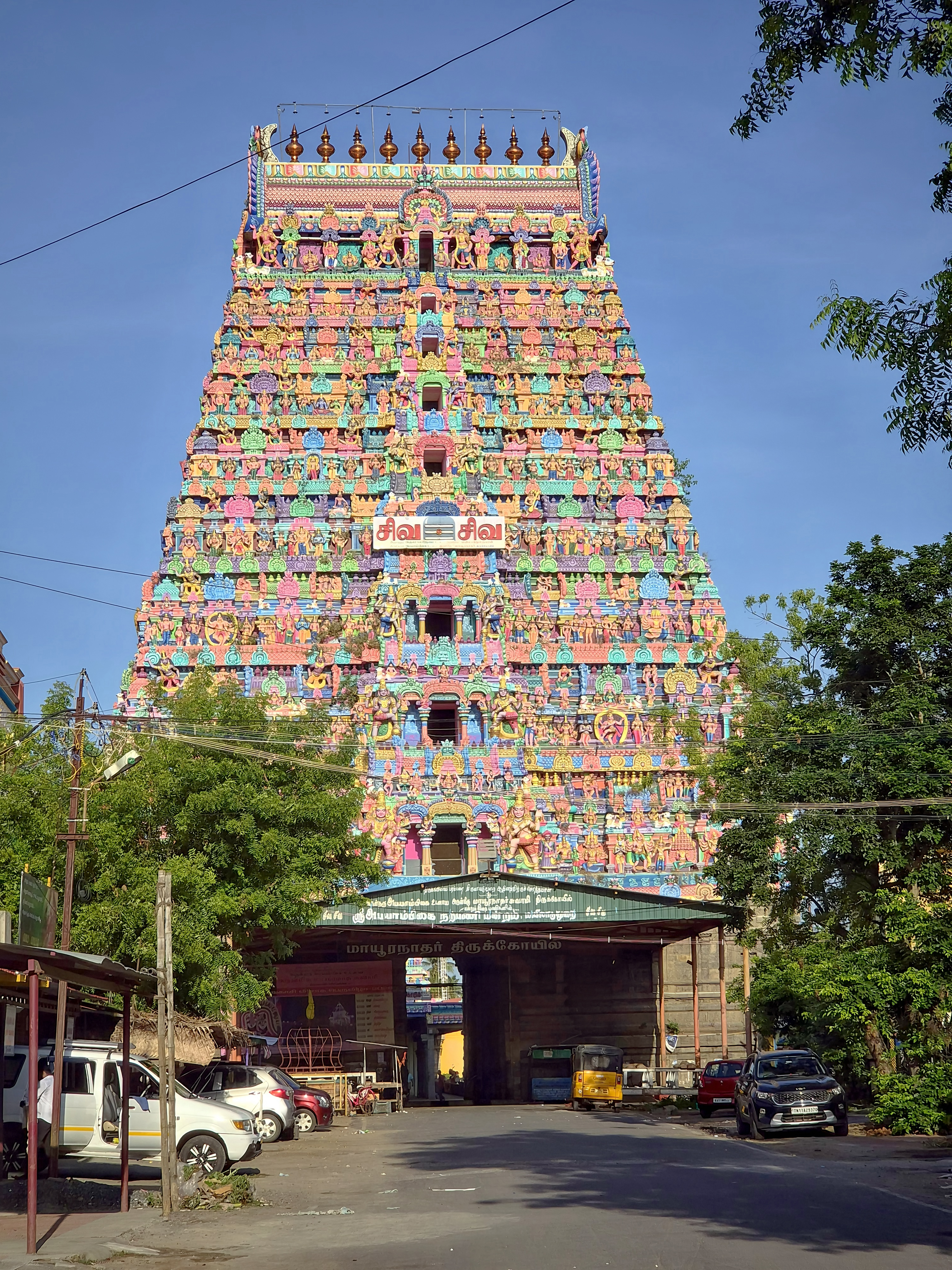
- Gopuram of the Mayuranathaswamy Temple

- Location within Tamil Nadu Location within India

Religion
- Affiliation: Hinduism
- District: Mayiladuthurai
- Deity: Mayuranathaswamy (Shiva); Abhayambika(Parvati)
- Festivals: Theerthavari (Theertham); Margazhi Thiruvathirai (Thiruvathira); (Theppotsavam; Thula Snanam; Mudavan Muzhukku; Mayura Natyanjali (Natyanjali)
- Features: Temple tank: Brahmma Theertham located at eastern side of the temple; Temple tree: Mā (Mango tree, Mangifera indica) Vanni (Prosopis spicigera)

Location
- Location: Mayiladuthurai
- State: Tamil Nadu
- Country: India
- Interactive map of Mayuranathaswamy temple
- Coordinates: 11°5′44″N 79°39′22″E

Architecture
- Type: Dravidian
- Temple: 1
- Inscriptions: 16

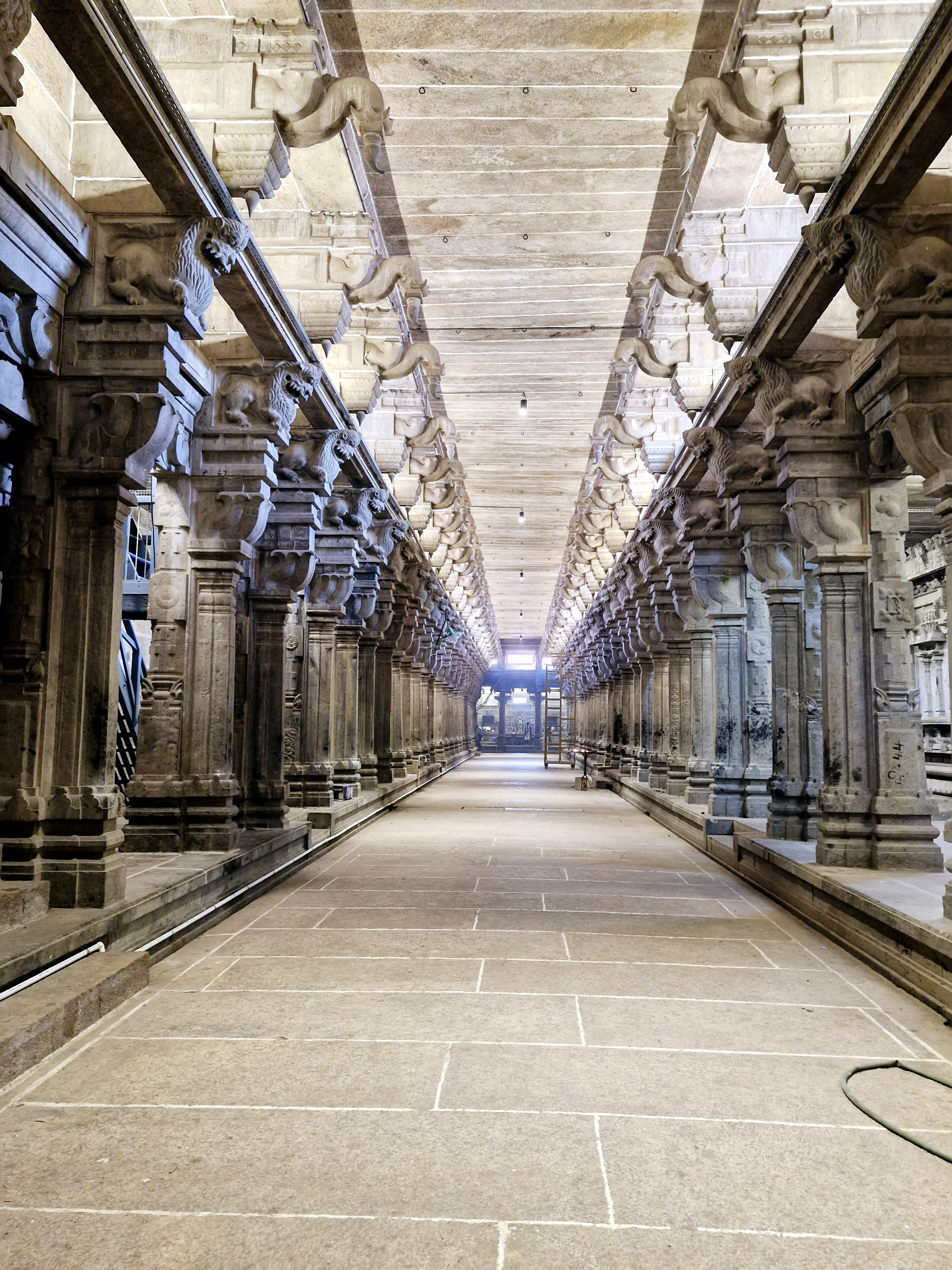
Prakaram (Passage)

Mayuranathaswamy Temple, also known as Mayuranathar Temple or Tirumayiladuthurai, is a Hindu temple in the town of Mayiladuthurai (formerly known as Mayavaram or Mayuram) in Tamil Nadu, India. The temple is dedicated to Lord Mayuranathaswamy, a form of Shiva, and has given its name to the town itself. The main icon is a lingam and the presiding deity is called Mayuranathar because the Hindu goddess Parvathi worshipped Shiva here in the form of a mayura.

The temple is considered one of the 275 Paadal Petra Sthalams – Shiva temples that are revered in the early medieval Tevaram poems by Tamil Saivite Nayanars including Appar, and Tirugnanasambandar. It is the thirty-ninth shrine located on the southern bank of the River Kaveri.

In the 14th century, Tamil poet Arunagirinathar composed song number 788 in the Tiruppukal collection, dedicated to the deity Murugan, associated with this temple. The shrine is managed by Thiruvavaduthurai adheenam.

== Etymology ==
As per the Indian literature Puranas and Thiruvilaiyadal, the goddess Parvathi, the consort of Shiva offended him, as a result, Shiva to curse Parvathi to be born as a peahen (mayura). When Parvati repented for her actions, Shiva reduced the duration of the curse. She then wandered the earth in the form of a peahen, worshipping Shiva in the form of lingam at various sacred sites, including the Kapaleeswarar Temple in Mylapore and the Mayuranathaswami Temple.

It is believed that at this temple, Parvati was finally relieved of the curse and regained her original form as Abhayambika (also known as Abhaiyambal), reuniting with Shiva. Due to this association, the presiding deity came to be known as Mayuranathar.

One of the sculptures in the temple is said to depict Shiva embracing Parvati, symbolizing their reunion.

== Location ==
The Mayuranathaswami temple is located in the heart of Mayiladuthurai town in Mayiladuthurai district, about a kilometer south of the Kaveri River. It is about 256 km (159 mi) southeast of Chennai, the state capital. The temple complex is well connected with a road network, (NH-32 and the state highways). The nearest railway station is Mayiladuthurai railway junction 2 km (1.2 mi) from the temple, and the nearest airport is Tiruchirappalli (IATA: TRZ) 134 km (83 mi) from the temple.

== Significance ==
This Mayuranathaswami shrine is one among the six temples that are considered equivalents to the temple in Kashi, the preaset-day Varanasi. The other five shrines are Thiruvayyaru, Thiruvidaimaruthur, Thiruvenkadu, Chayavanam and Srivanchiyam. Like in Kashi, where the city is centered around Kashi Vishwanath Temple, the temples in these towns along the banks of river Cauvery, namely, Aiyarappar temple in Thiruvaiyaru, Mahalingeswarar temple in Thiruvidaimarudur, Mayuranathaswamy temple in Mayiladuthurai, Chayavaneswarar temple in Sayavanam, Swetharanyeswarar temple in Thiruvenkadu, Srivanchinadhaswamy Koil in Srivanchiyam are the centerpieces of the towns. The temple is counted as one of the temples built on the banks of River Kaveri.

According to local tradition, Indra, Brahmā, Agastya, Umādevī, and the Saptamātṛkās are said to have worshipped Siva at this temple.

== Legend ==
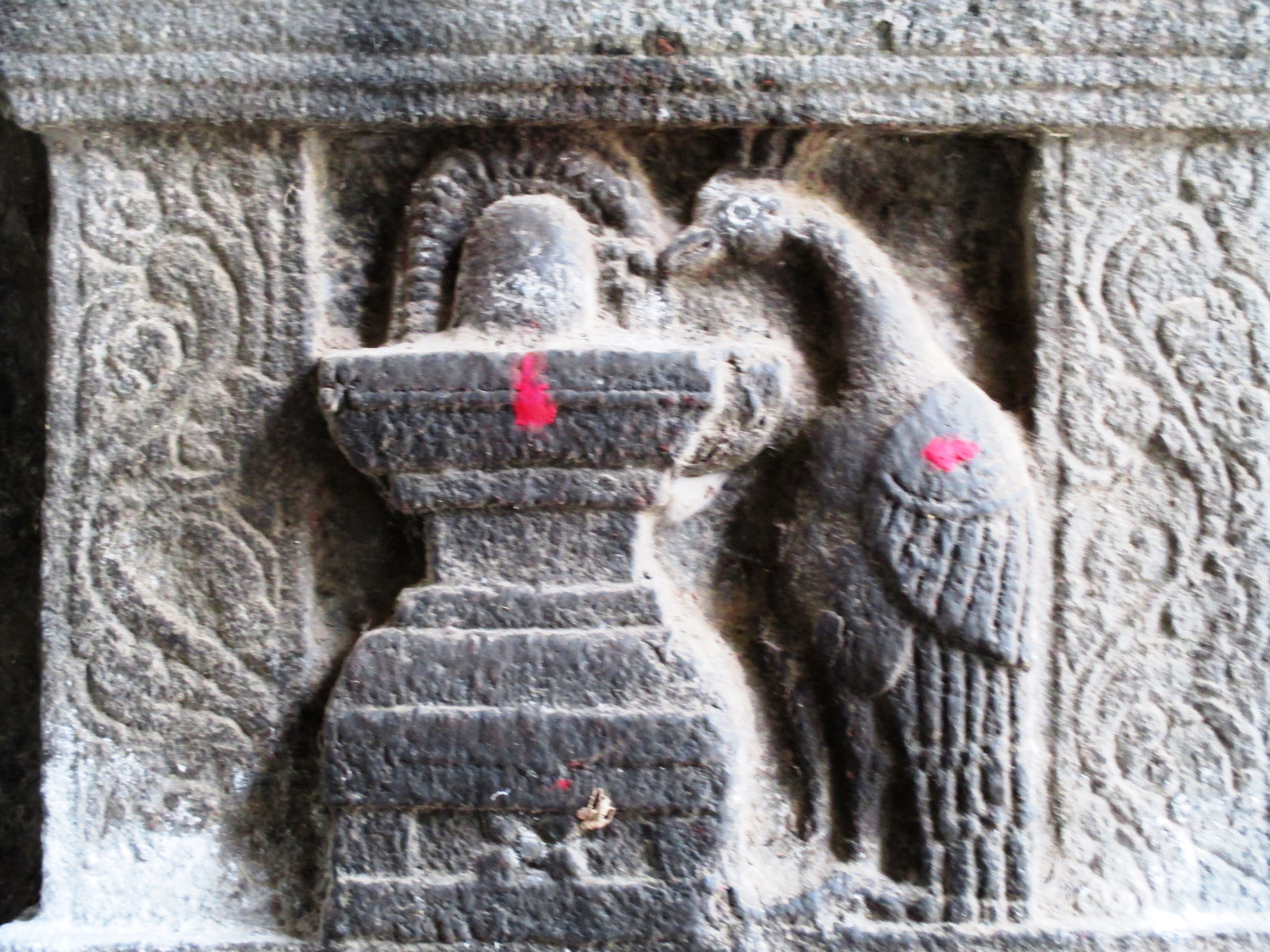
Hindu goddess Parvathi in the form of a peahen worshipping a shivalinga

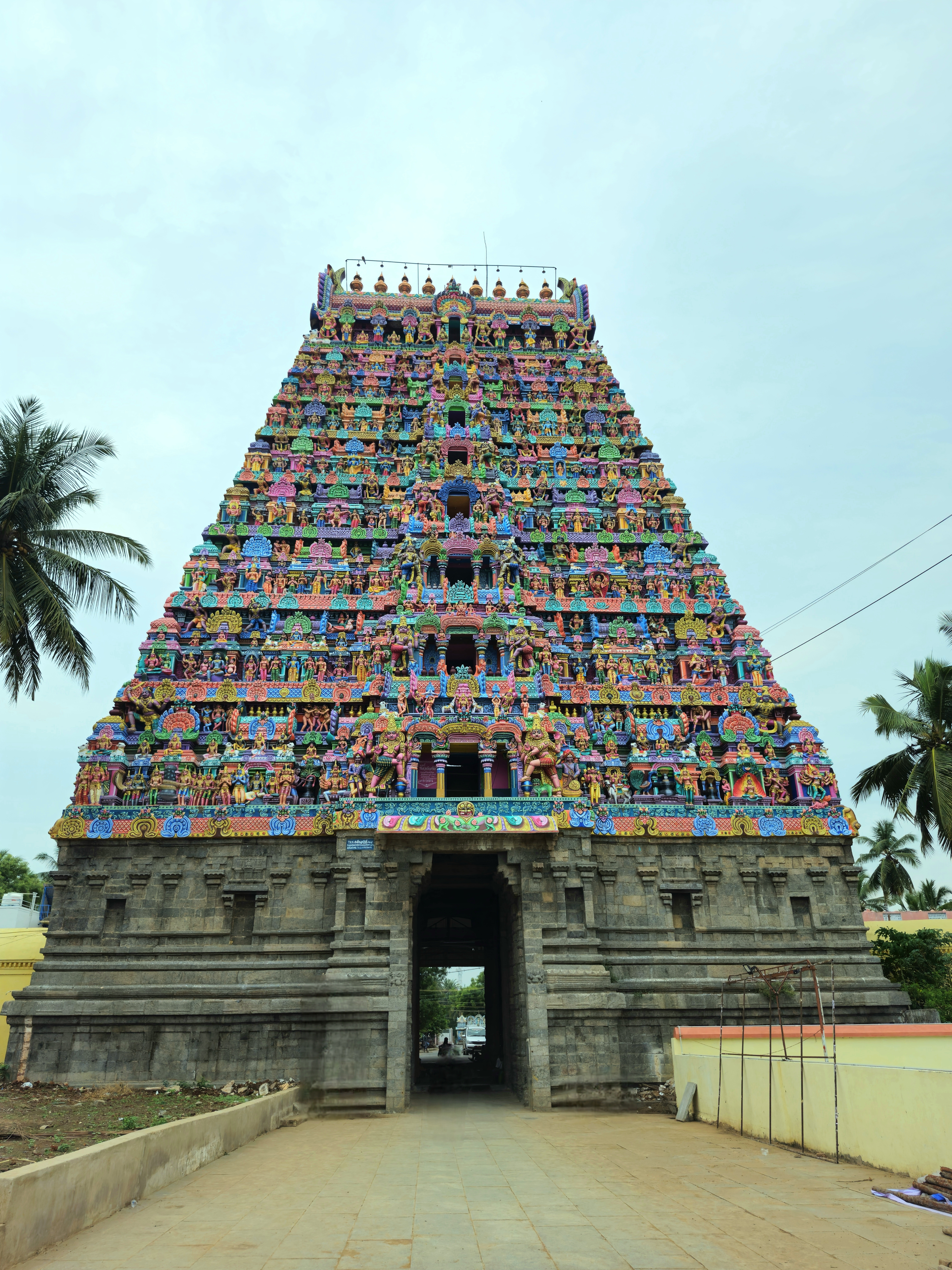
View of the gopuram from inside the temple

According to Hindu mythology, goddess Parvati's (Note: According to various Puranas, Parvati is the reincarnation of Sati, Shiva's first wife. Sati was the first wife of Shiva, the other being Parvati, who was Sati's reincarnation after her death.) father, Daksha, conducted a yajna named Daksha Yajna and intentionally did not invite god Shiva and his consort Parvati. Shiva told Parvati not to go to a ceremony performed by Daksha. However, Parvati attended the function but was humiliated by Daksha. Shiva took the form of Veerabhadra and destroyed the yajna. A peahen used in rituals sought shelter at Parvati's feet. As Parvati ignored Shiva's advice, Shiva cursed Parvati to be born as a peahen. Then, Parvati came to the places Mayilapore and Mayiladuthurai as a peacock and performed severe penance to regain her original form. Pleased with her penance, Shiva appeared before her here in Mayiladuthurai as a peahen himself and danced as a peahen the dance later called as Mayura Thandavam, also known as Gauri Thandavam. After Shiva's penance, Parvati regained her original form as Ambika (also known as Abhayambal or Abhayambika). As Parvati came here as a peahen (Mayura in Sanskrit), Shiva is praised as Mayuranathar. Lord Shiva is believed to have punished the devas who participated in the yajna conducted by Daksha. It is said that they later came to Mayiladuthurai and worshipped Mayuranathar to seek relief from their sins.

=== Purification of the holy rivers at Mayiladuthurai ===
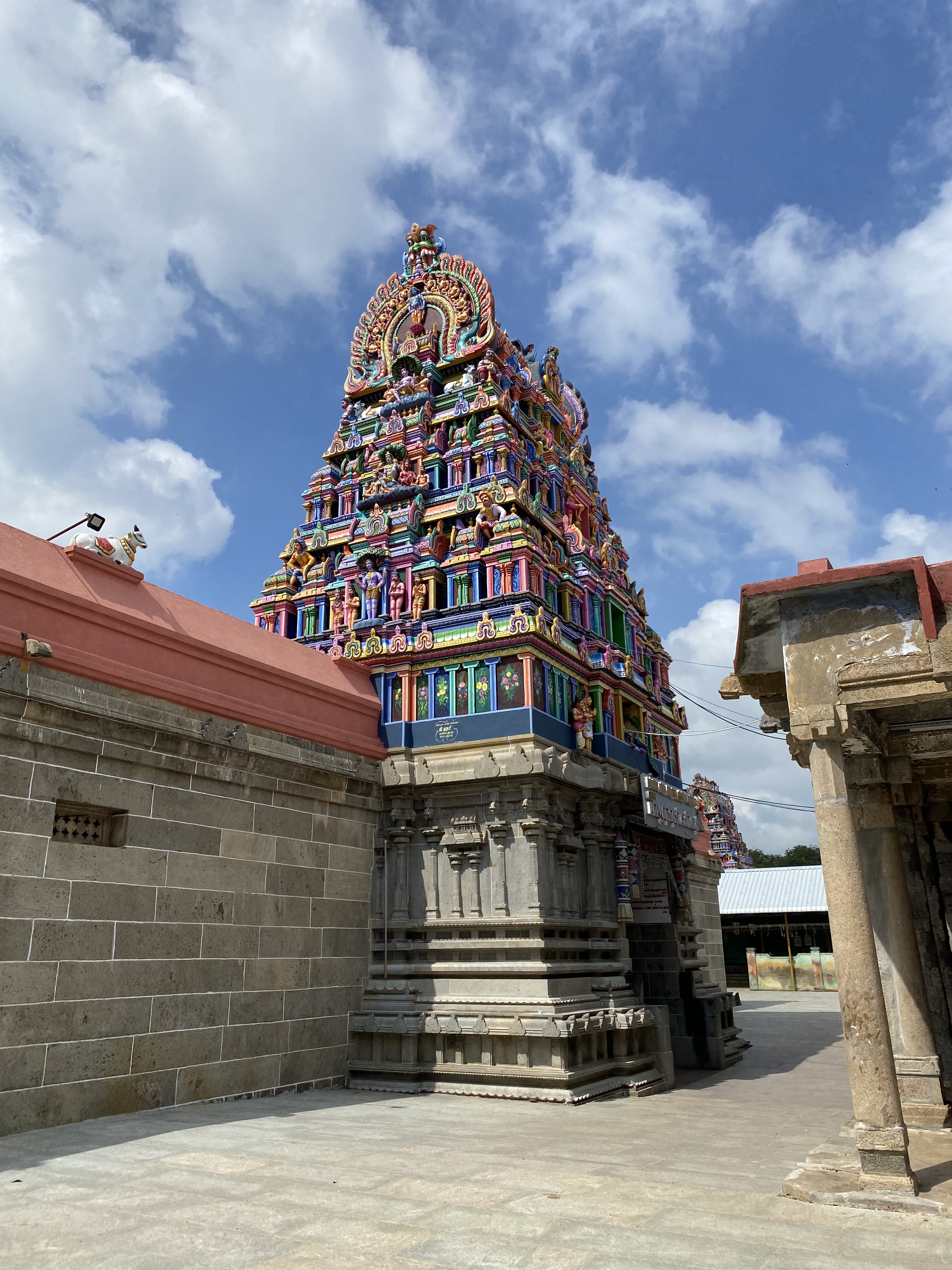
Avayambal Amman shrin

As per the legend, while Parvathi was undertaking penance here, Kanvar Rishi was undertaking penance in Kasi. The holy rivers Ganga, Yamuna, and Saraswathi were burdened by the people who took holy dips in them to wash off their sins. Kanvar Rishi noticed the three rivers were quite dirty from gathering the sins of the people. He advised all three rivers to go to the place where Parvathi was undertaking penance at Mayiladuthurai and to do pooja during the Aippasi (Thula) month to cleanse their sins. The holy rivers Ganga, Yamuna, and Saraswathi came and took dips in Cauvery located in Mayiladuthurai. Lord Shiva in a form of Mayuranathar, pleased with their penance, granted them relief from their sins.

=== Mudavan Muzhukku ===
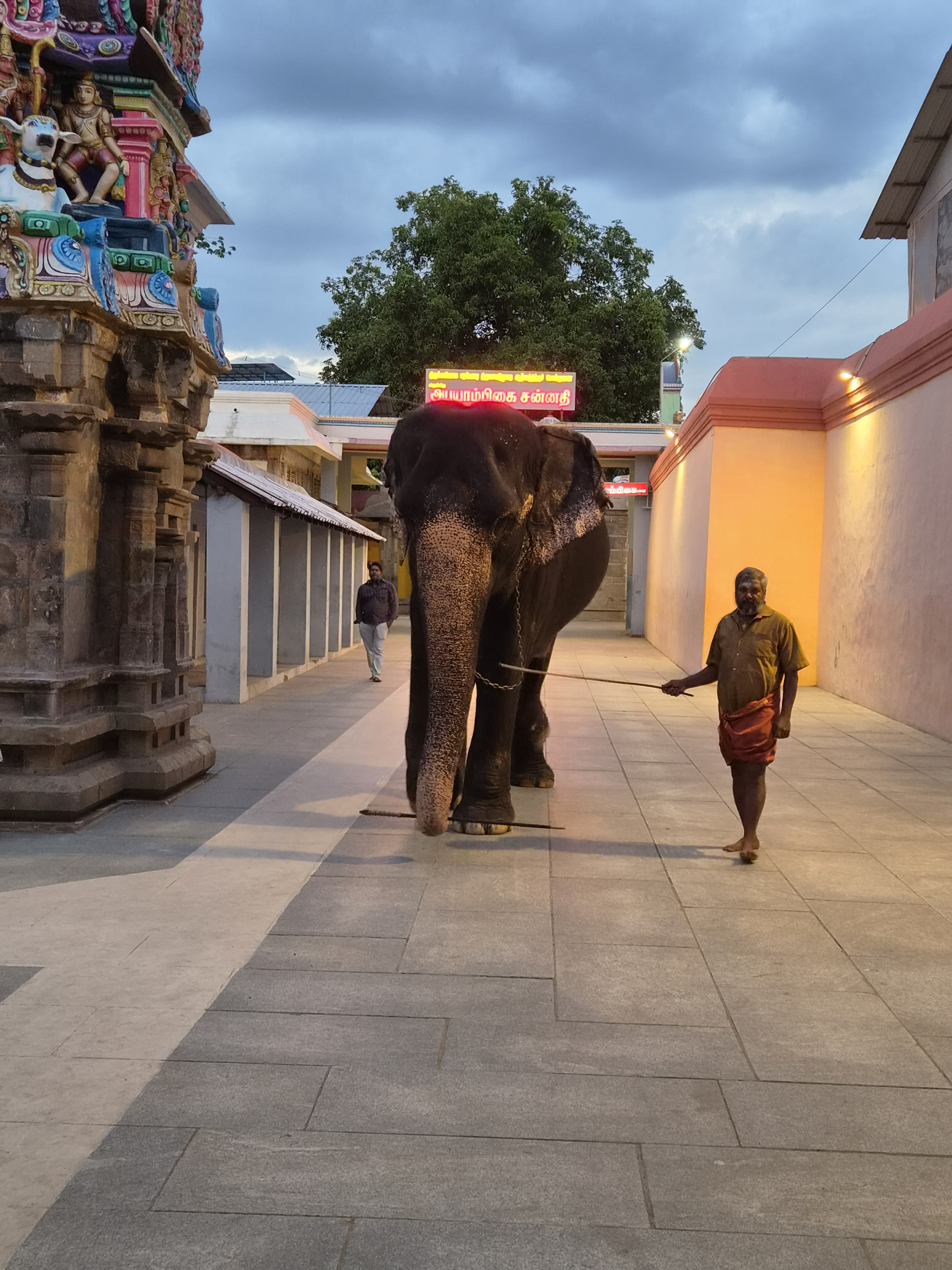
Elephant Abayambigai at Mayuranathaswamy Temple, completing 50 years in 2023.

A physically challenged couple, devotees of Mayuranathar also known as Shiva, from the place Virudachalam named Natha Sarma and Anavidyambikai has participated in the theerthavari utsavam in Thiruvaiyaru. After that, they came to attend the theerthavari festival at this place, Mayuranathar temple. However, they could not reach in time for the Tula Snanam (holy dip in English), as the festival had already concluded. The couple, saddened, prayed to Lord Mayuranathar and slept on the banks of the Cauvery river. It is believed that Mayuranathar, pleased with their devotion, appeared in their dream and instructed them to bathe before sunrise of the next morning, as the new month had not yet begun. The couple performed the Tula Snanam the next morning and attained god's grace. Based on this legend, the first day of the Tamil month of Karthigai is observed as Mudavan Muzhukku (The name "Mudavan" is associated with a legend involving Lord Shiva, who is believed to have altered the usual time for a ritual bath for a physically challenged devotee. The term "Muzhukku" translates to "holy dip" in English.). Stone sculptures resembling the couple in the form of lingams Natha Lingam and Anavidyambigai Lingam are located in the temple, with the Anavidyambikai adorned in a red saree and placed on the left side of the sanctum. Devotees traditionally believe that worshipping these lingams is essential for the fulfillment of prayers to Lord Mayuranathar.

=== Sambandar’s crossing of the Cauvery ===
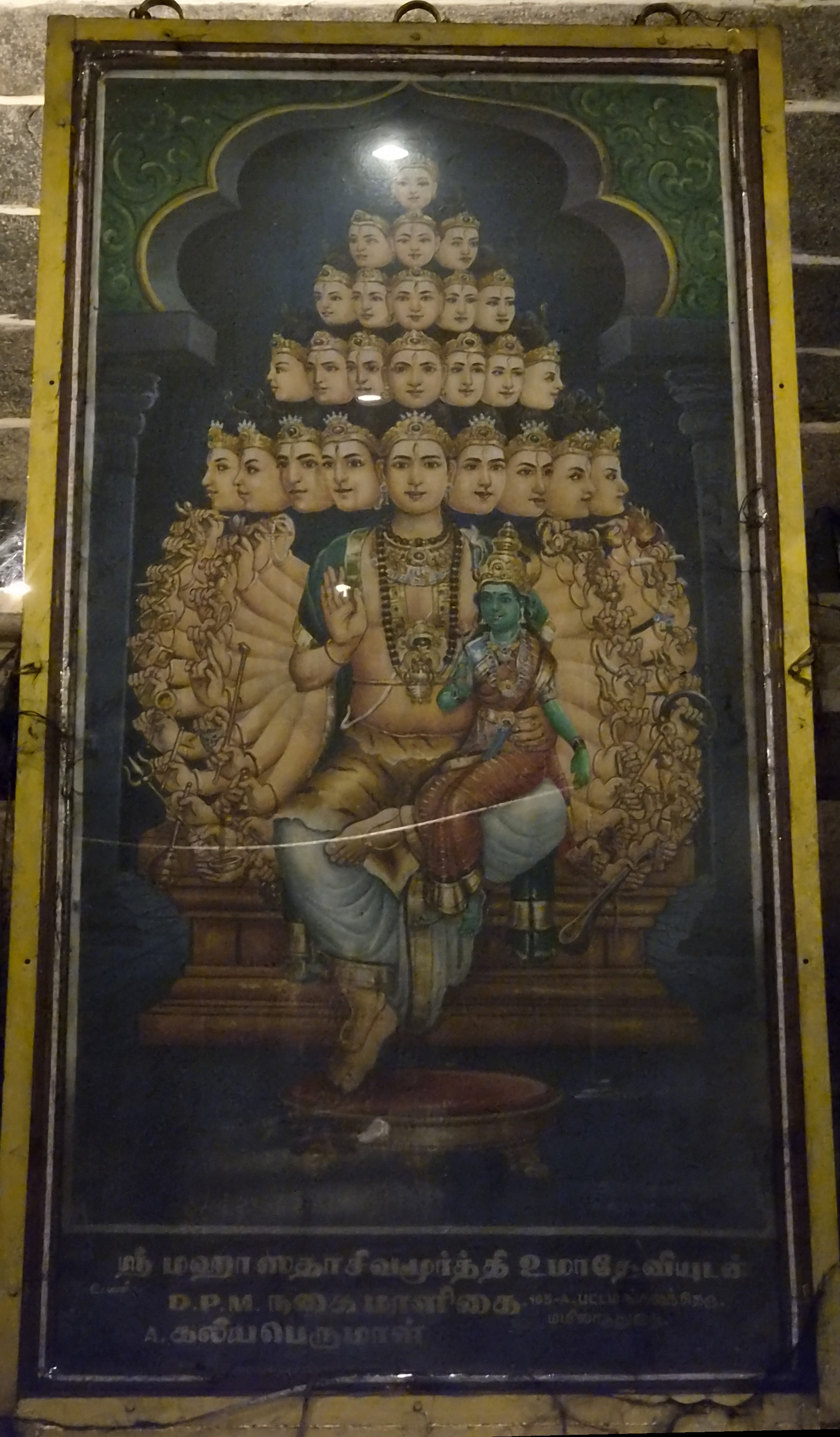
Mahā Sadāśiva Mūrti with Umā Devī, depicting Shiva with 25 faces, 50 arms, and 75 eyes.

Sambandar, also referred to as Thirugnana Sambandar, after visiting the lord Siva temple at Tiruvilanagar Uchiravaneswarar, located at Tiruvila Nagar, Mayiladuthurai district, on the northern banks of Cauvery river intended to worship Mayuranathar. However, the flood in the Cauvery river preventing him to cross the river. Samandar composed hymns in praise of the lord Siva to seek safe passage the flooded river. As per the Hindu puranas, lord Shiva is believed to have halted the floodwaters, enabling Sambandar to cross the river.

=== Other legends ===
Siva as Lord Nataraja has separate shrine here and appears in his Gauri Thandava posture. Lord Murugan, during the Kanda Shasti Kavasam festival, gets his Vel (divine spear) weapon from his mother Ambika, as per puranas, however, in Mayuranather temple he receives from his father Mayuranather, also known as Siva.

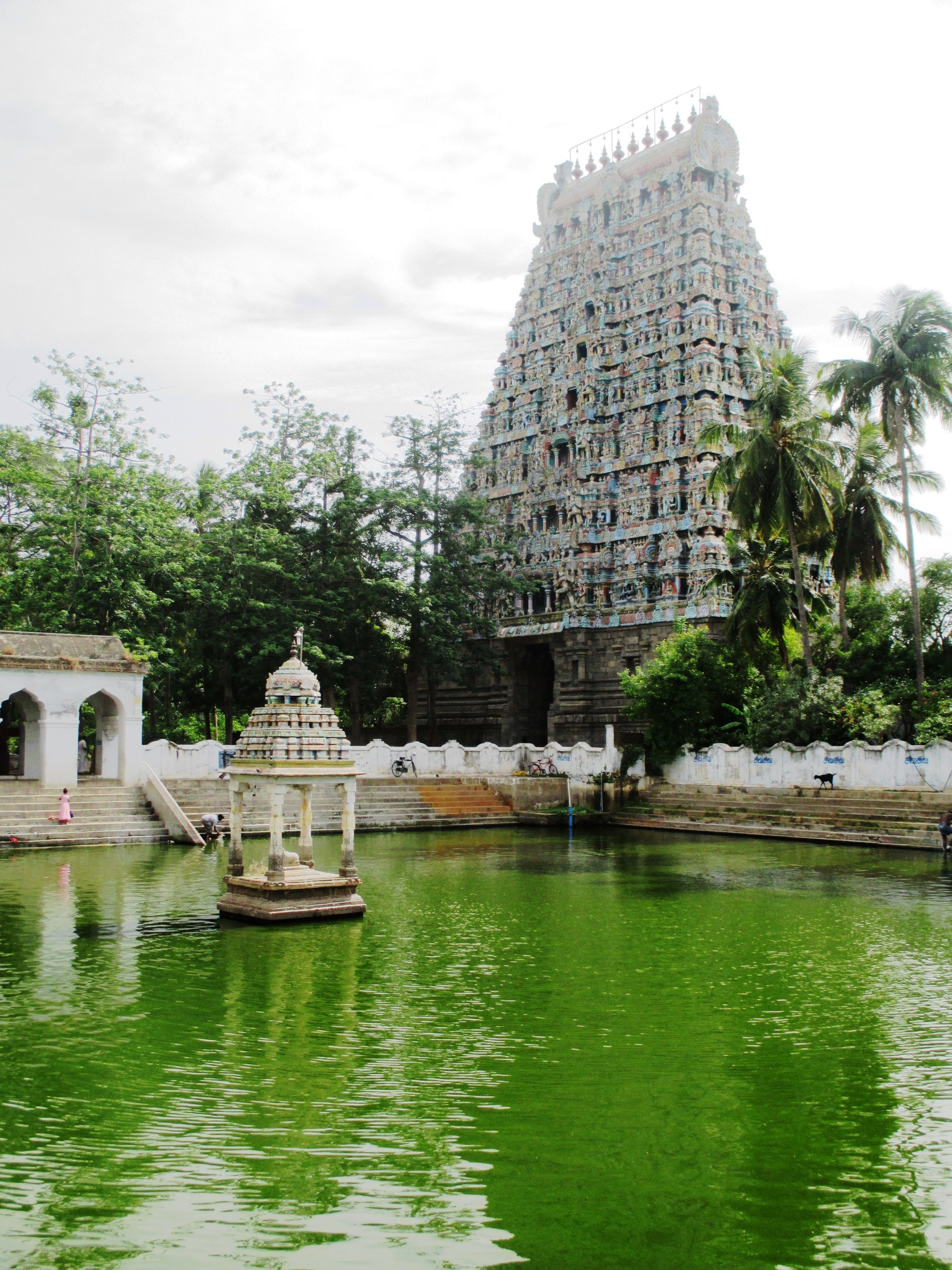
View of the Mayuranathar Temple gopuram and temple tank

There are 16 lingams at this temple. On full moon days, if we take walk around this temple for 16 times, it is equal to the Girivalam of Thiruvanamalai.

According to another legend, the holy dip in this temple's holy tank on the day of the new moon in the Tamil month of Aippasi (November–December) purifies a person from sins, temple tank holy water is equivalent to the river Ganges.

It is believed that Brahma, Lakshmi, sage Agastya, Manmatha, birds and animals worshipped Mayuranathar.

== History ==
The temple is believed to have been constructed in the 7th century CE, as Tamil Shaiva poet-saints Appar and Sambandar composed hymns in this temple to the main deity in the same century, which are included in the Tevaram. (Note: Tevaram (Tamil: தேவாரம், Tēvāram), also spelled Thevaram, denotes the first seven volumes of the twelve-volume collection Tirumurai, a Shaiva narrative of epic and Puranic heroes, as well as a hagiographic account of early Shaiva saints set in devotional poetry. The Tevaram volumes contain the works of the three most prominent Shaiva Tamil saints of the 7th and 8th centuries: Sambandar, Appar, and Sundarar.)

Sambandar, also known as Thirugnana Sambandar, composed hymns in praise of the main deity of the temple, which are included in the Thirumurai. (Note: Tirumurai is a twelve-volume compendium of songs or hymns in praise of Shiva in the Tamil language from the 6th to the 11th century CE by various poets in Tamil Nadu. Nambiyandar Nambi compiled the first seven volumes by Appar, Sambandar, and Sundarar as Tevaram during the 12th century.) His compositions appear in 38th hymn (verses 404 to 414) of the first volume, and verses 748 to 758 of the third volume. Appar, also known as Tirunavukkaracar, also composed hymns found in the Thirumurai, specifically in verses 387 to 397 of the fifth volume.

=== Chola dynasty ===
==== Uttama Chola (971-975 CE) ====
Later in the Medieval Chola period, the original brick temple was renovated with stone by Sembiyan Mahadevi in the 10th century CE during the reign of Uttama Chola. The stone sculpture from the period of Sembiyan Mahadevi such as Ganapati, Nataraja, Siva-Alinginamurti and Dakshinamurti in the south: Lingodbhavar in the west; and Brahma, Ganga-Visarjanamurti, Durga and Bhikshatanar in the north, are attributed to this era and remain in place.

==== Kulottunga I Chola (1070-1120 CE) ====
The oldest damaged and incomplete inscriptions made on the stone date to the 14th year of Kulothunga Chola I, found on the floor in front the central shrine of Mayuranathar Temple. The inscriptions mention a gift of land to the temple with donation of 300 kalam of paddy annually with exemption from taxes.

==== Kulottunga III Chola (1178-1218 CE) ====
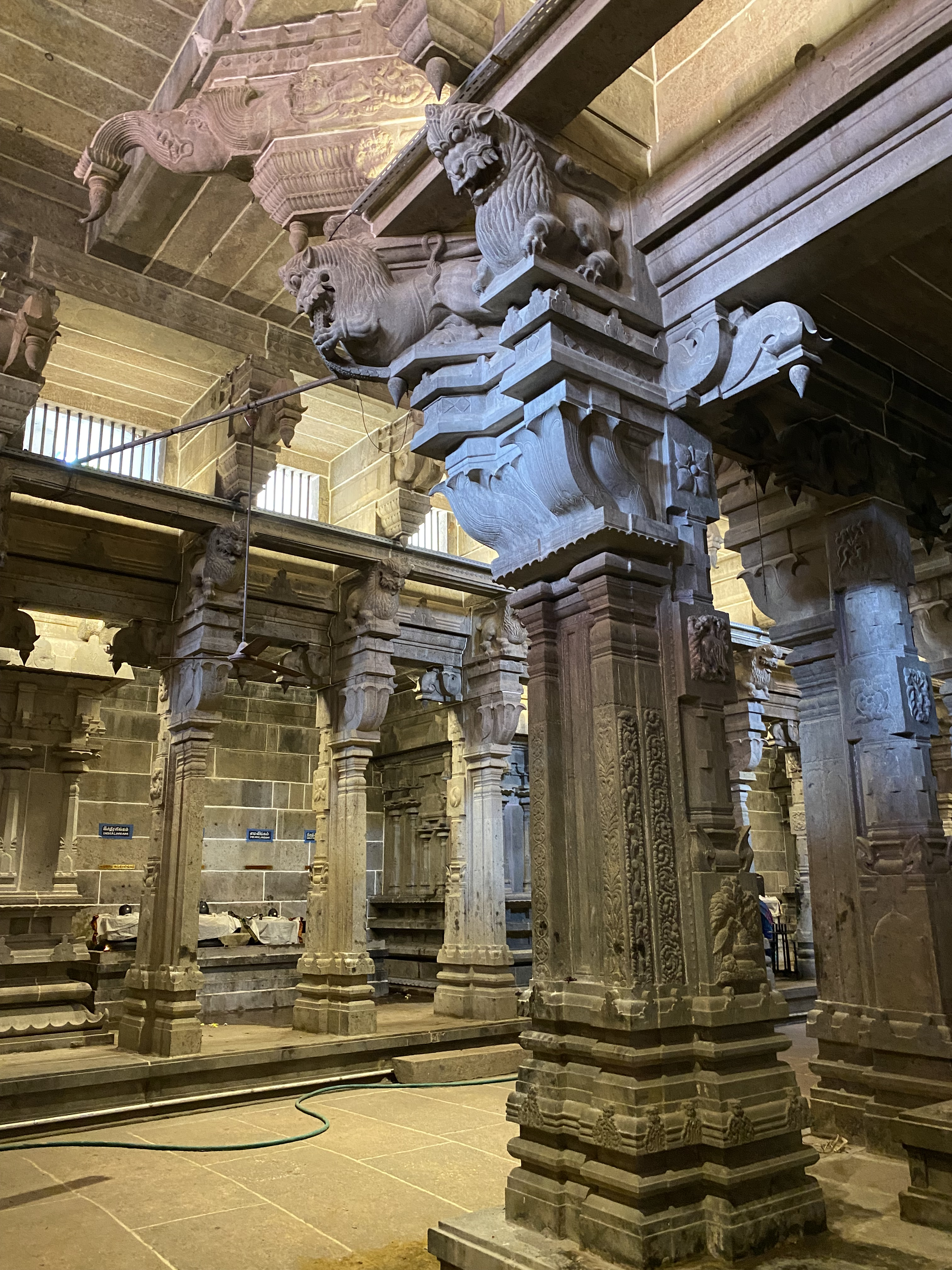
Pillers at prakaram

The temple has witnessed more inscriptions from the period of Kulottunga III Chola, found on the south wall of the mahamandapa in front of the Panchanadesvara shrine. The first inscription in his 19th regnal year mentions a gift of land at Kulottungasolanallur, made tax-free to the temple. Nine other inscriptions note the gifts of land and money by the king to the temple.

==== Rajaraja III Chola (1216-1256 CE) ====
A dedicated shrine for Avayambal Amman was constructed within the temple premises during the 14th regnal year (1229 CE) of Rajaraja III, featuring bronze idols.

An inscription, in the 14th regnal year (1229 CE) of Rajaraja III, a 500 kuli of land for rice offerings for the temple during the early morning ritual services. This inscription found on the northern side of shrine.

The second inscription, in the 31st regnal year (1245-46 CE) found on the southern wall of first prakara, registers a deposit of 2000 kasu (money)to the temple Tirumayiladuturai-Udaiyar located in Tiruvelundur Nadu.

=== Pandyas dynasty ===
After the decline of the Chola dynasty, the second empire of the Pandyas came to power in the Chola region of present Tamil Nadu. Maravarman Sundara Pandya I (1216-1244 CE) captured some parts of Chola territory and defeated Rajarajachola III (1216-1256 CE).

In the year 1920 CE, the warrior king of the Pandya dynasty, Sundara Pandya (1250-1284 CE), brought the entire Chola territory

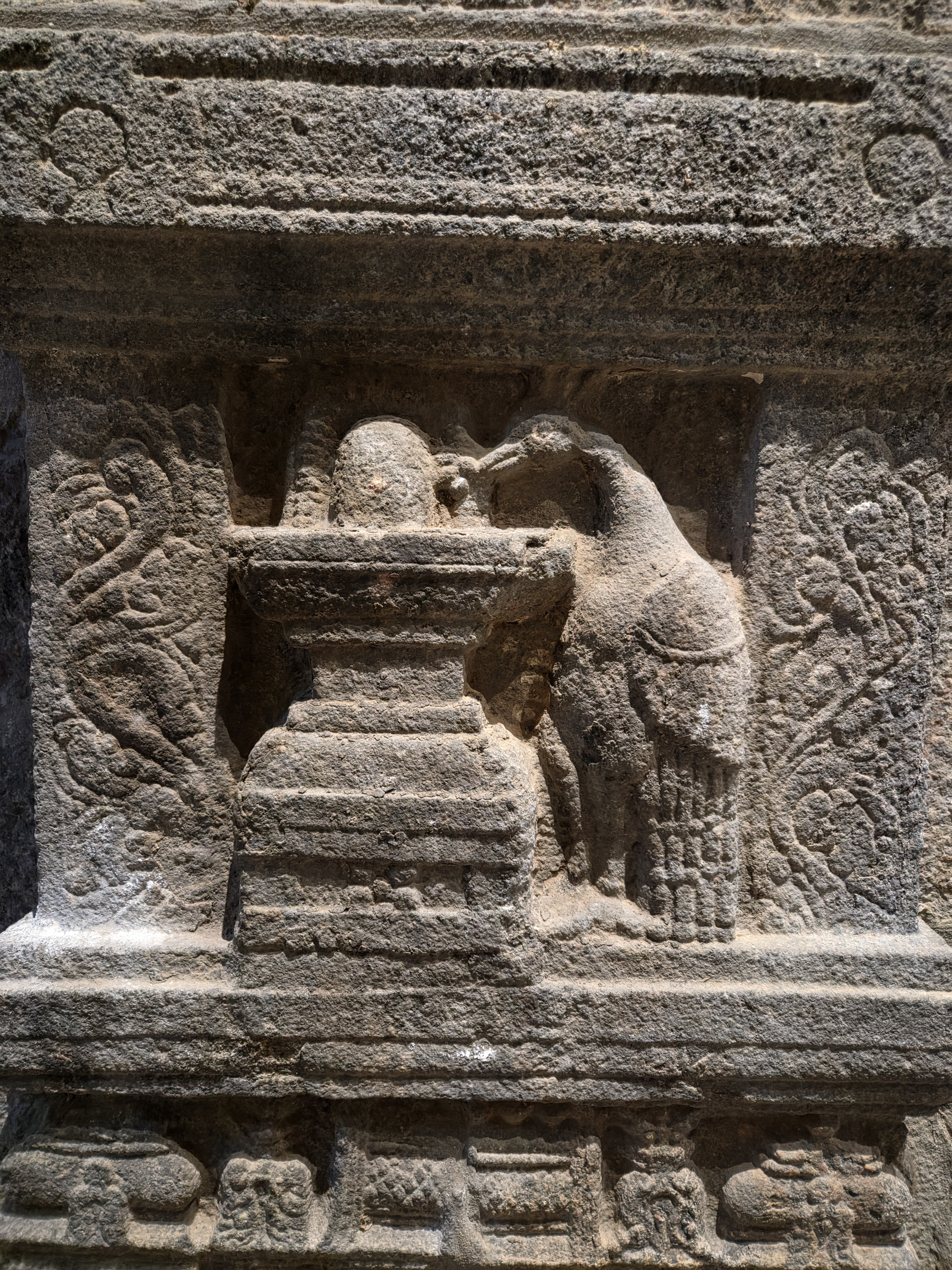
Hindu goddess Parvathi in the form of a peahen worshipping a shivalinga Year 2026

under his control after defeating the Chola king Rajendrachola III (1246-1279 CE). Following this victory, the old undivided districts of Tiruchirappalli, Thanjavur, Nagapattinam, Cuddalore, Kongu, and parts of Kerala came under his kingdom.

==== Maravarman Sundara Pandya I (1216-1244 CE) ====
In the era of Maravarman Sundara Pandya I, also known as Konerimeikondan, the first inscription was found on the south wall of the mahamandapa in front of the Panchanadesvara shrine, issued in his 30th and 31st regnal years. It mentions tax-free lands in the village of Nallattukkudi, a suburb of Mayiladuthurai, that were merged with the temple.

The second inscription was also found at the same location as the first inscription, in his 31st regnal year. It mentions the gifting of land and 60 kalams of paddy and 200 kalams of paddy per year, which had been presented by the king.

==== Other Pandya inscriptions ====
The inscriptions belonging to the Pandya kings Jatavarman Sundara Pandya (1277-1294 CE), Maravarman Vikrama Pandya (1281-1289 CE), Jatavarman Sundara Pandya (Sundara Pandya IV, 1304-1319 CE), Srivallabhadeva (1308- 1344 CE), Perumal Kulasekharadeva (1314-1362 CE), and Perumal Vira Pandya (1334-1374 CE) have been found in this temple and other parts of Mayiladuthurai, including Muvalur, Thirukolambiyur, Thirumananjeri, Kilaiyur, Vazhuvur, Komal, and Kadalangudi.

Just like the Chola, the Pandyas were liberal supporters of this Mayuranathar temple, along with other Shiva and Vishnu temples in the Chola region.

=== Invasions ===
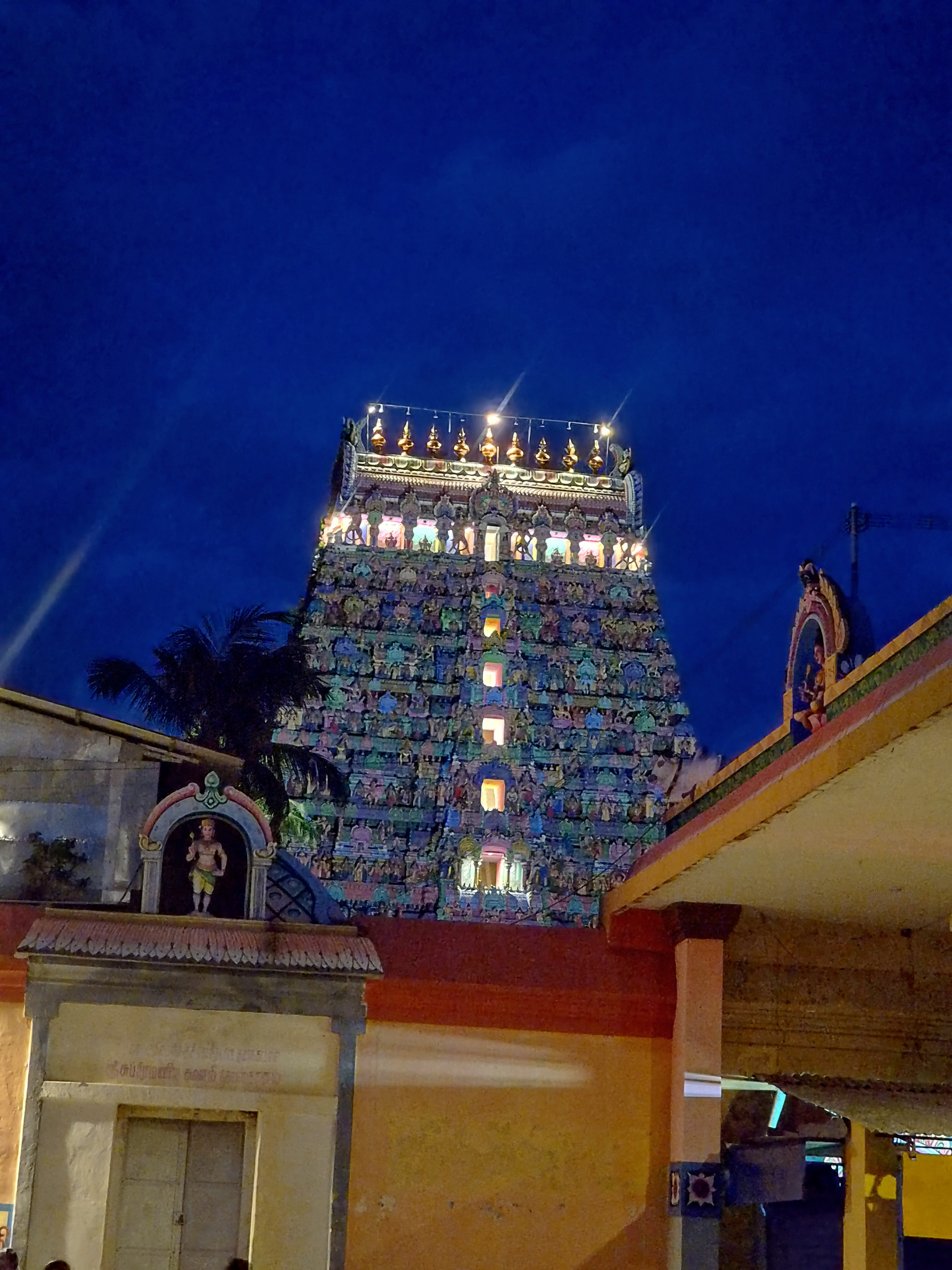
Illuminated gopuram at night

The north side of the Indian Subcontinent had been conquered by the Delhi Sultanate. In 1311, Sultan Alauddin Khilji ordered his general, Malik Kafur, and his forces to invade the southern Hindu kingdoms. As per the instructions, Malik Kafur raided temples and towns in South India, bringing back gold and jewels as booty to Delhi. The temples and towns of Tamil Nadu were again targeted for loot in the 1320s. However, when the news of another invasion spread in Tamil lands, the community moved into the Western Ghats or buried numerous sculptures and treasures in the land and concealed chambers underneath temple sites before the Muslim armies reached them. A large number of these were rediscovered in archaeological excavations at the site in and after 1979. The Delhi Sultan appointed a Muslim governor, who seceded within a few years from the Delhi Sultanate and began the Madurai Sultanate. The Muslim Madurai Sultanate was relatively short-lived; the Sultan's rule in Madurai ended with Ala-ud-din Sikandarsha (1371-1378 CE) due to the rise of the Vijayanagara Empire.

It is believed that the Vijayanagara rulers undertook renovations of several major temples including Mayuranathaswamy temple that had previously been damaged or desecrated during the campaigns of the Delhi Sultanate. There is no information about or inscriptions found for in the temple about Nayaks of Thanjavur and Maratha of Thanjavur.

Major renovations were carried out between 1907 and 1927 by Devakottai AL. VR. P. Veerappa Chettiar and Pethaperumal Chettiar, during which some of old structures and inscriptions on the walls were removed or altered. However, the old stone sculptures from the Sembiyan Mahadevi period were preserved in the devakoshtas.

In May 1927, a temple entry of Dalits was organised on a big scale by the proponents of the Self Respect Movement thereby resulting in a huge clash.

== Architecture ==
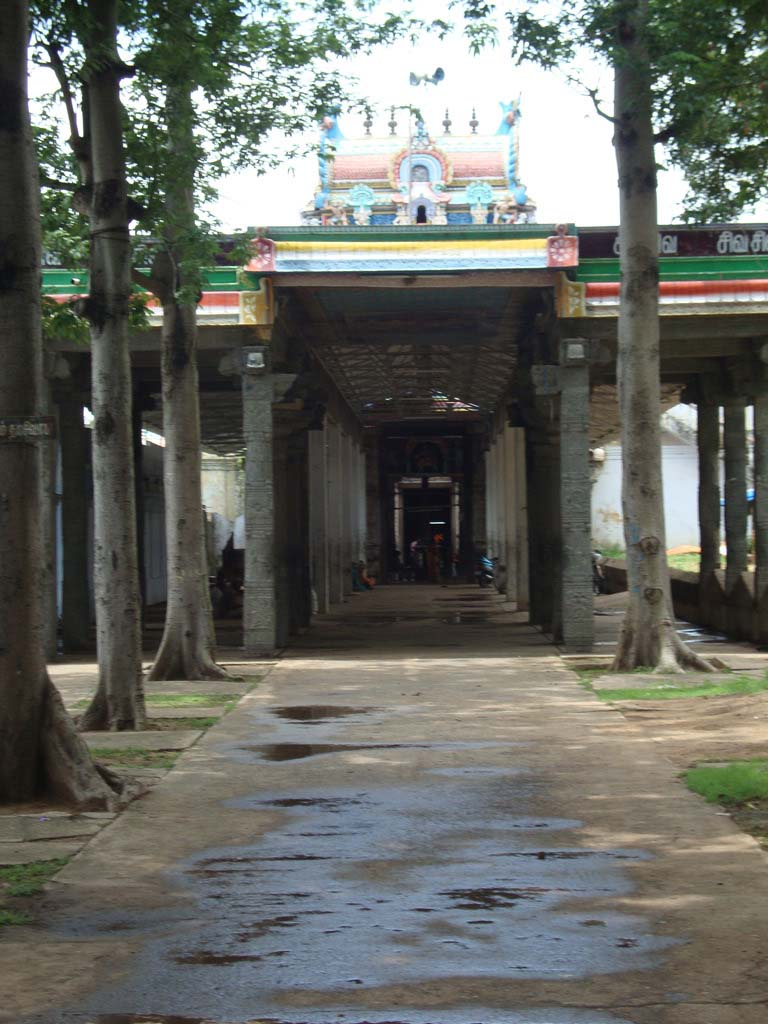
16-pillared hall

The temple architecture is adheres to Chola and Dravidian design principles as described in traditional texts such as Mayamata and Visvakarmiya. The vimana is structured in six divisions from base to finial, drawing comparisons to human anatomy, with terms like pada for the base and sikhara for the head. The central vimana is a single-tiered (ekatala) structure in the Dravidian style, comprising six divisions: the triyanga upapitha base with moldings such as upana, kantha, and vajana; padabandha adhistana featuring jagati, tripatta kumuda, pattika, and kanta; bhitti walls with 18 brahma kantha pilasters and devakosthas housing high-relief icons of Dakshinamurti (south), Lingodbhavamurti (west), and Brahma (north); prastara entablature with bhutavari, kapota, and yalivari; circular griva with grivakosthas reflecting the salakosthas below; and a sikhara adorned with idaikattu, padmam, kattumalai, kannadi sattam, mahapadma, and topped by a copper stupika. The pranala drain emerges from a vyala mouth on the north side, a feature comparable to that of the Brihadeeswarar Temple in Thanjavur.

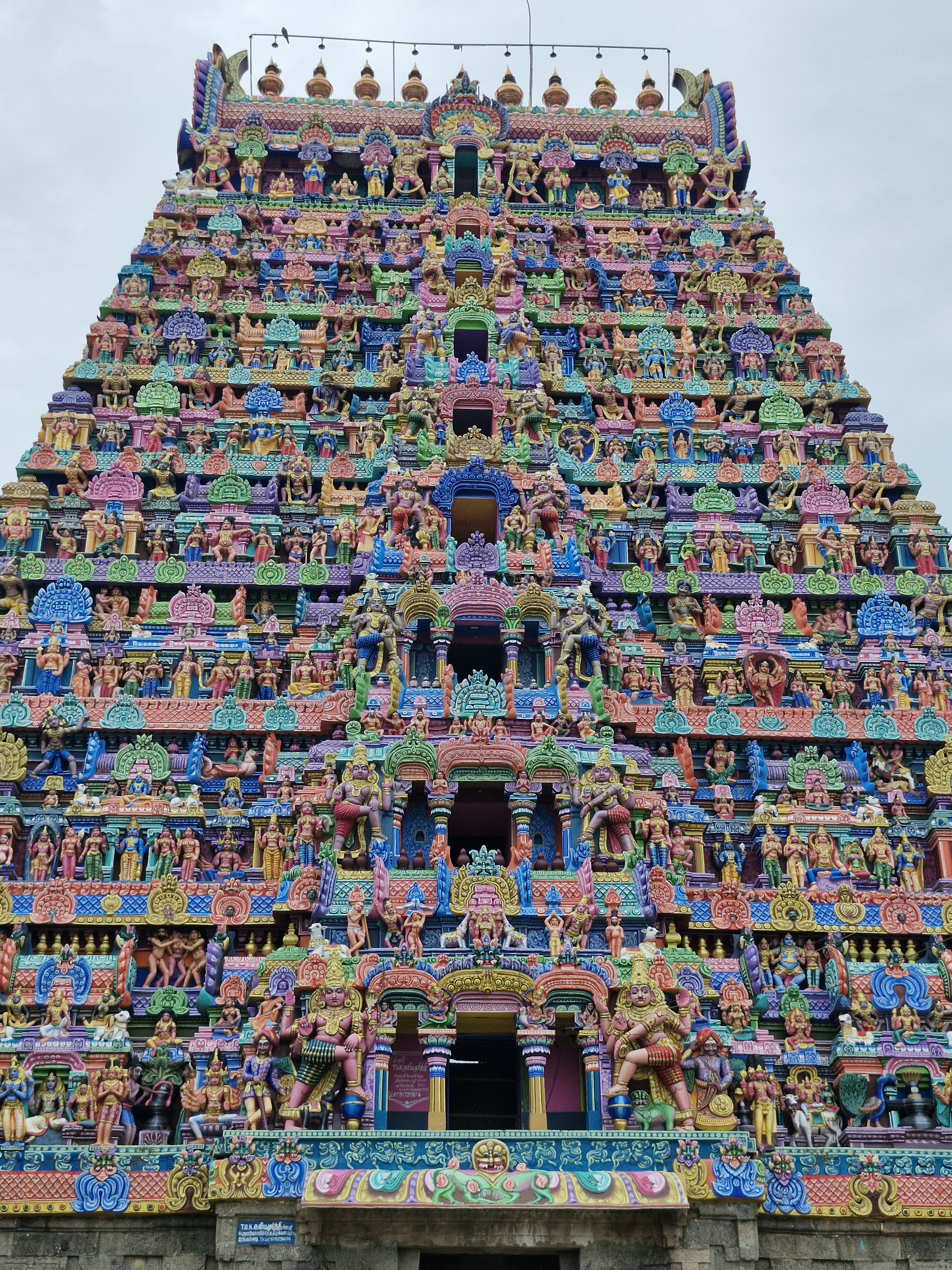
Gopuram Close-up view

The temple complex is 719 feet (219 m) long and 520 feet (160 m) wide. The main gopura at the eastern entrance to the temple is nine storeys high, and inner gopura is three stories high. The main gopura measures 194 feet (59 m), has a granite base, brick upper tiers, pilasters, and kalasas. The Rajagopuram showcases an enormous entrance with pillars portraying Vinayaka, figures in motion, Villendiya Velan, and Markandeya, accompanied by dvarapalas and crowned with kalasas. Mandapas consist of two antaralas linking the garbhagriha to the ardhamandapa and mukhamandapa, featuring niches for Bhikshatana and Durga; the ardhamandapa retains complete corbels; and the mahamandapa (rectangular, flat-roofed) sustained by 2.70m-high round and square columns (three sadurams with octagonal sections), sloped corbels, balustraded porches, 12th-century inscriptions, and Puranic murals on ceilings.

Nandi mandapas are positioned axially in the second prakara: the front one features octagonal shafts, sloping corbels (12th century), rounded sikhara, and plaster sculptures; the back has a flat roof, six square pillars, and pumunai corbels evolving into later styles. The idol of Durga near the northern entrance of the temple is expertly sculpted and differs from those in other temples. On the temple walls, there is the sculpture of a devotee trying to sever his head as an offering to the God.

There is an expansive temple tank in the centre of the complex. People travel in large numbers to Mayiladuthurai to bathe in this tank on the day of the new moon in the Tamil month of Aippasi (November–December). This bath purifies a person of sins because the waters of the river Ganges and other Indian rivers mingle with the waters of the Kaveri river in this tank on this particular day.

== Festivals ==
The temple has a large sacred tank known as the Brahmma Theertham, situated on its eastern side, with a mandapa at the centre. The Theerthavari festival is held in this tank on Chitra Pournami, Vaikasi Visakam, and Margazhi Thiruvathirai, in the presence of Lord Mayuranathar and Goddess Abhayambikai. The ten-day Vasanthotsavam celebrated in the Tamil month of Vaikasi (May–June) is followed by the Theppotsavam, the temple's annual float festival. During the month of Aippasi (October–November), a thirty-day Theerthavari festival takes place, during which processions are held daily. On the first day (Amavasya) and the concluding day, the Pancha Moorthis from the Mayiladuthurai temple, Vallalar Koil, and the southern and northern Kasi Viswanathar temples, along with Ayaarappar, assemble at the Brahmma Theertham, and twenty-five deities give darshan to devotees. A distinctive feature of this festival is the procession of Goddess Abhayambikai, who is taken in the form of a peacock through the four temple streets and to the banks of the River Cauvery, where she is believed to symbolically unite with Lord Mayuranathar.

The Thula Snanam, the ritual bathing in the Cauvery River during the month of Aippasi, and the Mudavan Muzhukku on the first day of the following Karthikai month, attract pilgrims from across India. Bathing in the river on these days is considered spiritually purifying of sins. The temple also hosts the annual Mayura Natyanjali, a classical dance festival dedicated to Lord Nataraja. In addition to these annual celebrations, six daily Sandhi pujas—Ushakkalam, Kala Sandhi, Uchikkalam, Sayaratchai, Erandamkalam, and Ardhajamam—are performed at the temple, maintaining its traditional ritual practices and devotional significance.

== Mayiladuthurai group of temples ==
=== Pancha Dakshinamurthy Temples ===
Around Mayiladuthurai town, five Dakshinamurti temples collectively form the Pancha Dakshinamurthy Sthalam, located in the vicinity of the Mayuranathaswami temple. Visiting and offering prayers at the five temples in a single day, especially on Thursday, full moon day and during one's Janma Nakshatram(birth star) is believed to bring divine blessings. The five temples are,

1. Mayuranathaswami temple – Mayiladuthurai (Center).
2. Medha Dakshinamurthy temple (Vallalar Koil) – Thiruindalur (North).
3. Vakiswarar temple – Peruncheri (South).
4. Margasahayeswarar temple (Vazhikaatum Vallalar) – Moovalur (West).
5. Thuraikattum Vallalar (Uchiravaneswarar) temple – Vilanagar (East).

=== Saptha stana temples ===
A gorup of seven temples around Mayiladuthurai form Mayiladuthurai Saptha stana temples. This group of Saptha stana temples gendrally found in the Delta district. The group of seven temples celebrating the festival annually is celebrated to commemorate the marriage of Nandi, Shiva's foremost attendant. It marks the journey Lord Shiva undertook through seven temples (Saptha Sthanas) to bless and celebrate Nandi's wedding, re-enacting the ritual of Sapthapadi (seven steps in marriage). The seven temples are,

1. Mayuranathaswami temple – Mayiladuthurai.
2. Margasahayeswarar temple (Vazhikaatum Vallalar) – Moovalur.
3. Aiyaarappar temple - Koranad, Mayiladuthurai.
4. Kasi Vishwanathar temple - Lagadam, Mayiladuthurai.
5. Punugeeswarar temple - Koranad, Mayiladuthurai.
6. Brahmapureeswarar temple - Sitharkadu, Mayiladuthurai.
7. Azhagiyanathar temple - Sholampettai, Mayiladuthurai.

== Gallery ==
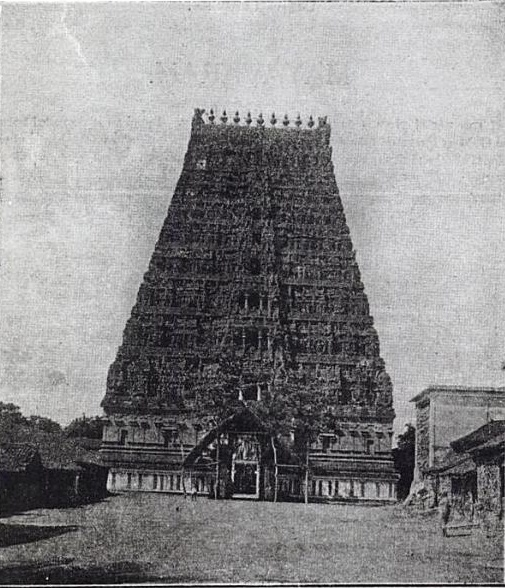
Gopuram view year 1920

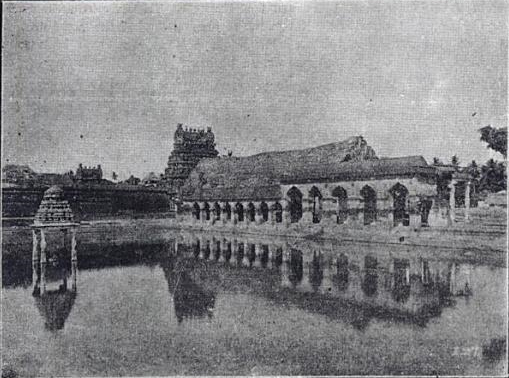
Temple tank year 1920

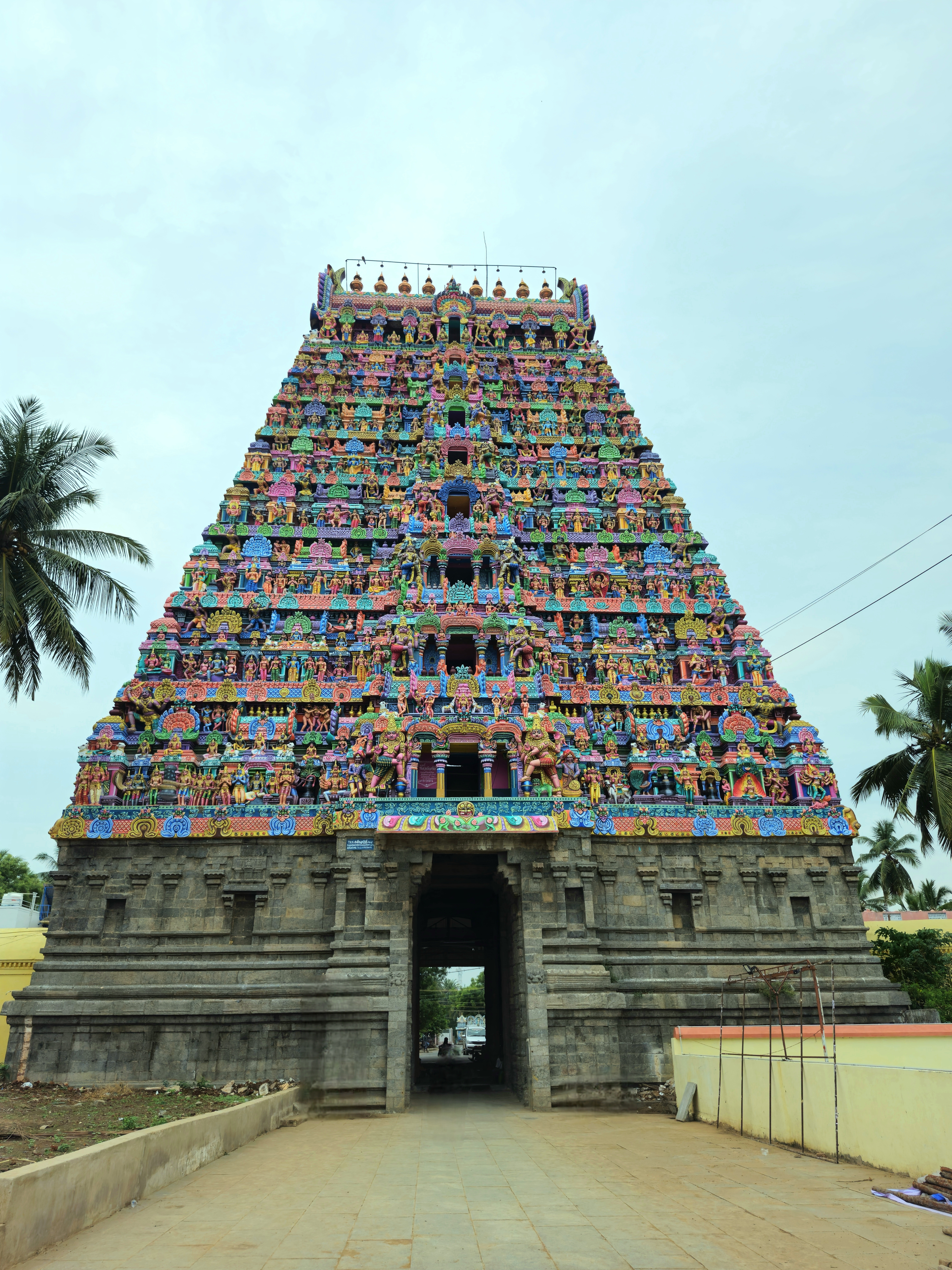
Gopuram view year 2024

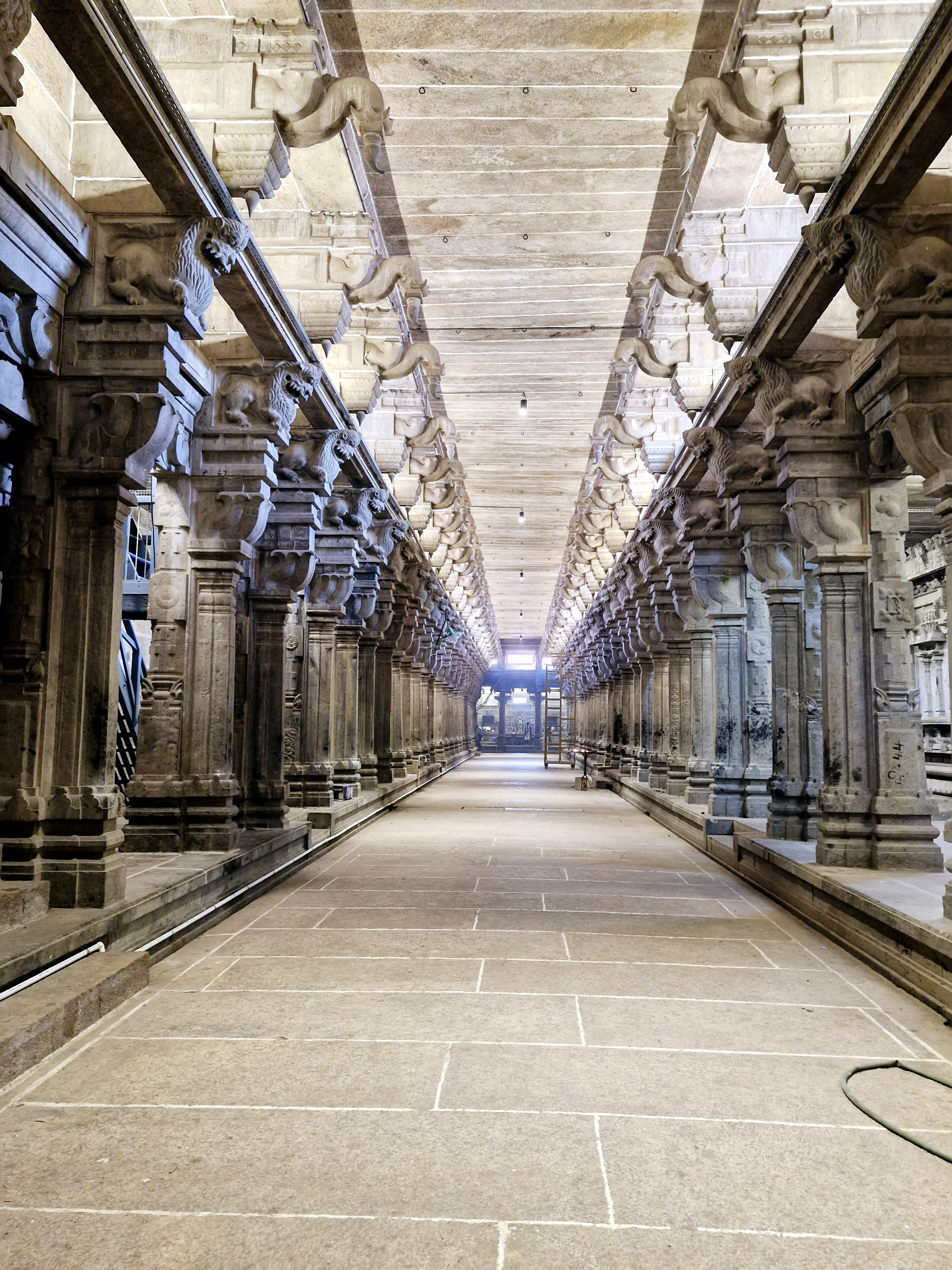
Prakaram (Passage)

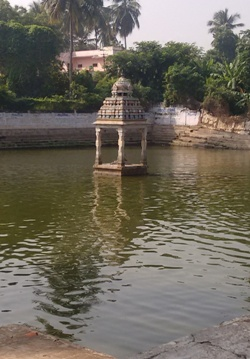
Temple tank

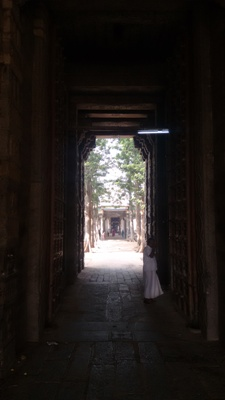
View from entrance

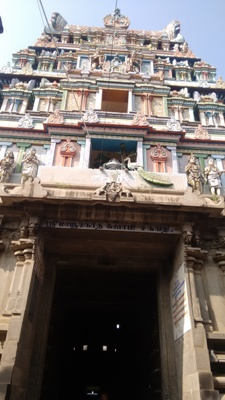
Inner gopura

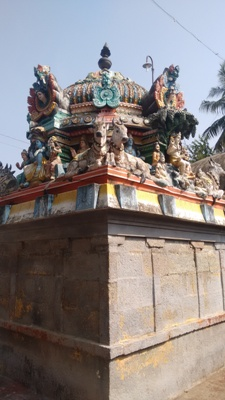
Adhimayurathaswami vimana

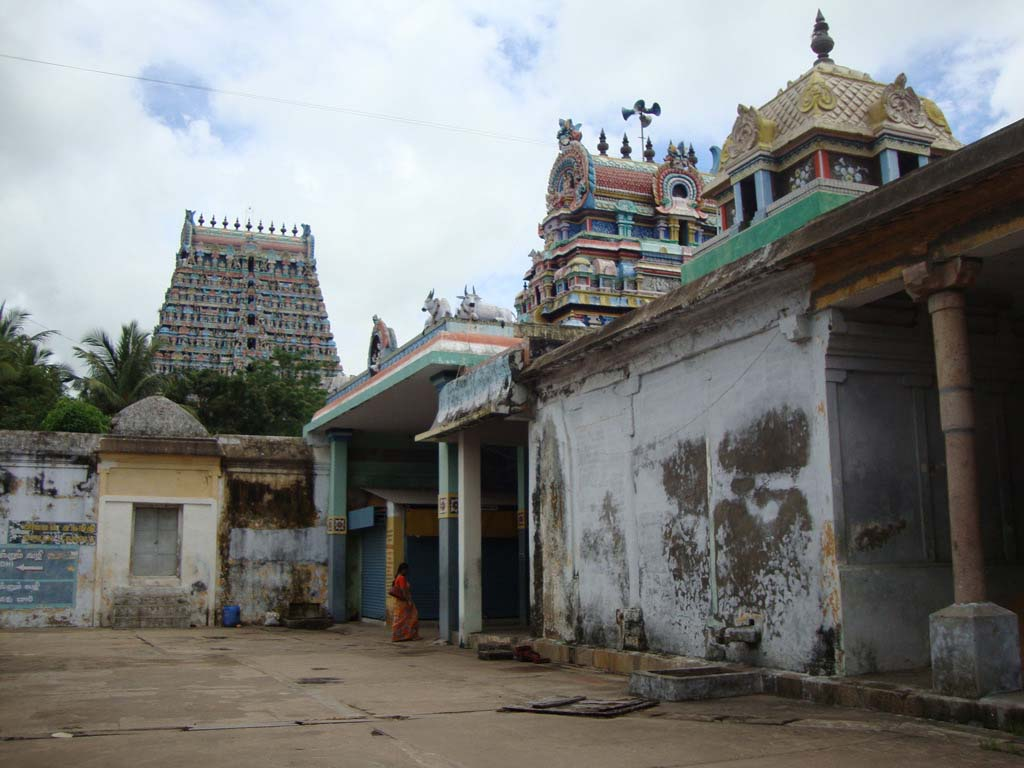
Sri Abayambigai entrance

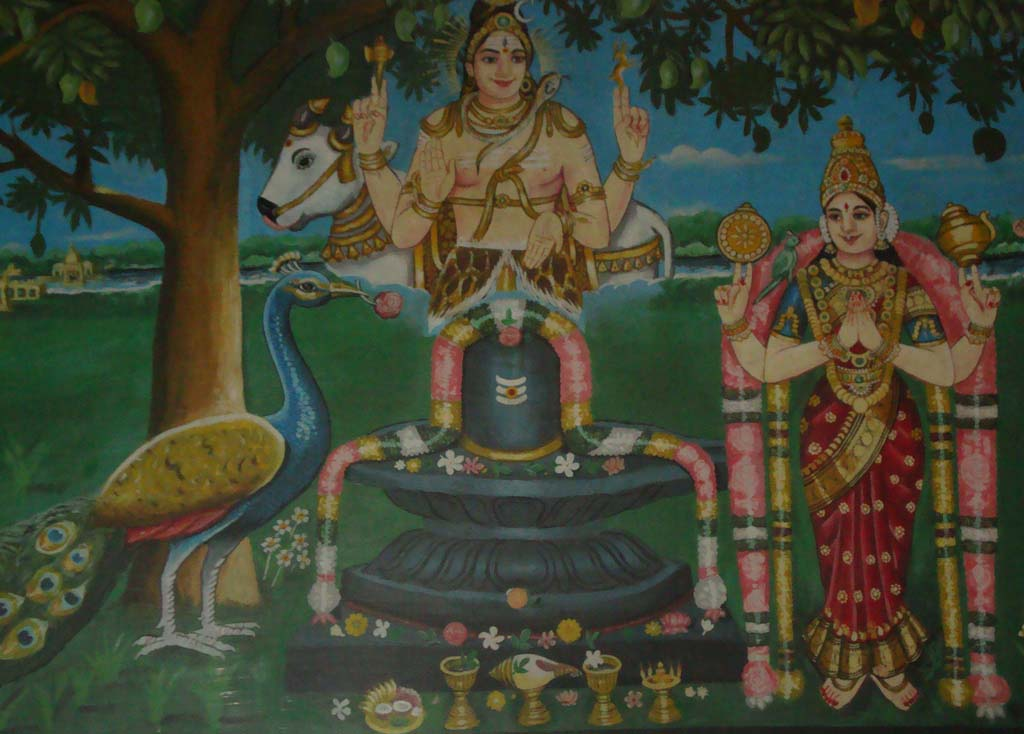
Parvathi adored Siva as a peahen

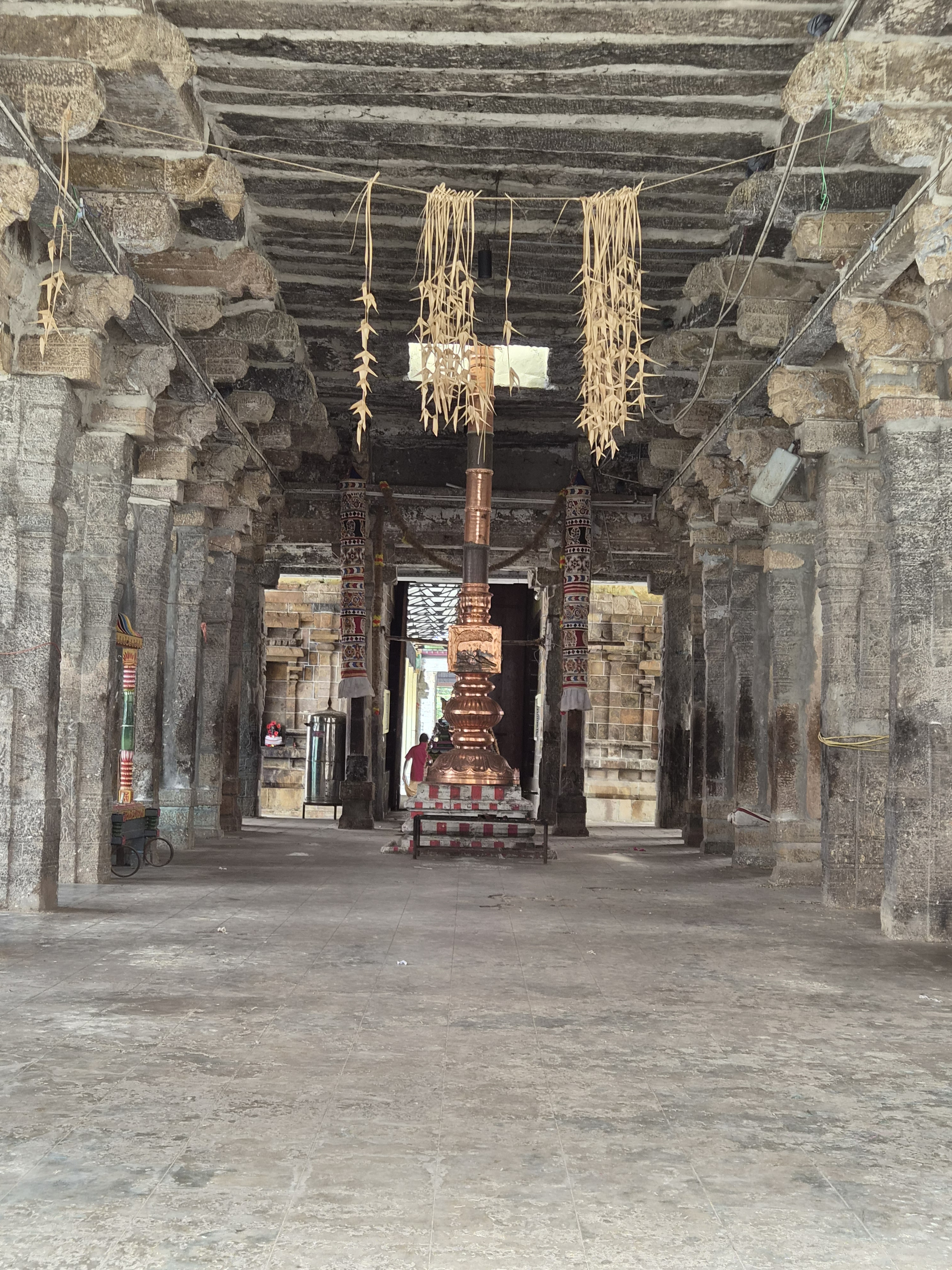
Interior mandapam pillared hall

Carved stone pillar

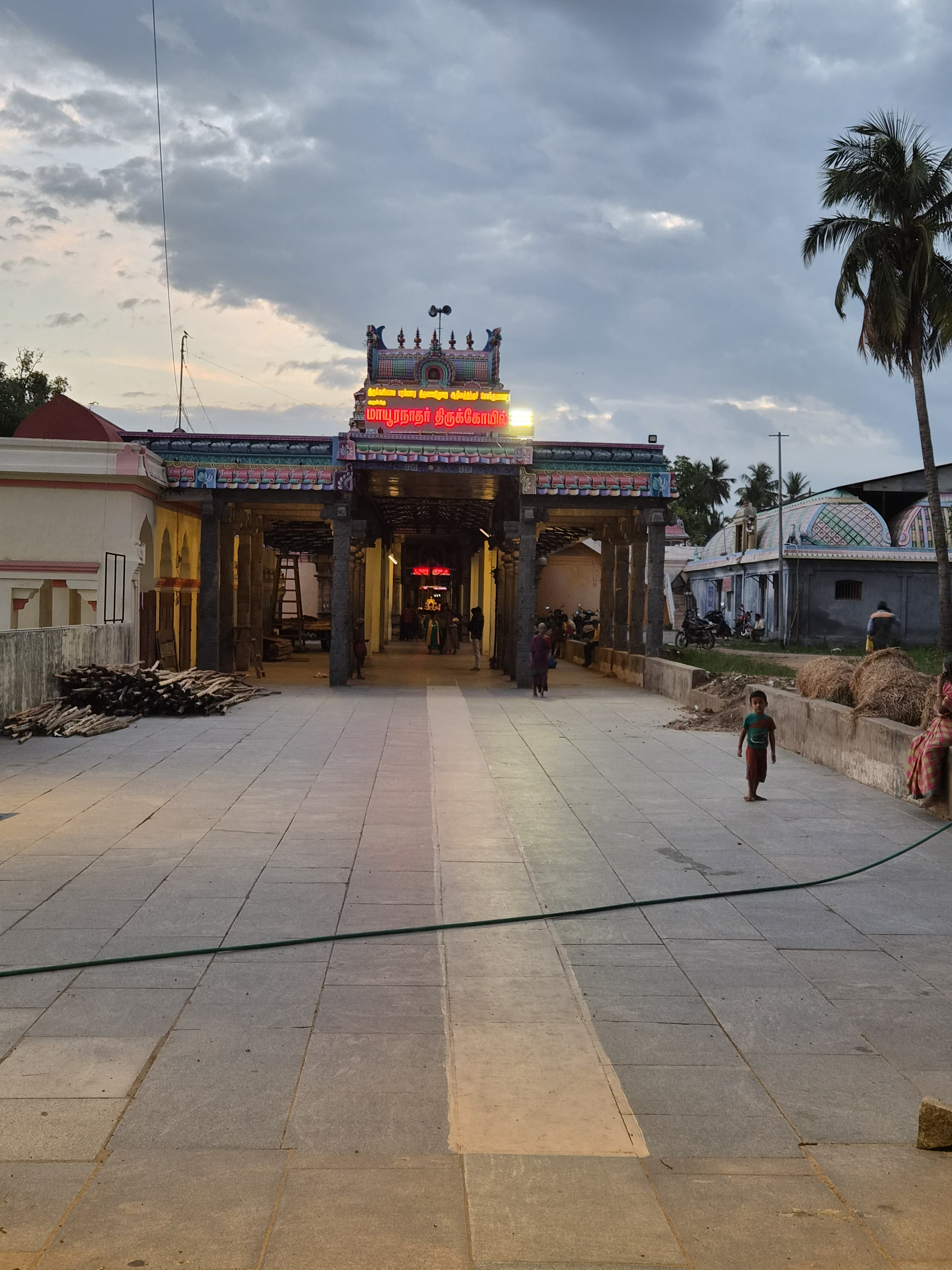
Outer entrance - 16-pillared hall

== Bibliography ==
- P. V. Jagadisa Ayyar (1920). South Indian shrines: illustrated. Madras Times Printing and Pub. Co.
- S. R., Balasubrahmanyam (16 January 1971). Early Chola Temples (PDF) (1st ed.). ORIENT LONGMAN LIMITED. p. 197.
- S. R., Balasubrahmanyam (23 April 1978). Later Chola Temples (PDF) (1st ed.). MUDGALA TRUST. p. 269.
- P.V., JAGADISA AYYAR (1993). South Indian Shrines: Illustrated. revised: Asian Educational Services. p. 271. ISBN 9788120601512.
- K, Seetha (2020). Sri Mayuranathar Temple at Mayiladuthurai - A Historical Study (Thesis). Annamalai Nagar, Chidambaram: Departnment of History Annamalai University.
- B., Venkataraman (1976). Temple Art under the Chola Queens (1 ed.). Faridabad, Hariyana: Thomson Press (India) Limited. p. 37.
- R, Vijayalakshmy (2001). An Introduction to Religion and Philosophy - Tevaram and tivviyappirapantam (1st ed.). Chennai: International Institute of Tamil Studies, Chennai. pp. 366–368.
