= R. Nagaswamy =

Indian academic (1930–2022)

Padma Bhushan R. Nagaswamy
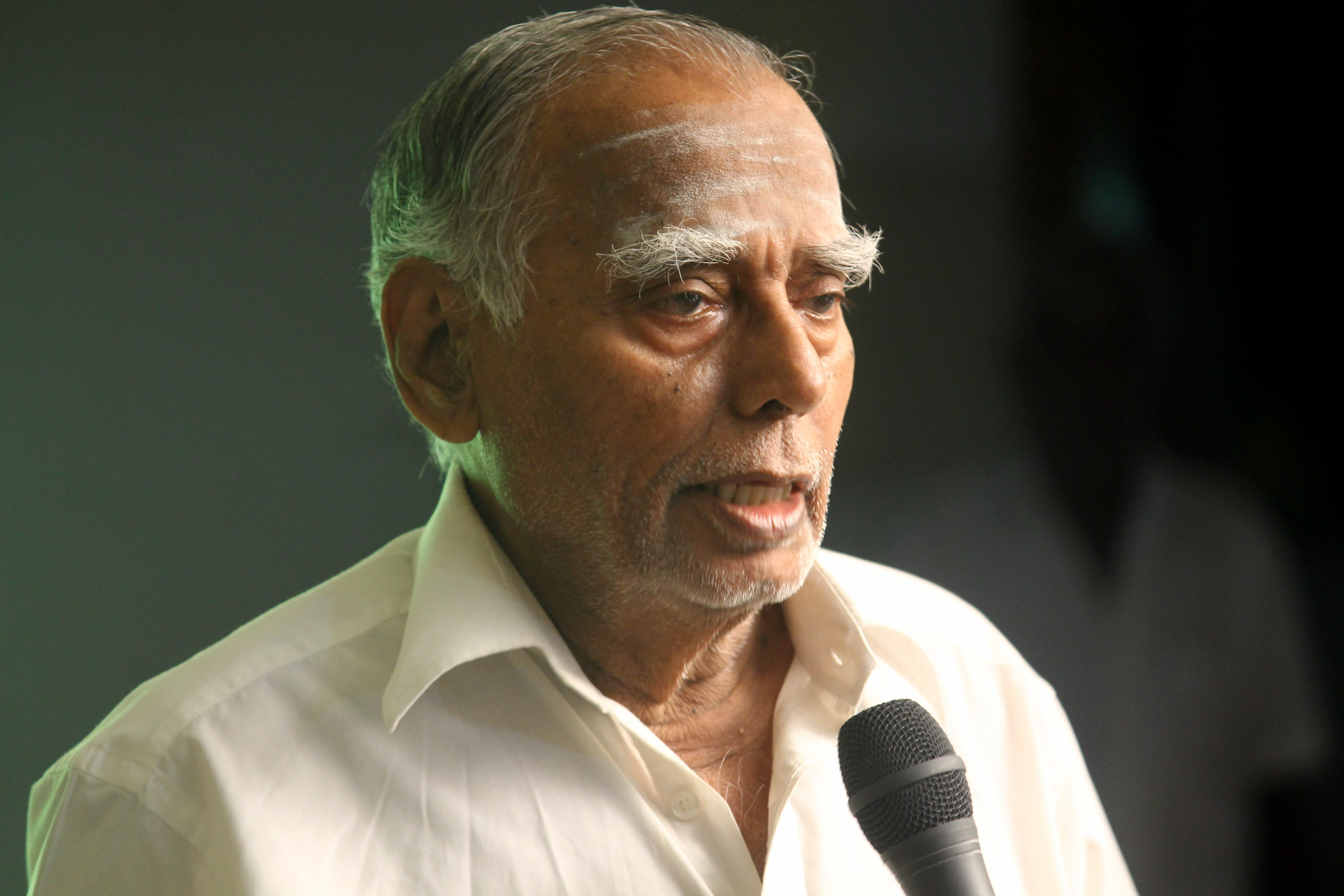
- Nagaswamy at a lecture in 2015

Director of the Tamil Nadu Archaeology Department
- In office 1966–1988
- Preceded by: T. N. Ramachandran (Note: T. N. Ramachandran was designated as a 'Special Officer'.)
- Succeeded by: Natana Kasinathan

Personal details
- Born: Ramachandran Nagaswamy; 10 August 1930 Madras, Madras Presidency, British Raj
- Died: 23 January 2022 (aged 91) Chennai, India
- Occupation: Art historian, archaeologist
- Awards: Kalaimamani (1994); Padma Bhushan (2018)

Ramachandran Nagaswamy (10 August 1930 – 23 January 2022) was an Indian historian, archaeologist and epigraphist who was known for his work on temple inscriptions and art history of Tamil Nadu. He was an authority on Chola bronzes.

Nagaswamy became the inaugural director of the Tamil Nadu Archaeology Department in 1966, serving in that capacity till 1988. He also founded the annual Chidambaram Natyanjali festival in 1980. In 2018, he was awarded India's third-highest civilian award, the Padma Bhushan.

== Early life ==
Nagaswamy was born on 10 August 1930, the son of Ramachandran Sastrigal. He graduated in Sanskrit from the University of Madras and pursued a master's degree in Sanskrit. Nagaswamy obtained his PhD in arts and archaeology from the University of Poona. Nagaswamy underwent archaeological training under the Archaeological Survey of India (ASI) and in 1959, joined the Government Museum, Chennai as curator for art and archaeology.

== Career ==
Nagaswamy served as curator for art and archaeology in the Government Museum in Chennai from 1959 to 1963. In 1963, he was appointed assistant special officer for archaeology for Tamil Nadu state and from 1966 to 1988, he headed the newly formed Tamil Nadu Archaeology Department as its first director, serving until his retirement.

Nagaswamy made archaeology a popular subject in Tamil Nadu, especially among children through publication of pocket book guides. He was responsible for involving several thousand school and college students in cleaning and preserving nearby historical places and monuments. He also popularized monuments by bringing out popular guides in the form of newspaper, priced at ten paise per copy. He was responsible for protecting several historic monuments like the first-century Chera inscriptions at Pugalur, the palace site of the Imperial Cholas at Gangaikonda Cholapuram, the famous 17th-century Thirumalai Nayak palace at Madurai, the 17th-century Danish Fort at Tranquebar, and the birthplace of poet Subramania Bharati at Ettayapuram besides excavating the palace site of Virapandya Kattabomman at Panchalankurichi. He also led the first under-sea survey in Tamil Nadu when he surveyed the region off the Poompuhar coast in Mayiladuthurai.

Nagaswamy composed dance dramas chronicling the lives of the Chola rulers Raja Raja Chola and Rajendra Chola I, and the poets Arunagirinathar, Manimekhala, and Appar. He wrote on South Indian works and statues and was considered an authority on Chola bronze statues. He founded the annual Chidambaram Natyanjali festival in 1980.

=== Awards ===
- 1994: Received title of Kalaimamani Award by the Government of Tamil Nadu, which is the highest state honour in the field of Arts
- 2018: Awarded India's third highest civilian honour, the Padma Bhushan.

=== Honours ===
Nagaswamy appeared as an expert witness in the London High Court, in the "London Nataraja case" in the 1980s, which resulted in a Chola-era Nataraja statue that had been smuggled to London being returned to India.

=== Controversy ===
Nagaswamy's candidature to a committee in CICT Central Institute of Classical Tamil was objected by Dravida Munetra Kazhagam leader M. K. Stalin. Though Nagaswamy had clarified that he had not received any communication from the central which is funding CICT entirely.

== Personal life ==
Nagaswamy was married to Parvathi with whom he had two sons and two daughters. He died at his home in Besant Nagar, Chennai, on 23 January 2022, at the age of 91.

== Publications ==
- Nagaswamy, R. (1980). Art and Culture of Tamil Nadu. Sundeep Prakashan.
- Vidya Dehejia; Richard H. Davis; R. Nagaswamy; Karen Pechilis Prentiss (2002). The sensuous and the sacred: Chola bronzes from South India. American Federation of Arts. ISBN 978-0-295-98284-7.
- R. Nagaswamy (2003). Facets of South Indian Art and Architecture. Aryan Books International. ISBN 978-81-7305-244-6.
- Nagaswamy, R. (2003). "Democracy of a high standard—ancient example". The Hindu. Archived from the original on 5 January 2004.
- Nagaswamy, R. (2006). Art and Religion of the Bhairavas. Tamil Arts Academy.
- Nagaswamy, R. (2010). Monumental Legacy Series: Mahabalipuram. Oxford University Press India. ISBN 978-0-19-807127-3.
- Nagaswamy, R. (2019). Tirukkural: an abridgement of sastras. Tamil Arts Academy & Giri Trading Agency Private Limited. ISBN 978-81-7950-787-2. OCLC 1054118755.
