= T. N. Ramachandran =

Indian art historian (died 2021)

Director of the Tamil Nadu Archaeology Department
- In office 1961–1966
- Preceded by: Post established
- Succeeded by: R. Nagaswamy

Personal details
- Born: Madras, Madras Presidency, British India
- Occupation: Art historian; archaeologist

Tiruvengadu Narayanayajwa Ramachandran was an Indian art historian, artist, archaeologist and a Sanskrit scholar, specialising in the study and exposition of various aspects of Indian art. He was born to Narayanan (a Sanskrit scholar) & Visalakshi (an able administrator). He was the author of several monographs, and was the director-general of archaeology in India. He conducted research and wrote extensively on various subjects during his tenure as curator of archaeology at the National Museum, New Delhi.

== Career ==
Sporadic research by Ramachandran on certain groups of antiquities at the National Museum revealed the importance of the objects and thus made the Museum well known. Only after the formation of the Section were more detailed studies of the antiquities of the Museum undertaken. Arachnologist and student of archaeology, Frederic Henry Gravely, collaborated with Ramachandran on the scientific basis for identifying the period of metal images between 1925-1935.

Ramachandran and Y.D. Sharma visited Afghanistan between May and July 1956, in order to explore and investigate the art traditions, epigraphical records, and archaeological remains. During the survey, a number of sites were visited and the antiquarian remains housed in museums were also extensively studied.

Ramachandran identified images at Brhadiswara temple at Tanjore, as the earliest extant visual representation of Bharata’s karanas. Apart from the literary evidence for the popularity of Bharata’s karanams, the dance sculptures in the temples of Tamil Nadu prove beyond doubt that the Tamils took great pains in preserving Bharata’s style. When the Chola king Rajaraja built the Tanjore temple at the beginning of the 11th century, dance art enjoyed such a high status in society that he had the Karana figures chiseled as sculptures in the first tier of the Vimana. He has taught dancers, including Bharatanatyam exponent and scholar Bala Devi Chandrashekar, Ramaa Bharadvaj, and Padma Subrahmanyam, Bharatnatyam Dancer, performing artist, and scholar, who conducted extensive research on Karana sculptures, at Annamalai University under his guidance.

Ramachandran was awarded the Padma Bhushan in 1964. He has traveled widely all over the world, participated in international seminars, delivered lectures at the invitation of several universities, which have been published as books. He has delivered endowment lectures at many universities in India. He has many books and papers on architecture, iconography, epigraphy, numismatics, and literature to his credit.

== Works ==
Some of T. N. Ramachandran's works include:

- Buddhist Sculptures from Stupa near Goli Village, Guntur District
- Nagapattinam and Other Buddhist Bronzes
- Tirupparuthikundram and its Temple
- Tempera Painting in Sitabhinji, District Keonjhar, Orissa
- History of Buddhism in the Tamil Kingdoms of South India
- The Three Main Styles of Temple Architecture Recognised by Silpa Sastras (F. H. Gravely and T. N. Ramachandran), 1934
- Catalogue of Hindu Metal Images in the Government Museum, Madras (T. N. Ramachandran and F.H Gravely), 1932
