= Tamil units of measurement =

System of measurements traditionally used in ancient Tamil-speaking South India

The Tamil units of measurement are a system of measurements that was traditionally used in ancient Tamil-speaking parts of South India.

These ancient measurement systems spanned systems of counting, distances, volumes, time, weight as well as tools used to do so. While modern India uses the metric system, some of these older measurement systems, especially those of counting, are still used today.

Other units that have persisted are those of area – the ma (not to be confused with the dollar-cent) and the ‘ground’, both used to measure land and the molam which has been relegated to measuring the length of a sandanam garland sold on streets.

There are several similarities between the measurement system used in Tamil Nadu and that used by the Indus Valley civilisation. Excavation studies from Keeḻadi reveal existence of an older non-vedic civilisation in Tamil Nadu, and suggest possibilities of ancient Indian mathematicians in Tamil Nadu.

== Units of time ==
Tamil units of time (from smallest to largest)
Unit	Divisions	Equivalent	Notes
1 குழிகள் (kuḻigaḷ)	none	6 2/3 milliseconds	
1 கண்ணிமைகள் (kaṇṇimaigaḷ)	none	62.5 milliseconds	
1 மிய் (miy)	10 குழிகள் (kuḻigaḷ)	66 2/3 milliseconds	The time taken by the young human eyes to blink once
1 கைநொடி (kainoḍi)	2 கண்ணிமைகள் (kaṇṇimaigaḷ)	0.125 seconds	
1 மாத்திரை (māttirai)	2 கைநொடி (kainoḍi)	0.25 seconds	
1 சிற்றுழி (நொடி) (ciṟṟuḻi (noḍi))	6 மிய்கள் (miygaḷ)	0.4 seconds	The time taken for a bubble^{[a]} to travel a distance of 1 சாண் (cāṇ)
1 குறு (kuṟu)	2 மாத்திரைகள் (māttiraigaḷ)	0.5 seconds	
1 வினாடி (viṉāḍi)	2 நொடிகள் (noḍigaḷ)	0.8 seconds	The time taken by the adult human heart to beat once
1 உயிர் (uyir)	2 குறு (kuṟu)	1 second	
1 சாணிகம் (cāṇigam)	2 உயிர் (uyir)	2 seconds	
1 அணு (aṇu)	2 சாணிகம் (cāṇigam)	4 seconds	
1 துளி (tuḷi)	6 அணுக்கள் (aṇukkaḷ)	24 seconds	
1 நாழிகை வினாடி (nāḻigai-viṉāḍi)	6 அணுக்கள் (aṇukkaḷ)	24 seconds	
1 கணம் (kaṇam)	10 துளிகள் (tuḷigaḷ)	4 minutes	
1 நாழிகை (nāḻigai)	6 கணங்கள் (kaṇangaḷ)	24 minutes	
1 சாமம் (cāmam)	15 கணம் (kaṇam)	1 hour	
1 சிறுபொழுது (ciṟupoḻutu)	4 சாமம் (cāmam)	4 hours	
1 நாள் (nāḷ)	6 சிறுபொழுதுகள் (ciṟu-poḻutugaḷ)	1 day	
1 வாரம் (vāram)	7 நாட்கள் (nāṭkaḷ)	1 week	
1 அழுவம் (aḻuvaluvamam)	15 நாட்கள் (nāṭkaḷ)	15 days	
1 திங்கள் (tingaḷ)	none	1 lunar month	
1 பெரும்பொழுது (perum-poḻutu)	2 திங்கள் (tingaḷ)	2 lunar months	
1 ஆண்டு (āṇdu)	6 பெரும்பொழுது (perum-poḻutu)	1 year	
1 வட்டம் (vaṭṭam)	64 ஆண்டுகள் (āṇdukaḷ)	64 years	1 cycle
1 ஊழி (ūḻi)	64 வட்டம் (vaṭṭam)	4,096 years	1 epoch

=== Notes ===
A. created by blowing air through a bamboo tube into a vessel 1 சாண் (cāṇ) high, full of water

== Units of area ==
Units of area measurement (from smallest to largest)
Unit	Divisions	Equivalent	Notes
1 தாக்கு (thakku)	none	7.56 square feet	
1 sq கஜம் (kajam)	none	5/242 of a cent	
1 வீசம் (vīsam)	none	36 square feet	
1 குழி (kuḻi)	4 வீசம் (vīsam)	44 Cent	
1 perch	none	0.625 cents	In Jaffna, Sri Lanka
1 lacham	12 kulies	4 1/6 cents	In Paddy Culture
1 parappu	10 perches	6.25 cents	In Jaffna, Sri Lanka
1 lacham	18 kulies	6.25 cents	In Varaku Culture
1 மரக்கால் விதைப்பது (marakkaḷ vitaippatu)	none	8 cents	area required for planting rice
1 குறுணி (kuṟuṇi)	none	8 cents	
1 பதக்கு (patakku)	2 மரக்கால் விதைப்பது (marakkaḷ vitaippatu) or 2 குறுணி (kuṟuṇi)	16 cents	
1 முக்குறுணி (mukkuṟuṇi)	3 மரக்கால் விதைப்பது (marakkaḷ vitaippatu) or 3 குறுணி (kuṟuṇi)	24 cents	
1 மா (mā)	100 குழி (kuḻi)	1,600 square yards	
1 காணி (kāṇi)	4 மா (mā)	6,400 square yards	
1 வேலி (vēļi)	5 காணி (kāṇi)	32,000 square yards	
none	16 parappu	1 acre	In Jaffna, Sri Lanka
none	16 lachams	1 acre	In Varaku Culture
none	24 lachams	1 acre	In Paddy Culture

== Units of ancient trade ==
=== Balance weights ===
Gold Weights
Unit	Divisions	Equivalent	Notes
1 நல் எடை (nel eḍai)	none		
1 குன்றிமணி (kuṉṟimaṇi)	4 நல் எடை (nel eḍai)		
1 மஞ்சாடி (māñcāḍi)	2 குன்றிமணி (kuṉṟimaṇi)		
1 பணவெடை (paṇaveḍai)	2 குன்றிமணி (kuṉṟimaṇi)		
1 கழஞ்சு (kaḻañcu)	5 பணவெடை (paṇaveḍai)		
1 வராகனெடை (varāgaṉeḍai)	8 பணவெடை (paṇaveḍai)		
1 கஃசு (kaqhsu)	4 கழஞ்சு (kaḻañcu)		
1 பலம்	4 கஃசு (kaqhsu)		

Product weights
Unit	Divisions	Equivalent	Notes
1 varāgaṉeḍai	32 kuṉṟimaṇi		
1 palam	10 varāgaṉeḍai		
1 veesai	40 palam		
1 tulām	6 veesai		
1 maṇangu	8 veesai		
1 kā	25 veesai		
1 pāram	20 maṇangu		

=== Grain volume ===
- 1 kuṇam = smallest unit of volume
- 9 kuṇam = 1 mummi
- 11 mummi = 1 aṇu
- 7 aṇu = 1 immi
- 7 immi = 1 uminel
- 1 sittigai = 7 uminel
- 360 nel = 1 sevidu
- 5 sevidu = 1 āḻākku
- 2 āḻākku = 1 uḻakku
- 2 uḻakku = 1 uri
- 2 uri = 1 padi
- 8 padi = 1 marakkaal (kuṟuṇi)
- 2 marakkāl (kuṟuṇi) = 1 padakku
- 2 padakku = 1 tōṇi
- 3 tōṇi = 1 kalam (= 96 padi)
- 5 marakkāl = 1 paṟai
- 80 paṟai = 1 karisai
- 96 padi = 1 pothi (mōdai)
- 21 marakkal = 1 Kottai
- 22 mākāni = 100 g

1 padi = 1800 avarai pods = 12,800 miḷagu seeds = 14,400 nel grains = 14,800 payaṟu grains = 38,000 arisi grains = 115,200 sesame ellu seeds

=== Fluid volume ===
- 5 sevidu = 1 āḻākku
- 2 mahani = 1 āḻākku (arai kal padi)
- 2 āḻākku = 1 uḻakku (Kal padi)
- 2 uḻakku = 1 uri (Arai padi)
- 2 uri = 1 padi
- 4 padi= 1 marakkaal
- 2 marakkāl (kuṟuṇi) = 1 padakku
- 2 padakku = 1 tōṇi
- 21 Marakkal = 1 Kottai

=== Length ===
- 1 Koan = (115.8953125 picometre)
- 10 Koan = 1 Nunnanu (0.1158953125 nanometre)
- 10 Nunnanu = 1 Aṇu (atom) (1.158953125 nanometre)
- 8 Aṇu = 1 Kadirtugal (9.271625 nanometre)
- 8 Kadirtugal = 1 Tusumbu (74.173 nanometre)
- 8 Tusumbu = 1 Mayirnuni (0.593384 micrometre)
- 8 Mayirnuni = 1 Nunnmanal (4.74707 micrometre)
- 8 Nunnmanal = 1 Siru-kadugu (37.976563 micrometre)
- 8 Siru-kadugu = 1 Yel (303.8125 micrometre or 0.3038125 millimetre)
- 8 Yel = 1 Nel (2.4305 millimetre)
- 8 nel = 1 viral = 8^8 aṇu (atom) = 1.9444 centimetre
- 12 viral = 1 sāṇ = 100 immi= 23.3333 centimetre = 9 inch
- 2 sāṇ = 1 muḻam = 46.6666 centimetre = 1.5 feet
- 2 sāṇ = 1 muḻam
- 2 muḻam = 1 yard = 3 feet = 1 yard
- 2 yard(yaar) = 1 pāgam
- 110 pāgam = 1 furlong
- 8 furlong = 1 mile
- 5 furlong = 1 kilometre or 1000 metre
- 625 pāgam = 1 kādam = 5000 sāṇ = 1166.66 metres = 1.167 kilometre

== Whole numbers ==
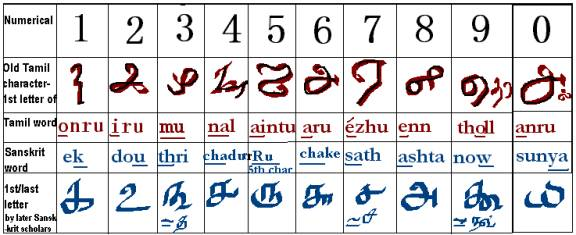
The following are the traditional numbers of the Ancient Tamil Country, Tamilakam.

Rank	10^{1}	10^{2}	10^{3}	10^{4}	10^{5}	10^{6}	10^{9}	10^{12}	10^{15}	10^{18}	10^{20}	10^{21}
Words	பத்து	நூறு	ஆயிரம்	பத்தாயிரம்	நூறாயிரம்	மெய்யிரம்	தொள்ளுண்	ஈகியம்	நெளை	இளஞ்சி	வெள்ளம்	ஆம்பல்
Character	௰	௱	௲	௰௲	௱௲	௲௲	௲௲௲	௲௲௲௲	௲௲௲௲௲	௲௲௲௲௲௲	௱௲௲௲௲௲௲	௲௲௲௲௲௲௲
Reading	pathu	nūru	āyiram	pattāyiram	nūraiyiram	meiyyiram	tollun	īkiyam	neļai	iļañci	veļļam	āmpal

Tamil texts also elaborate the following sanskritized version :

- 1 ONDRU = One = 10 ^{0}
- 10 = PATU = Ten = 10 ^{1}
- 100 = NŌRU = Hundred = 10 ^{2}
- 1,000 = ĀYIRAM = One Thousand = 10 ^{3}
- 10,000 = PATĀYIRAM = Ten Thousand = 10 ^{4}
- 1,00,000 = LATCHAM = Hundred Thousand = 10 ^{5}
- 10,00,000 = PATHU LATCHAM = One Million = 10 ^{6}
- 1,00,00,000 = KODI = Ten Million = 10 ^{7}
- 10,00,00,000 = PATHU KODI = Hundred Million = 10 ^{8}
- 1,00,00,00,000 = ARPUTAM = One Billion = 10 ^{9}
- 10,00,00,00,000 = PATU ARPUTAM = Ten Billion = 10 ^{10}
- 1,00,00,00,00,000 = NIGARPUTAM = Hundred Billion = 10 ^{11}
- 10,00,00,00,00,000 = PATU NIGARPUTAM = One Trillion = 10 ^{12}
- 1,00,00,00,00,00,000 = KUMBAM = Ten Trillion = 10 ^{13}
- 10,00,00,00,00,00,000 = PATU KUMBAM = Hundred Trillion = 10 ^{14}
- 1,00,00,00,00,00,00,000 = GANAM = One Quadrillion = 10 ^{15}
- 10,00,00,00,00,00,00,000 = PATHU GANAM = Ten Quadrillion = 10 ^{16}
- 1,00,00,00,00,00,00,00,000 = KARPAM = Hundred Quadrillion = 10 ^{17}
- 10,00,00,00,00,00,00,00,000 = PATU KARPAM = One Quintillion = 10 ^{18}
- 1,00,00,00,00,00,00,00,00,000 = NIKARPAM = Ten Quintillion = 10 ^{19}
- 10,00,00,00,00,00,00,00,00,000 = PATU NIKARPAM = Hundred Quintillion = 10 ^{20}
- 1,00,00,00,00,00,00,00,00,00,000 = PATUMAM = One Sextillion = 10 ^{21}
- 10,00,00,00,00,00,00,00,00,00,000 = PATU PATUMAM = Ten Sextillion = 10 ^{22}
- 1,00,00,00,00,00,00,00,00,00,00,000 = SANGGAM = Hundred Sextillion = 10 ^{23}
- 10,00,00,00,00,00,00,00,00,00,00,000 = PATU SANGGAM = One Septillion = 10 ^{24}
- 1,00,00,00,00,00,00,00,00,00,00,00,000 = VELLAM = Ten Septillion = 10 ^{25}
- 10,00,00,00,00,00,00,00,00,00,00,00,000 = PATU VELLAM = Hundred Septillion = 10 ^{26}
- 1,00,00,00,00,00,00,00,00,00,00,00,00,000 = ANNIYAM = One Octillion = 10 ^{27}
- 10,00,00,00,00,00,00,00,00,00,00,00,00,000 = PATU ANNIYAM = Ten Octillion = 10 ^{28}
- 1,00,00,00,00,00,00,00,00,00,00,00,00,00,000 = ARTTAM = Hundred Octillion = 10 ^{29}
- 10,00,00,00,00,00,00,00,00,00,00,00,00,00,000 = PATHU ARTTAM = One Nonillion = 10 ^{30}
- 1,00,00,00,00,00,00,00,00,00,00,00,00,00,00,000 = PARARTTAM = Ten Nonillion = 10 ^{31}
- 10,00,00,00,00,00,00,00,00,00,00,00,00,00,00,000 = PATU PARARTTAM = Hundred Nonillion = 10 ^{32}
- 1,00,00,00,00,00,00,00,00,00,00,00,00,00,00,00,000 = PŌRIYAM = One Decillion = 10 ^{33}
- 10,00,00,00,00,00,00,00,00,00,00,00,00,00,00,00,000 = PATU PŌRIYAM = Ten Decillion = 10 ^{34}
- 1,00,00,00,00,00,00,00,00,00,00,00,00,00,00,00,00,000 = MUKKODI = Hundred Decillion = 10 ^{35}
- 10,00,00,00,00,00,00,00,00,00,00,00,00,00,00,00,00,000 = PATU MUKKODI = One Undecillion = 10 ^{36}
- 1,00,00,00,00,00,00,00,00,00,00,00,00,00,00,00,00,00,000 = MAHAYUGAM = Ten Undecillion = 10 ^{37}

Malaysian text elaborates the following version

- 1 ONDRU = One = 10 ^{0}
- 10 = PATU = Ten = 10 ^{1}
- 100 = NŌRU = Hundred = 10 ^{2}
- 1,000 = ĀYIRAM = One Thousand = 10 ^{3}
- 10,000 = PATĀYIRAM = Ten Thousand = 10 ^{4}
- 100,000 = LATCHAM = Hundred Thousand = 10 ^{5}
- 1,000,000 = PATU LATCHAM = One Million = 10 ^{6}
- 10,000,000 = KODI = Ten Million = 10 ^{7}
- 100,000,000 = PATU KODI = Hundred Million = 10 ^{8}
- 1,000,000,000 = NŌRU KODI = One Billion = 10 ^{9}

== Fractions ==
- 1 – ஒன்று – onRu
- 3/4 = 0.75 – முக்கால் – mukkāl
- 1/2 = 0.5 – அரை – arai
- 1/4 = 0.25 – கால் – kāl
- 1/5 = 0.2 – நாலுமா – nālumā
- 3/16 = 0.1875 – மும்மாகாணி –mummākāṇi this is called as Mukkhani
- 3/20 = 0.15 – மும்மா – mummaa
- 1/8 = 0.125 – அரைக்கால் – araikkāl
- 1/10 = 0.1 – இருமா – irumā
- 1/16 = 0.0625 – மாகாணி (வீசம்) – mākāṇi (vīsam)
- 1/20 = 0.05 – ஒருமா – orumā
- 3/64 = 0.046875 – முக்கால்வீசம் – mukkāl vīsam
- 3/80 = 0.0375 – முக்காணி – mukkāṇi
- 1/32 = 0.03125 – அரைவீசம் – araivīsam
- 1/40 = 0.025 – அரைமா – araimā
- 1/64 = 0.015625 – கால் வீசம் – kaal vīsam
- 1/80 = 0.0125 – காணி – kāṇi
- 3/320 = 0.009375 – அரைக்காணி முந்திரி – araikkāṇi muntiri
- 1/160 = 0.00625 – அரைக்காணி – araikkāṇi
- 1/320 = 0.003125 – முந்திரி – muntiri
- 3/1280 = 0.00234375 – கீழ் முக்கால் – kīḻ mukkal
- 1/640 = 0.0015625 – கீழரை – kīḻarai
- 1/1280 = 7.8125e-04 – கீழ் கால் – kīḻ kāl
- 1/1600 = 0.000625 – கீழ் நாலுமா – kīḻ nalumā
- 3/5120 ≈ 5.85938e-04 – கீழ் மூன்று வீசம் – kīḻ mūndru vīsam
- 3/6400 = 4.6875e-04 – கீழ் மும்மா – kīḻ mummā
- 1/2500 = 0.0004 – கீழ் அரைக்கால் – kīḻ araikkāl
- 1/3200 = 3.12500e-04 – கீழ் இருமா – kīḻ irumā
- 1/5120 ≈ 1.95313e-04 – கீழ் வீசம் – kīḻ vīsam
- 1/6400 = 1.56250e-04 – கீழொருமா – kīḻ orumā
- 1/102400 ≈ 9.76563e-06 – கீழ்முந்திரி – kīḻ muntiri
- 1/2150400 ≈ 4.65030e-07 – இம்மி – immi
- 1/23654400 ≈ 4.22754e-08 – மும்மி – mummi
- 1/165580800 ≈ 6.03935e-09 – அணு – aṇu
- 1/1490227200 ≈ 6.71039e-10 – குணம் – kuṇam
- 1/7451136000 ≈ 1.34208e-10 – பந்தம் – pantam
- 1/44706816000 ≈ 2.23680e-11 – பாகம் – pāgam
- 1/312947712000 ≈ 3.19542e-12 – விந்தம் – vintam
- 1/5320111104000 ≈ 1.87966e-13 – நாகவிந்தம் – nāgavintam
- 1/74481555456000 ≈ 1.34261e-14 – சிந்தை – sintai
- 1/1489631109120000 ≈ 6.71307e-16 – கதிர்முனை –katirmunai
- 1/59585244364800000 ≈ 1.67827e-17 – குரல்வளைப்படி –kuralvaḷaippiḍi
- 1/3575114661888000000 ≈ 2.79711e-19 -வெள்ளம் – veḷḷam
- 1/357511466188800000000 ≈ 2.79711e-21 – நுண்மணல் –nuṇmaṇal
- 1/2323824530227200000000 ≈ 4.30325e-22 – தேர்த்துகள் –tērttugaḷ

== Currency ==
- 1 pal (wooden discs/sea shellots) = (approximately) 0.9 grain
- 8 (or 10 base 8) paṟkaḷ = 1 senkāṇi (copper/bronze) = 7.2 grains(misinterpretted by Roman accounts as 10 base 10 paRkal = 9 grains)
- 1/4 senkāṇi = 1 kālkāṇi (copper) = 1.8 grains (misinterpretted by Roman accounts as 2.25 grains)
- 64 (or 100 base 8) paṟkaḷ = 1 KaaNap-pon aka. Kāsu panam(gold) = 57.6 grains
- 1 Roman dinarium was traded on par with 2 Kāṇappon plus 1 Senkāṇi(=124 grains).
- 18 Ana = 2.85 Rupee, 16 Ana = 1 Rupee, 1 Ana = 3 Tuṭu, 1/4 Ana = 3/4 (mukkal) tuṭu

== Divisions of a Day ==
சிறுபொழுது (Daily)
1. மாலை (mālai): 6 pm-10 pm
2. இடையாமம் (iḍaiyāmam): 10 pm-2 am
3. வைகறை (vaikaṟai): 2 am-6 am
4. காலை (kālai): 6 am-10 am
5. நண்பகல் (naṇpagal): 10 am-2 pm
6. எற்பாடு (eṟpāḍu): 2 pm-6 pm

== Seasons ==
The Tamil year, in keeping with the old Indic calendar, is divided into six seasons, each of which lasts two months:

Season in Tamil	Transliteration	English Translation	Season in Sanskrit	Season in English	Tamil Months	Gregorian Months
இளவேனில்	Ila-venil	Light warmth	Vasanta	Spring	Chittirai, Vaikāsi	Mid Apr – Mid Jun
முதுவேனில்	Mudhu-venil	Harsh warmth	Grishma	Summer	Āni, Ādi	Mid Jun – Mid Aug
கார்	Kār	Dark clouds/Rain	Varsha	Monsoon	Āvaṇi, Puraṭṭāsi	Mid Aug – Mid Oct
குளிர்	Kulir	Chill/Cold	Sharada	Autumn	Aippasi, Kārtikai	Mid Oct – Mid Dec
முன்பனி	Mun-pani	Early mist/Dew	Hemanta	Winter	Mārgaḻi, Tai	Mid Dec – Mid Feb
பின்பனி	Pin-pani	Late mist/Dew	Sishira	Prevernal	Māsi, Panguni	Mid Feb – Mid Apr

== See also ==
- Tamil calendar

== Sources ==
- 3. https://tvaraj.com/2012/03/06/fractions-used-by-ancient-tamils/
- Tamil Measurements
