= Natyanjali =

Annual dance festival commemorating Hindu deity Shiva

Natyanjali is an annual dance festival commemorating Hindu deity Shiva. It originated around 1981, and started off as a relatively obscure event. It is currently organized by collaborative efforts of the Department of Tourism of Tamil Nadu and the Natyanjali Trust. Although celebrations are most prominent at its original venue, the 12th-century Chidambaram temple, they also occur in a wider spectrum across Tamil Nadu and Murugan temples. Mumbai also organize their own versions of the festival under the same banner. The current version lasts around 13 days, and various classical dance forms of all styles offer their art up to the god Nataraja. Senior gurus have been performing on Shivarathri night year after year.

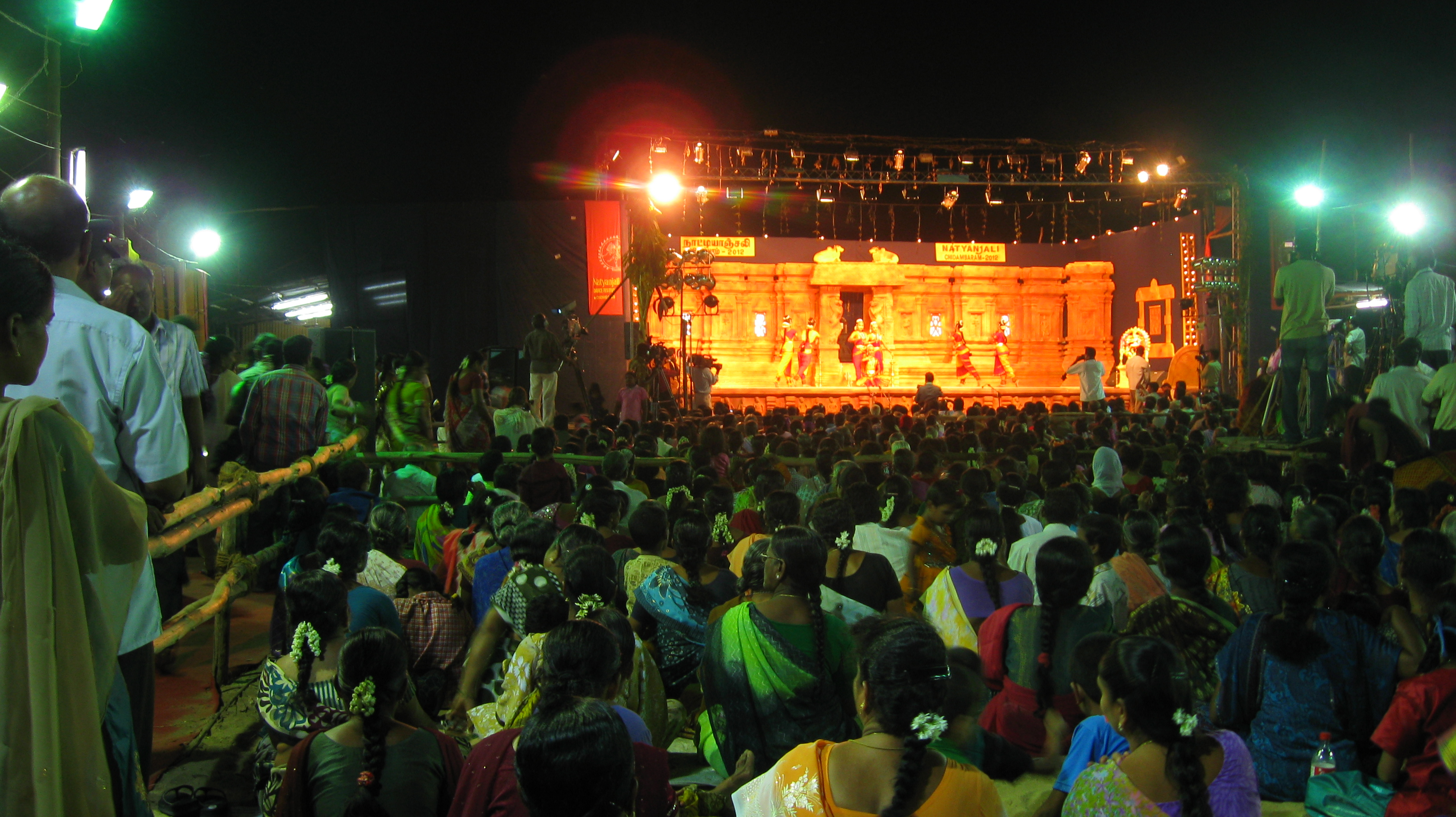
Natyanjali festival in Chidambaram
