= Aiyarappar Temple =

Shiva temple in Thanjavur district, Tamil Nadu, India

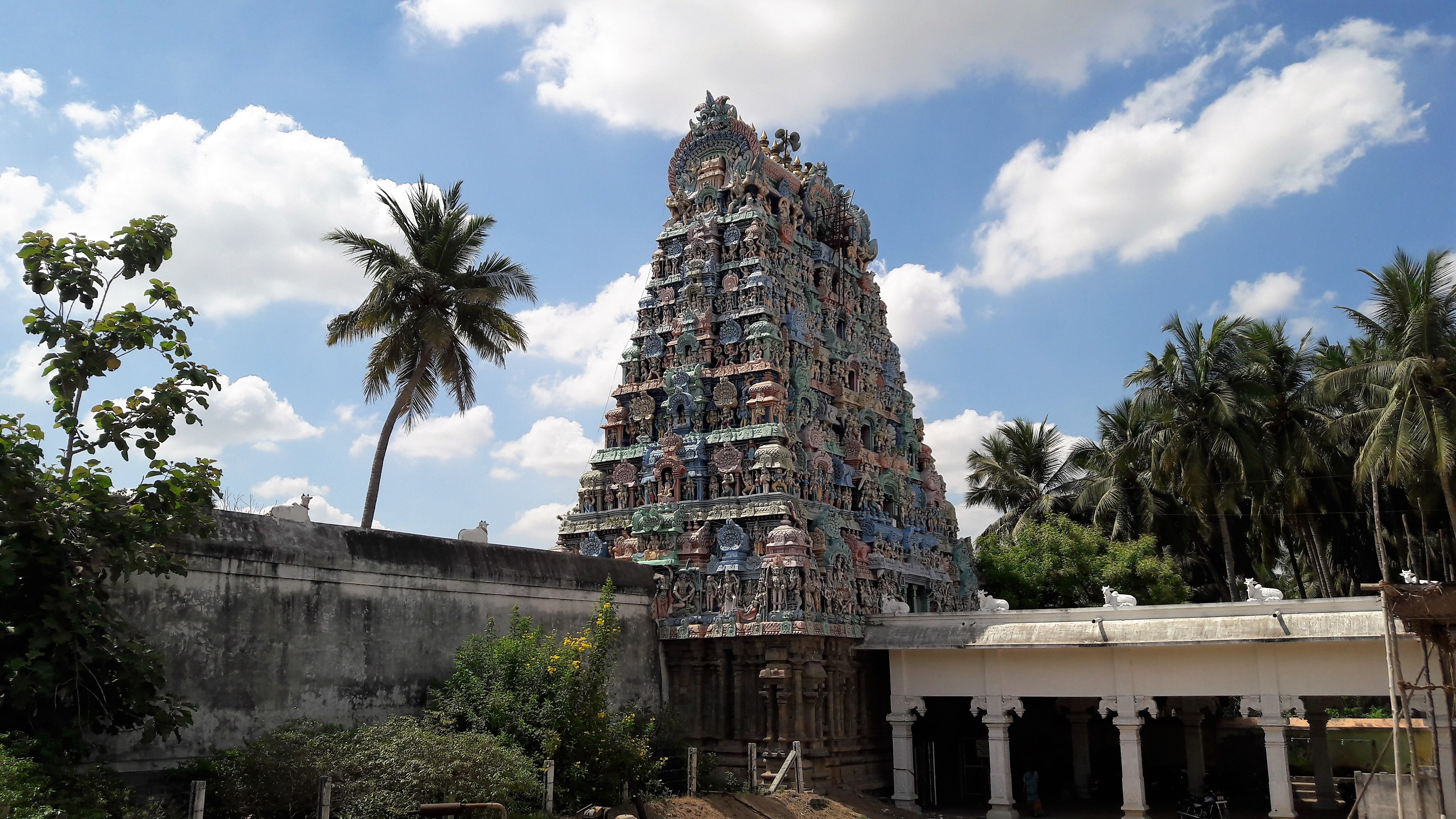

- Location in Tamil Nadu]

Religion
- Affiliation: Hinduism
- District: Thanjavur
- Deity: Aiyarappar (Shiva) AramValarthaNaayagi (Parvati)

Location
- Location: Tiruvaiyaru
- State: Tamil Nadu
- Country: India
- Coordinates: 10.88°N 79.1°E

Architecture
- Type: Tamilan architecture
- Creator: Cholas

Aiyarappar is a Hindu temple dedicated to Shiva located in the village of Tiruvaiyaru, Tamil Nadu, India. Shiva is worshiped as Aiyarappar, and is represented by the lingam and his consort Parvati is depicted as AramValarthaNaayagi. The presiding deity is revered in the 7th century CE Tamil Shaiva canonical work, the Tevaram, written by Tamil poet saints known as the nayanars and classified as Paadal Petra Sthalam.

This temple is known as Dakshina Kailasam (Kailasa of the South). This is the place where Nandi (the divine bull of lord Shiva) was born and became the mount for Shiva. The divine wedding of Nandi and Suyasayambikai was held at Thirumazhapadi Vaidyanathaswamy temple in Ariyalur district of Tamil Nadu. This is celebrated as Saptha Stanam festival which includes seven Shiva temples of the region.

There are many inscriptions associated with the temple indicating contributions from Cholas, Pandyas, Thanjavur Nayaks and Thanjavur Marathas. The oldest parts of the present masonry structure were built during the Chola dynasty in the 9th century, while later expansions, including the towering gopuram gatehouses, are attributed to later periods, up to the Thanjavur Nayaks during the 16th century.

The temple complex is one of the largest in the state and it houses four gateway towers known as gopurams. The temple has numerous shrines, with those of Aiyarappar and Dharmasamvardhini being the most prominent. The temple complex houses many halls and three precincts; the most notable is the second precinct built during the Vijayanagar period that has many sculptures. The temple is now maintained and administered by Hindu Religious and Charitable Endowments Department of the Government of Tamil Nadu, Before 1984 it was maintained by philanthropic personalities.

== Legend ==
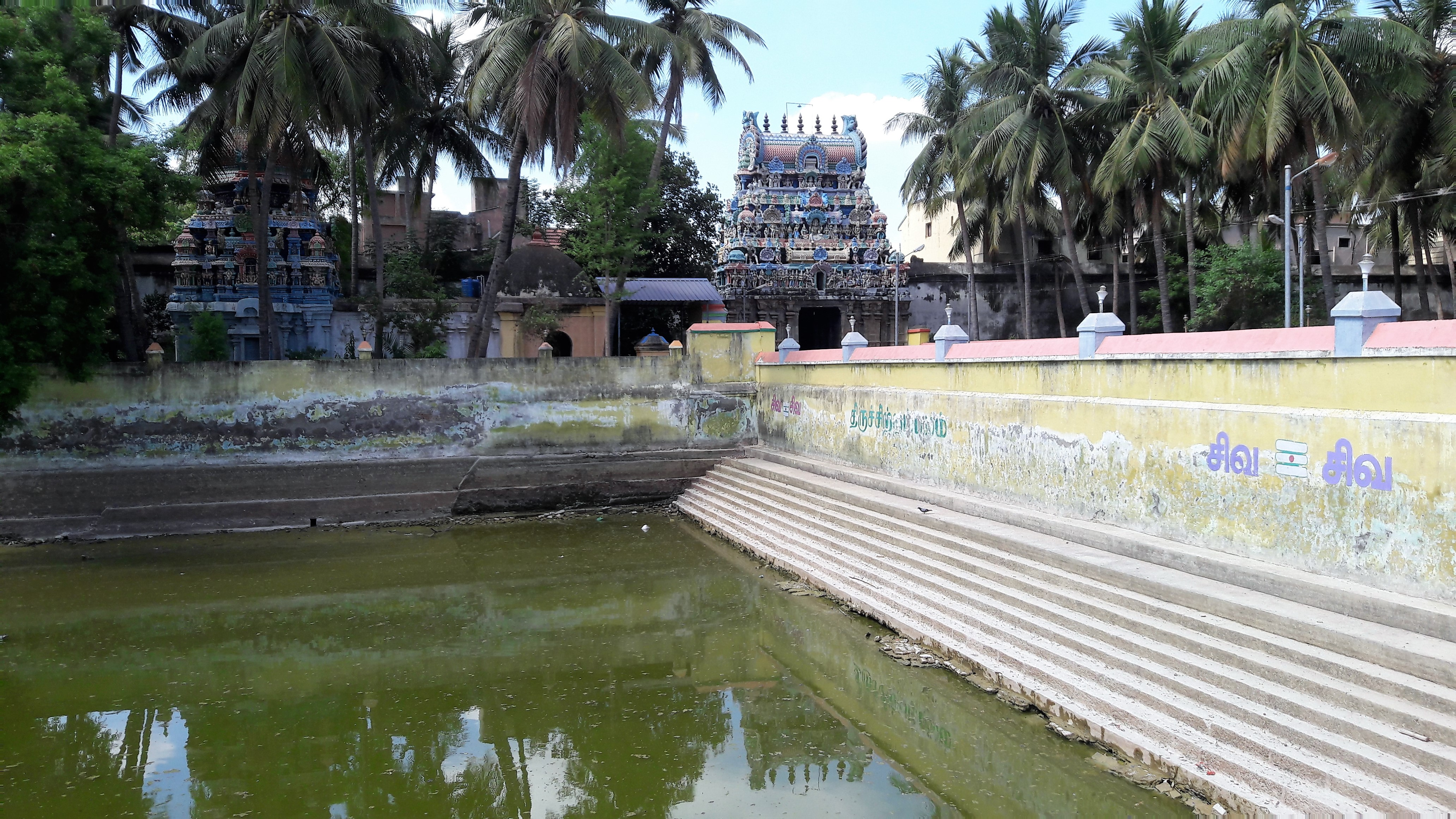
Image of temple tank

The presiding deity is named Aiyarappar or Panchanadeeswarar as the place has five rivers. In Tamil, ai means five, aru means river signifying the name. The Five Rivers are Vadavaru, Vennaaru, Vettaaru, Kudamuruttiyaaru and Kaaviriyaaru. As per Hindu legend, once a devout devotee of Shiva who was also the priest in the temple could not return to the temple on time as he was out to Kashi on a pilgrimage. On account of the delay, the priest prayed to Shiva for his inability to perform the days worship practices. When he returned the next day to the temple, people were astonished as they realized that Shiva descended in the form of the priest the previous day. It is place where Appar, the famous Saivite saint is believed to have obtained the vision of Kailasa. Sundarar came to Thirukkandiyur in the opposite bank of river Cauvery to worship at Kandeeswarar Temple. He could not cross the river on account of floods and he prayed to Shiva. It is believed that on account of his worship, the river paved the way onto the temple. The temple is mentioned as Loga Mahadevi Iswaram based on the inscriptions recorded from ARE 219 & 222 of 1894.

As per another legend, Nandi(the divine bull of lord Shiva), the founder of Tirukailaya monastic dynasty, was born at this place to sage Salandha. The sage left the child in the temple. It is believed that Shiva performed ablution with Ambika's breast milk on the child, foam from Nandhi's mouth, nectar from Surya Pushakarni, Amrita pushkarani and Saiva theertham (the three water bodies). Since the child received from five different water sources, the presiding deity came to be known as Aiyarappar. The temple is counted as one of the temples built on the northern banks of River Kaveri.

== Location ==
The temple is located in Tiruvaiyaru, a panchayat town in Thanjavur district in the Indian state of Tamil Nadu. It is situated on the banks of the river Kaveri, 13 km from Thanjavur, Thiruvaiyaru has an old Shiva temple dedicated to Panchanatheeswar.

== Architecture ==
The temple, known as Dakshina Kailasam (Southern abode of Shiva), built in an area of approximately 60000 square meters, has five prakarams (closed precincts of a temple) and many mandapams (halls). The temple faces east and is entered via a seven-tiered pyramidal rajagopuram (gateway tower). The presiding deity in the form of lingam is housed in the sanctum in square shape measuring 3.35 m (11.0 ft) from inside and 5.97 m (19.6 ft) from outside. The attached hall, the ardhamandapa measures the same width as the sanctum 3.35 m (11.0 ft), while its length is twice the sanctum, 6.7 m (22 ft). The ardhamandapa projects 7.16 m (23.5 ft) towards the east. The Mukhamandapa has a square structure measuring 5.94 m (19.5 ft). There are five devakoshtas that cover the exterior walls of the sanctum. The images of Dakshinamurthy and Brahma are the only ones remaining out of the five. There are two large Dvarapala, guardian deities on either side of the entrance of the ardhamandapa.

The temple has also a shrine for Aatkondar or Kalasamharamoorthy. A Homa Kund started by saint Adi Sankara can be found outside the shrine of Aatkonda. While the presiding deity of temple is named after the five rivers, there are five water bodies in the temple namely Surya Pushkarani, Ganga Theertham, Chandra Pushkarani, Palaru and Nandi Theertham. There are two shrines named Dakshina Kailasam and Uttara Kailasam. There is a Mukthi mandapam where Panchaksara japam is performed.

== History ==
Several inscriptions in the temple affiliates the temple to the Cholas, Pandyas, and other rulers. Karikala Chola, Rajaraja, Jatavarman Sundara Pandyan, and Krishna Devarayar are associated with Thiruvaiyaru. The temple has two distinct divisions called Uttarakailasam and Dakshinakailasam. Uttarakailasam was built by Rajaraja Cholan's queen in the late 10th century who also made several endowments. Dakshinakailasam was renovated by Rajendra Cholan's queen. Appar, one of the important Nayanmar, was closely associated with this shrine and dedicated one of the songs in Thevaram to this temple. There is an inscription (ARE 219 of 1894) dated to the 21st regnal year of Rajaraja I on the South wall of the temple indicating sale of land. Another inscription recorded during the 22nd year indicating a gift of 96 sheep for the perpetual lighting of the temple. An inscription during the 24th year of the king indicate various types of jewelry gifted to the presiding and processional deities. An inscription (ARE 215 of 1894) on the east wall of the mandapa indicated gift of eight pots of silver by Vimaladitta, the son-in-law of Rajaraja. A record of gift of land during fourth regnal year of Rajendra I is found in ARE 216 of 1894. The other major inscription during the thirty second year of Rajadhiraja I indicates the victories of the ruler against three Pandya rulers namely Manabharan, Vira Pandya and Sundara Pandya.

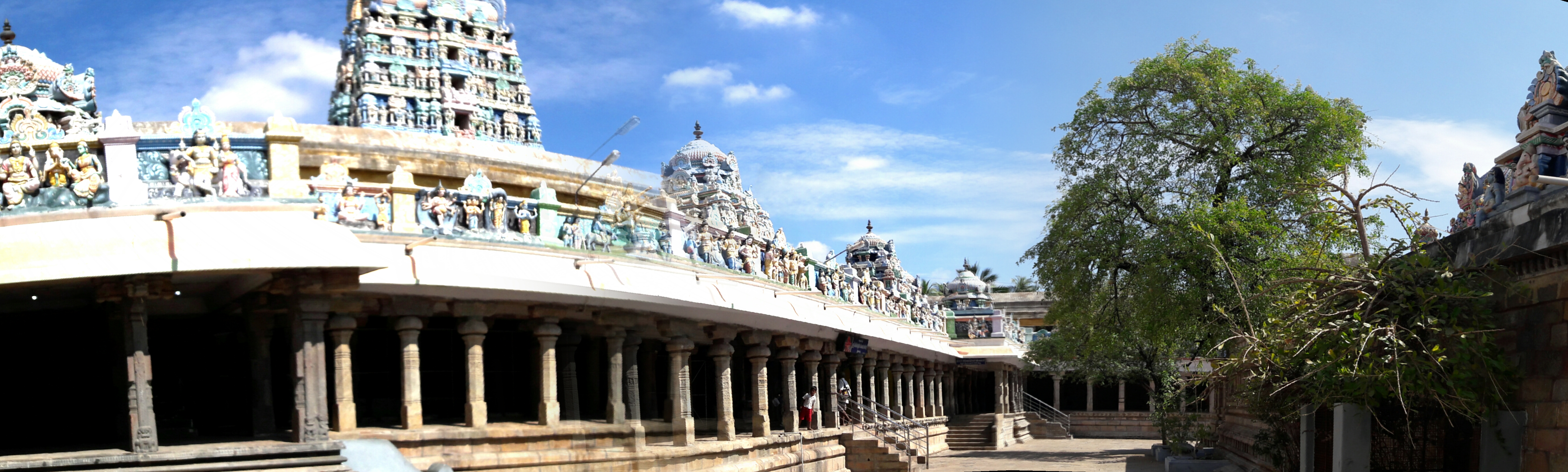
Panoramic view of the temple

== Saptha Stanam ==
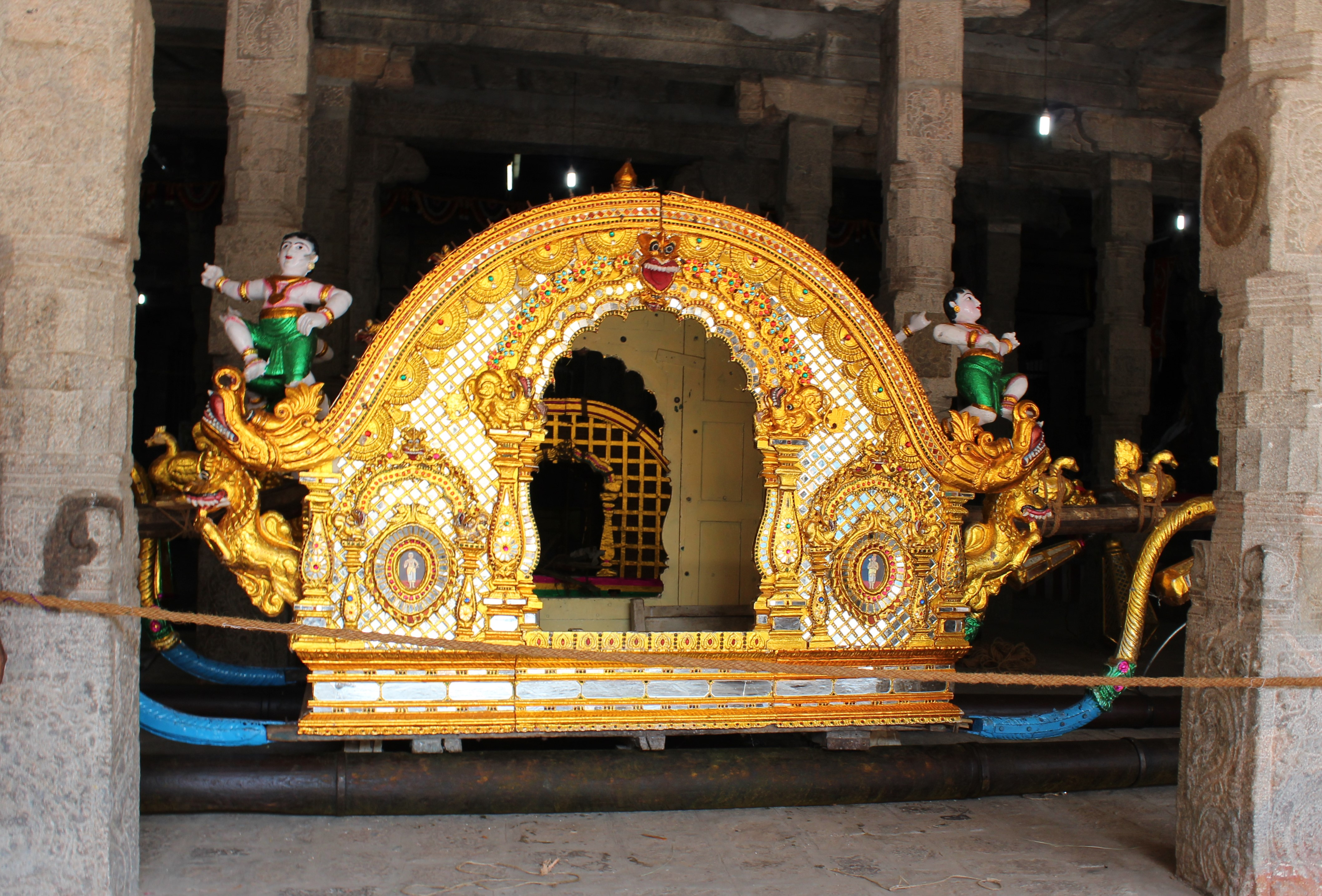
The decorated palanquin used during the festival

Om symbol Sapthastanam Om symbol
The seven important temples in and around Thiruvaiyaru
Temple	Location
Aiyarappar temple	Thiruvaiyaru
Apathsahayar Temple	Thirupazhanam
Odhanavaneswarar Temple	Tiruchotruturai
Vedapuriswarar Temple	Thiruvedhikudi
Kandeeswarar Temple	Thirukkandiyur
Puvananathar Temple	Thirupanturuthi
Neyyadiappar Temple	Tillaistanam

The divine bull Nandi was born in this temple and became the mount of lord Shiva.The divine wedding of Nandi and Suyasayambikai was held at Thirumazhapadi Vaidyanathaswamy temple in Ariyalur district of Tamil Nadu. This is celebrated as Saptha Stanam festival which includes seven Shiva temples of the region. The sapthasthanam festival is conducted at Tiruvaiyaru during April every year. As per Hindu legend, it is the wedding festival of Nandikeswara, the sacred bull of Shiva on the Punarpoosa star during the Tamil month of Panguni. The festival deity of Aiyarappar temple of Thiruvaiyaru is carried in a decorated glass palanquin along with the images of Nandikeswara and Suyasayambikai to the temples in Thirupazhanam, Thiruchottruthurai, Thiruvedhikudi, Thirukandiyur and Thirupoonthurthi. Each of the festival deities of the respective temples mounted in glass palanquins accompany Aiyarppar on the way to the final destiny, Thillaistanam. There is a grand display of fireworks in Cauvery riverbed outside Thillaistanam temple. The seven palanquins are carried to Aiyarappar temple in Thiruvaiyyaru. Hundreds of people witness the convergence of seven glass palanquins carrying principal deities of respective temples from seven places at Tiruvaiyaru. The devotees perform Poochorithal (flower festival) in which a doll offers flowers to the principal deities in the palanquins. After the Poochorithal, the palanquins leave for their respective temples.

== Religious importance ==
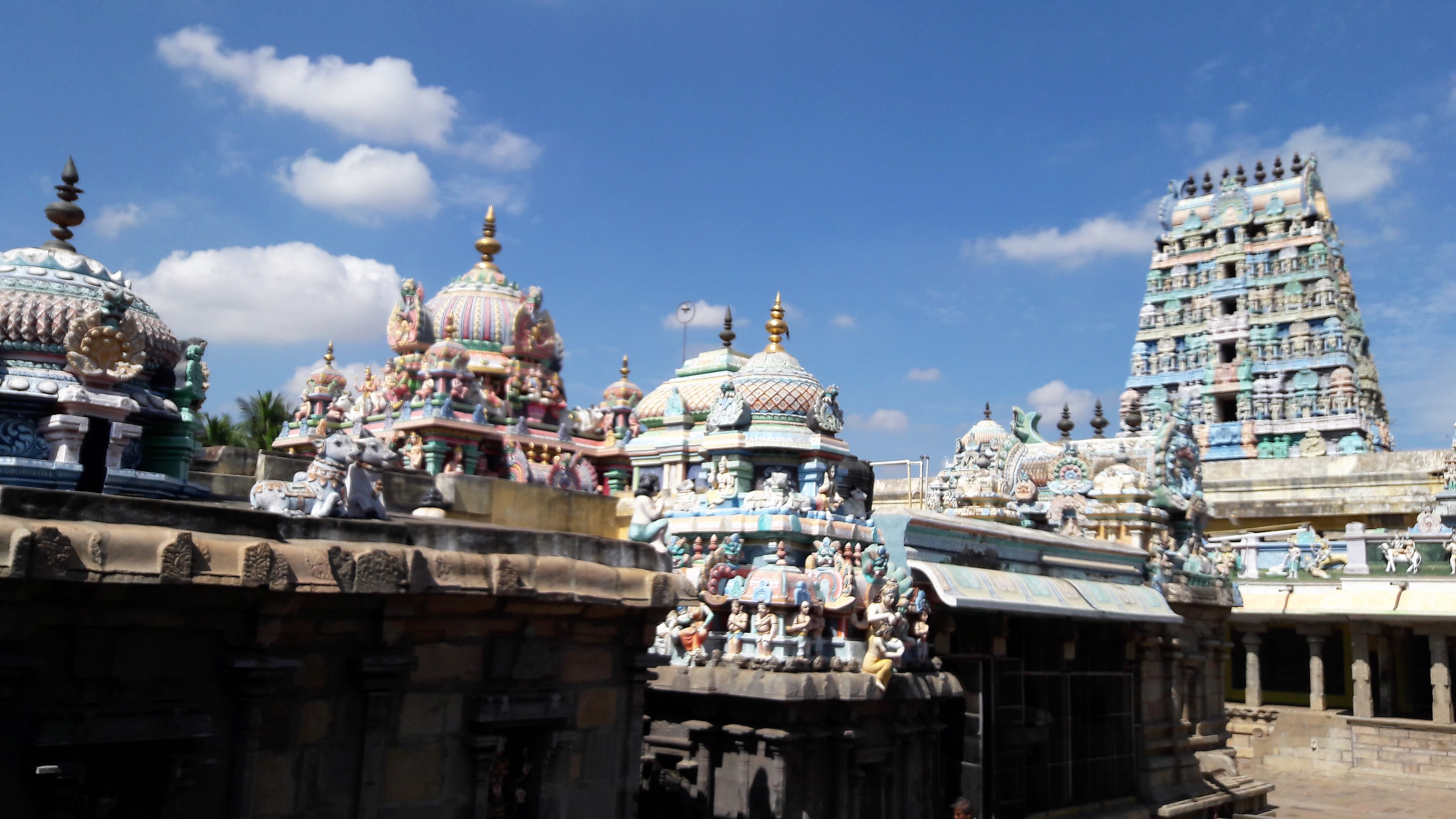
Shrines within the temple

Thiruvayyaru, Mayiladuthurai, Thiruvidaimaruthur, Thiruvenkadu, Chayavanam and Srivanchiyam are considered equivalents of Kasi. Like in Kasi, where the city is centered around Kashi Vishwanath Temple, the temples in these towns along the banks of river Cauvery, namely Aiyarappar Koil in Thiruvaiyaru, Mahalingeswarar temple in Thiruvidaimarudur, Mayuranathaswamy temple in Mayiladuthurai, Chayavaneswarar temple in Sayavanam, Swetharanyeswarar temple in Thiruvenkadu, Srivanchinadhaswamy Koil in Srivanchiyam are the centerpieces of the towns.

Tirugnana Sambandar, a 7th-century Tamil Saivite poet, venerated Aiyarappar in ten padigams in Tevaram, compiled as the First Tirumurai and second Tirumuari. Appar, a contemporary of Sambandar, also venerated Aiyarappar in 12 padigams in Tevaram, compiled in the Fourth, fifth and sixth Tirumurai. Sundarar, the 8th century Nayanmar revered Aiyarppar in seven padigams, which is compiled in Seventh Tirumuari. As the temple is revered in Tevaram, it is classified as Paadal Petra Sthalam, one of the 275 temples that find mention in the Saiva canon. The temple is counted as the 52nd in the list of temples in the northern banks of Cauvery.
