= Swetharanyeswarar Temple =

Navagraha temple in Tamil Nadu

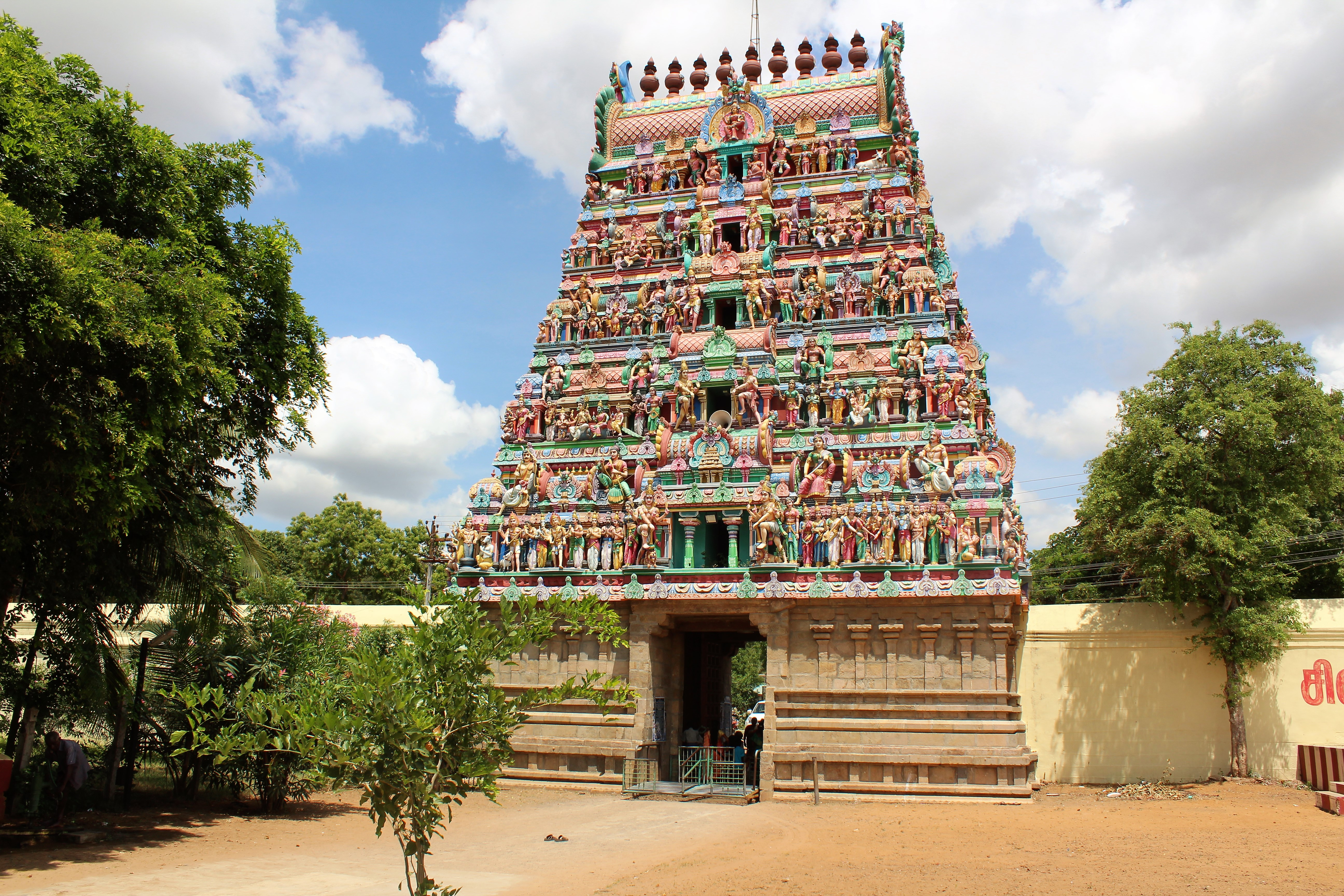

- Location in Tamil Nadu

Religion
- Affiliation: Hinduism
- District: Mayiladuthurai
- Deity: Swetharanyar (Shiva), Brahma Vidya (Parvathi)
- Festival: Tamil Masi Month 10 days

Location
- Location: Thiruvenkadu, Tamil Nadu, India
- State: Tamil Nadu
- Country: India
- Coordinates: 11°10′31″N 79°48′34″E

Architecture
- Type: Dravidian
- Completed: 1000-2000 years old

Swetharanyeswarar Temple is a Hindu temple dedicated to the deity Shiva, located in Thiruvenkadu, a village in Mayiladuthurai district in the South Indian state of Tamil Nadu. Shiva is worshiped as Swetharanyeswarar, and is represented by the lingam. His consort Parvati is depicted as Brahmavidyambigai. The presiding deity is revered in the 7th-century-CE Tamil Saiva canonical work, the Tevaram, written by Tamil saint poets known as the Nayanars and classified as Paadal Petra Sthalam. It is significant to the Hindu sect of Saivism as one of the temples associated with the nine planet elements, the Navagraha Stalas, and specifically Budha.

The temple complex covers around two acres and entered through a seven-tiered gopuram, the main gateway. The temple has a number of shrines, with those of Swetharanyesarar, Aghora and that of Nataraja, being the most prominent. All the shrines and the three temple tanks of the temple are enclosed in large concentric rectangular granite walls.

The temple has six daily rituals at various times from 6:00 a.m. to 8:00 p.m., and four yearly festivals on its calendar. Chitra Pournami and Aani Thirumanjanam during the Tamil month of Aaani (June–July) are the most prominent festivals celebrated in the temple.

The original complex is believed to have been built by Cholas, while the present masonry structure was built by Vijayanagar kings during the 16th century. In modern times, the temple is maintained and administered by the Hindu Religious and Charitable Endowments Department of the Government of Tamil Nadu.

== Legend ==
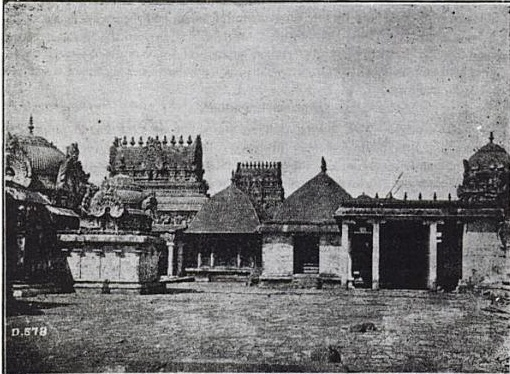
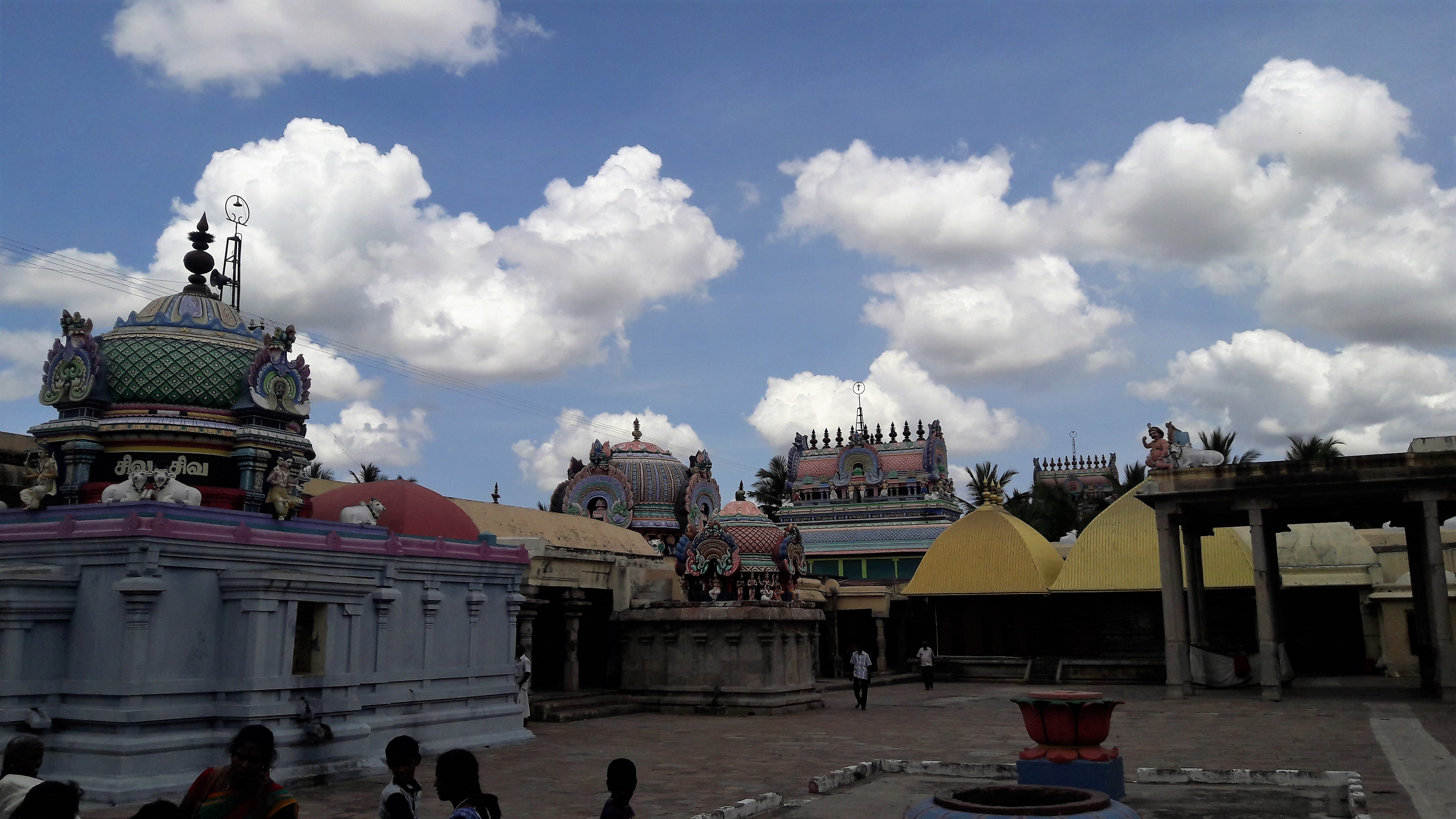
An old and new image of the shrines within the temple

Swetharanyeswarar is the main Hindu god in this temple. It is said that Agora Murthi was one of the furious incarnation of Shiva. There was a demon named Maruthuvasuran in Thiruvengadu. He performed penance to please Brahma for attaining special powers. Pleased by his devotion, Brahma offered him special powers. Maruthuvasuran started misusing his powers to torture the saints and innocent people. All the suffering saints and people requested Shiva to put an end to their hardship. Shiva took an incarnation as Agoramurthi and killed Maruthuvasuran under a tree which is believed to be the place where Thiruvengadu temple is located. The place is called by other names like Swetaranyam, Adi Chidambaram and Nava Ntirya Stala. Indra, Airavata, Budhan, Surya and Chandra are said to have worshipped Swetharanyeswarar here.

As per Hindu legend, Achyutha Kalappalar, a local chieftain was childless. His guru Sivacharya analyzed his horoscope and read out an ancient palm leaf manuscript. It had the verse of Sambandar, one of the major Saivite saints Nayanars. Chieftain was advised to pray at Venkadu to be blessed with a progeny. He prayed at the place along with his wife and was blessed with a boy. The boy, Meykandadevar, later went on to write Sivagnana Bodham.

As per some Hindu legend, Budhan, was the child of Chandra and Tara. Tara was originally the wife of Brihaspati, but had an illicit relationship with Chandra. Tara was directed by Shiva and Brahma to go back to her husband Guru and she entrusted the child to Chandra. Budhan grew up to learn his background and started hating his parents. He did severe penance praying Shiva. Pleased by his devotion, Shiva blessed him to be a Navagraha. Brahma was blessed with divine power of learning (Vidya) by Parvathi in the temple. Pillai Idikki Amman, an idol depicted hold a child on her hip is believed to be the depiction of Parvathi holding the child Sambandar when the latter called her Amma.

== History ==
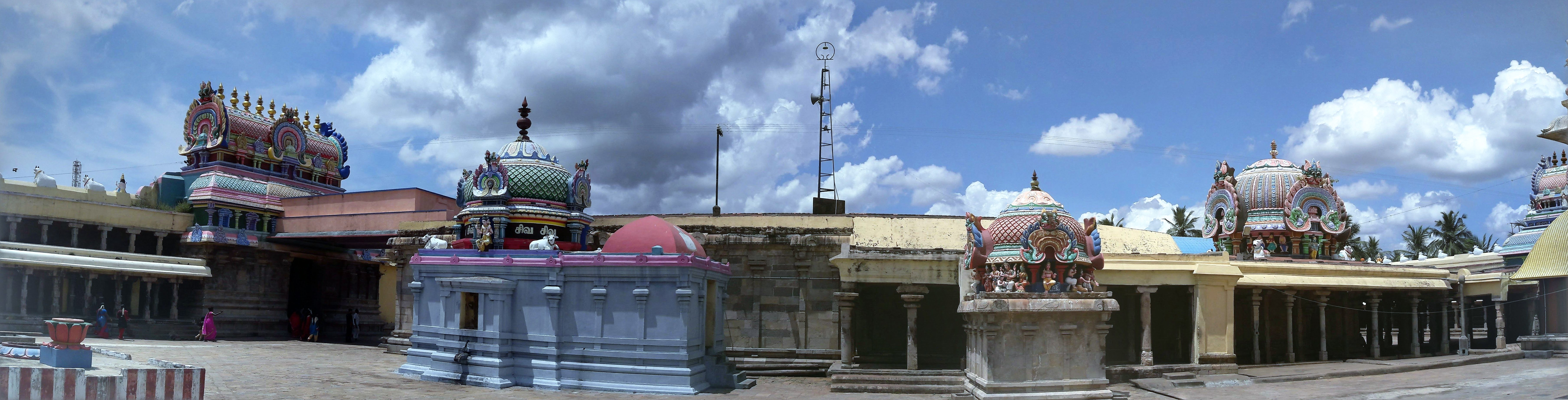
Panoramic view of the temple

From the stone inscriptions found inside this temple, it can be seen that the earlier Chola kings Aditya Chola and Rajaraja Chola made a lot of contributions to this temple. There are several shrines of significance in this well visited temple, including those to Durga and Kali. The image of Natarajar here is of great beauty. Worship to Aghoramurthy (Veerabhadrar) is said to be of significance on Sunday nights in this temple. As found in Chidambaram, there is also a shrine for Vishnu near the shrine for Natarajar. This temple is known as Adi Chidambaram because before Shiva first danced here before dancing in Chidambaram. The temple has around hundred stone inscriptions from various dynasties from Cholas, Pandyas and Vijayanagara Empire king Krishnadevaraya. The major kings who are believed to have bestowed endowments in the temple are that of Raja Raja Chola I (985 - 1014), Rajendra I (1012–1044), Virarajendra (1063–1070), Kulothunga I (1070-1120), Kulesekara Pandya and Vikrama Pandya.

== Architecture ==
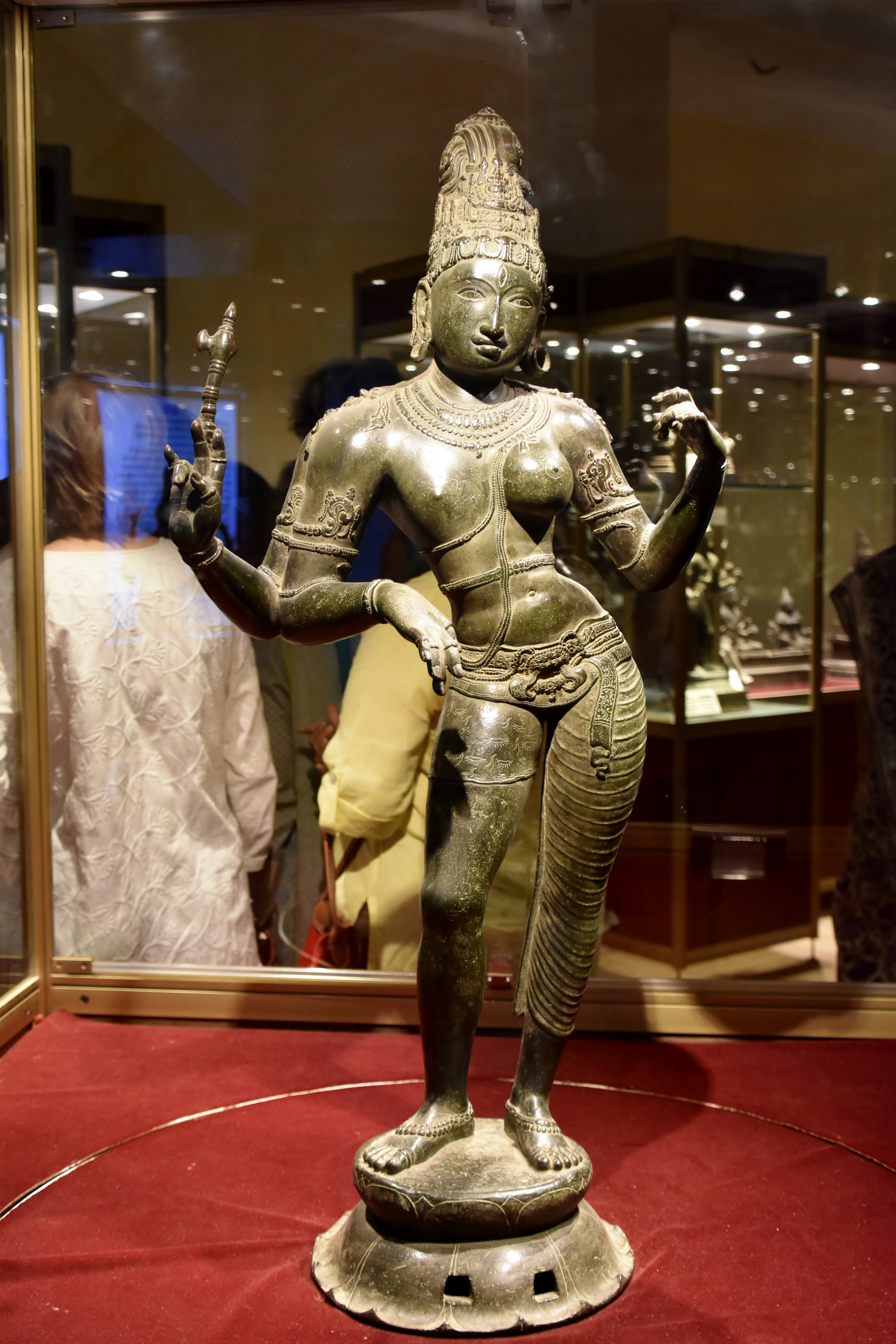

Swetharanyeswarar temple is located in Thiruvenkadu, a village in the Sirkazhi - Poompuhar road, located 95 km (59 mi) from Thanjavur. The temple occupies an area of 2 acres (0.81 ha) with all its shrines and water bodies housed inside granite walls. The temple has two entrances on eastern and western directions and are adorned by seven-tiered gopurams. There are many shrines inside the temple. The temple has three presiding deities namely Swetharanya, Aghora and Nataraja who are believed to govern Budha. The temple has three water bodies namely Surya, Chandra and Agni. The shrine of Budha is located in the third precinct opposite to one of the temple tanks. Budha (Mercury) is believed to signify a person's speaking skills.

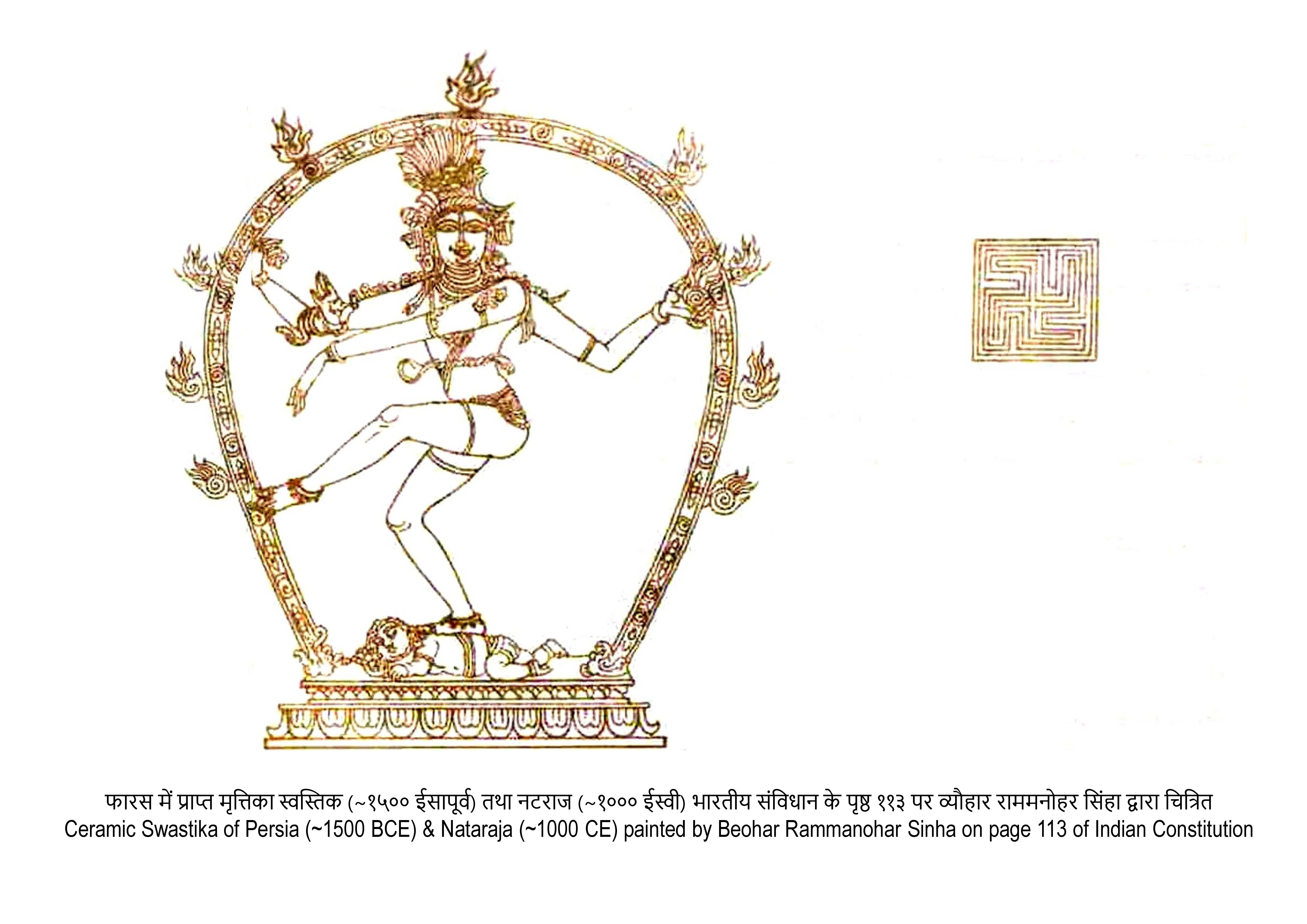
The Thiruvengadu Nataraja image as illustrated on page 113 of original manuscript of Indian Constitution by artist Rammanohar

A Chola bronze of Ardhanarishvara with a height of 102 cm (40 in) in standing posture dated to about 11th century was found in the village in Nagapattinam district. The right half has the representation of Siva, while the left half has Parvati. The right half of Shiva is sported with two arms, with one of them sporting an axe. The side of Parvathi has elaborate decorations with jewels and her drapery extends up to the knee portion. The mention about the image installed by Rajendra Chola I is found in Thiruvalangadu plates. Another image of Parvathi sported with her attendant and with a height of 90 cm (35 in) from the Chola period, is considered a masterpiece of Chola art. The right hand of Parvathi holds a flower port, while her left hand rests on the head of the attendant. A bronze image of Chandikeswara in seated posture with his folded left leg. The bronze images are stored in the Bronze gallery in Government Museum, Chennai. As per historians, the image of Agoramurthi is believed to be a powerful image.

== Festivals ==
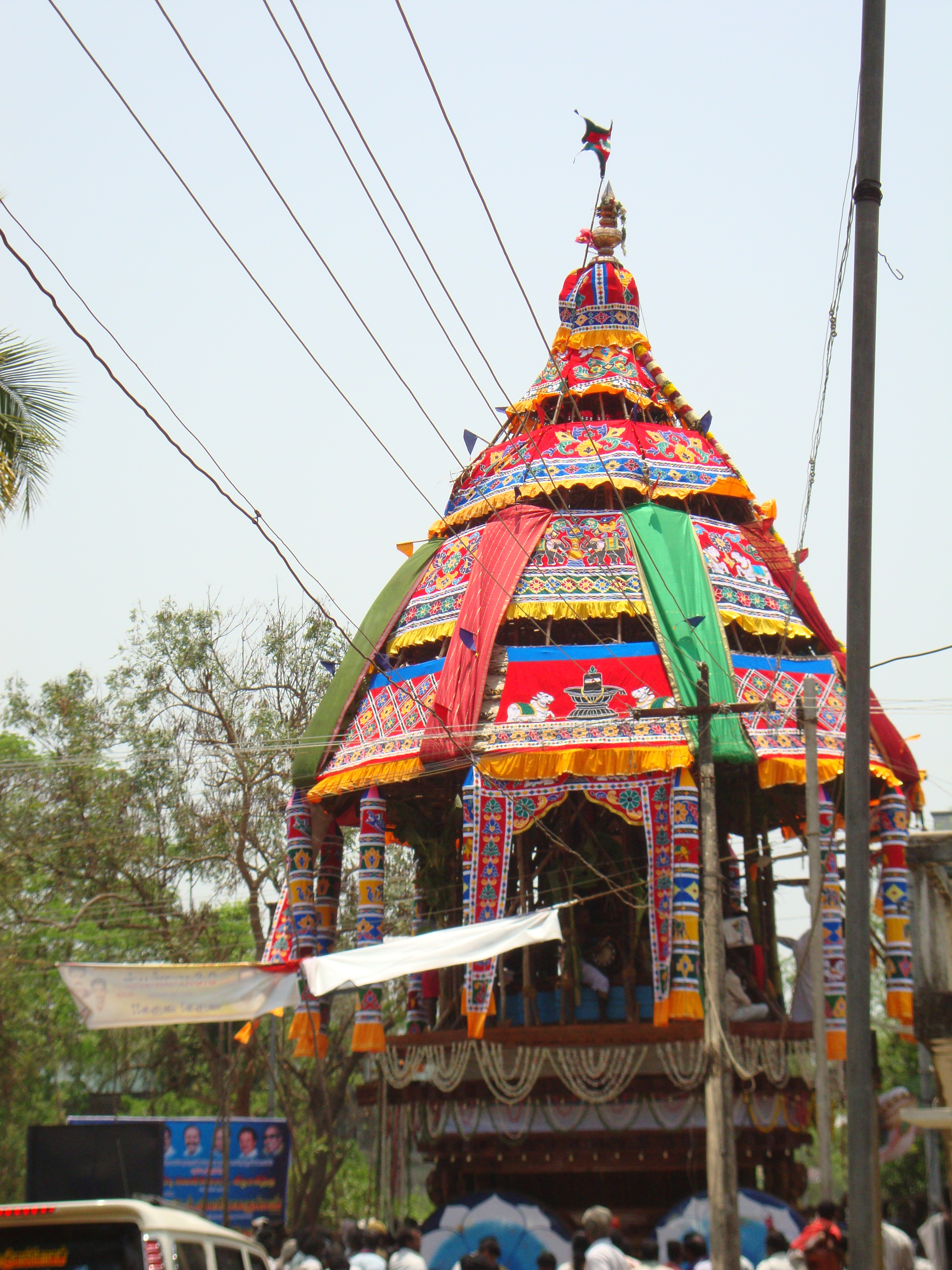
Chariot festival at Thiruvengadu

The temple follows Saivite tradition. The temple priests perform the pooja (rituals) during festivals and on a daily basis. As at other Shiva temples of Tamil Nadu, the priests belong to the Shaivaite community, a Brahmin sub-caste. The temple rituals are performed six times a day: Kalasanthi at 8:30 a.m., rendamkalam at 10:30 a.m., Uchikalam at 12:30 p.m., Sandi at 6:00 p.m., and Sayarakshai between 8:00 p.m. - 8:00 p.m. Each ritual has three steps: alangaram (decoration), neivethanam (food offering) and deepa aradanai (waving of lamps) for both Swetharanyeswarar and Brahmavidyambigai. There are weekly, monthly and fortnightly rituals performed in the temple. The temple is open from 6am - 12 pm and 4-8:30 pm.

Vaikasi Visagam celebrated during the Tamil month of Vaikasi (May - June), Aaadi Mulaikattu festival celebrated during the Tamil month of Aadi (August - September), Navaratri during the Tamil month of Purattasi (September - October) and Aipasi Kolattam festival during the Tamil month of Aipasi (October - November)are the most prominent festivals celebrated in the temple. There are other common festivals like Shivaratri, Vinayaga Chaturthi, Vijayadasami and Karthigai Deepam celebrated in the temple. There are many festivals which are being celebrated in this village. It includes the chariot festival which is celebrated every year in the month of February. This Chariot festival is celebrated for 10 days. On 5th day a special occasion is celebrated for Agora Murthi. People from many surrounding villages would come here and pray here for their better life.

== Religious importance ==
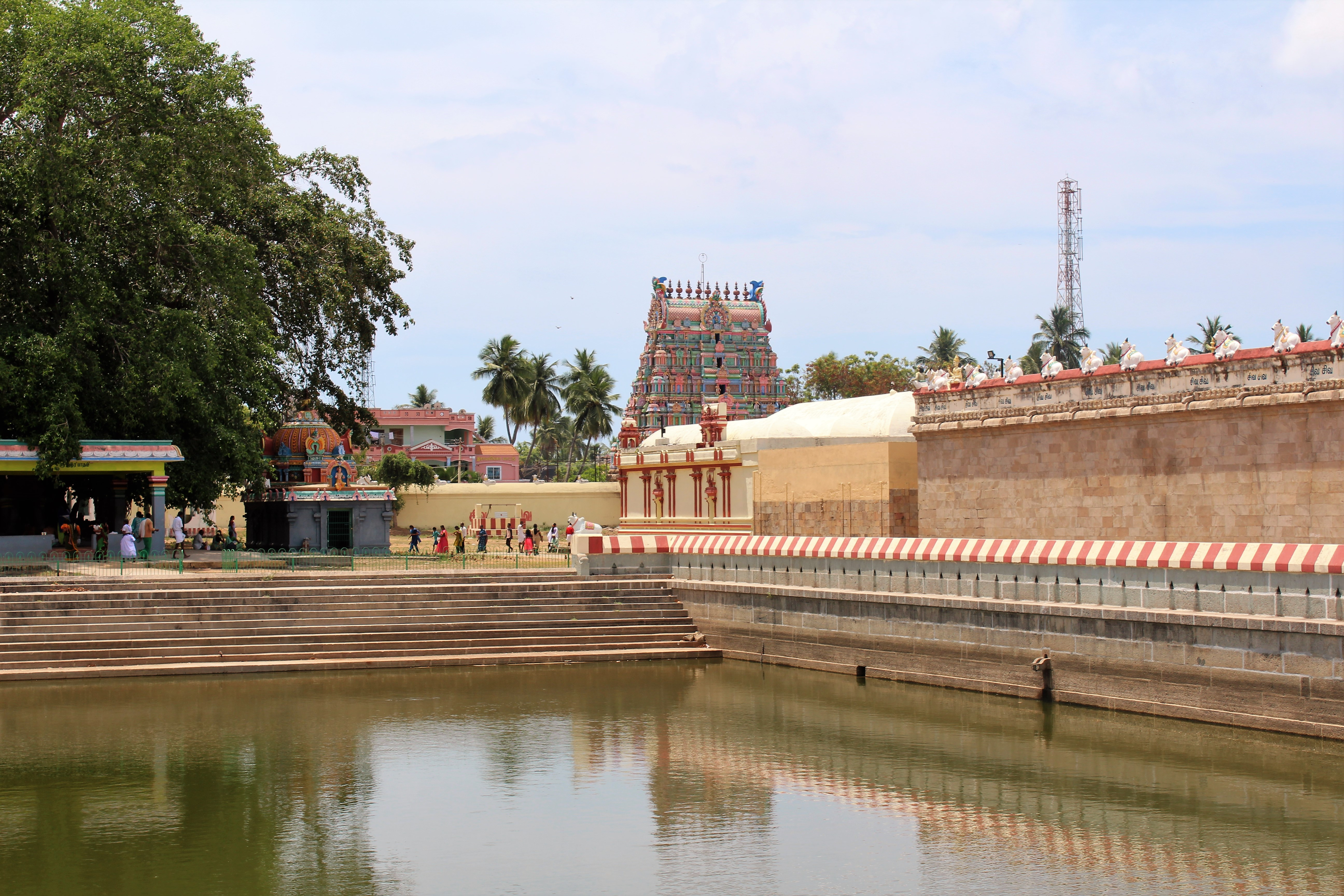
Image of the temple tank

The temple is one of the nine Navagraha temples of Tamil Nadu and is a part of the popular Navagraha pilgrimage in the state - it houses the image of Budha (Mercury). The planets are believed to influence the horoscope computed based on time of one's birth and subsequently influence the course of life. Each of the planets are believed to move from a star to another during a predefined period and thus sway over an individual's fortunes. The Navagrahas, as per Hindu customs, are believed to provide both good and bad effects for any individual and the bad effects are mitigated by prayers. As in other Navagraha temples, the common worship practises of the devotees include offering of cloth, grains, flowers and jewels specific to the planet deity. Lighting a set of lamps is also commonly followed in the temple. As per contemporary Saivite belief, the energies distributed cyclically by Navagrahas can be channeled based on remedial measures. As per local legends, Shiva, the overlord of the nine planetary deities, allowed them to freely grant wishes based on devotion of the devotees.

Thiruvayyaru, Mayiladuthurai, Thiruvidaimaruthur, Thiruvenkadu, Chayavanam and Srivanchiyam are considered equivalents of Kasi. Like in Kasi, where the city is centered around Kashi Vishwanath Temple, the temples in these towns along the banks of river Cauvery, namely Aiyarappar temple in Thiruvaiyaru, Mahalingeswarar temple in Thiruvidaimarudur, Mayuranathaswamy temple in Mayiladuthurai, Chayavaneswarar temple in Sayavanam, Swetharanyeswarar temple in Thiruvenkadu, Srivanchinadhaswamy Koil in Srivanchiyam are the centerpieces of the towns.
