= Vanchinadha Swamy Temple =

Shiva temple in Tamil Nadu, India

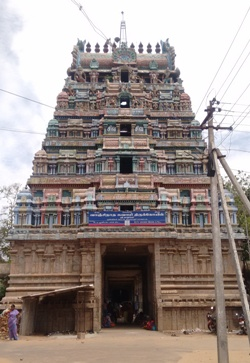

- Location in Tamil Nadu

Religion
- Affiliation: Hinduism
- Deity: Vanchinadha Swamy (Shiva); Mangalambigai (Parvathi)

Location
- Location: Srivanchiyam
- State: Tamil Nadu
- Country: India
- Coordinates: 10.872338°N 79.573023°E

Architecture
- Type: Dravidian architecture

Vanchinadha Swamy temple is a Hindu temple to the deity Shiva in Srivanchiyam, Tiruvarur District, Tamil Nadu, India. Shiva is worshiped as Vanchinadha Swamy, and is represented by the lingam. His consort Parvati is depicted as Mangalambigai Amman. The presiding deity is mentioned in the 7th century Tamil Saiva canonical work, the Tevaram, and is classified as Paadal Petra Sthalam.

The temple complex covers an area of 2 acres (0.81 ha) and houses two gateway towers known as gopurams. The tallest is the eastern tower, with 11 stories and a height of 108 feet (33 m).

The masonry structure was built during the Chola dynasty in the 11th century, while later expansions are attributed to Vijayanagar rulers of the Thanjavur Nayaks of the 16th century. The temple is maintained and administered by the Hindu Religious and Charitable Endowments Department of the Government of Tamil Nadu.

== Legend ==
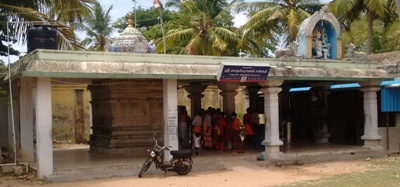
Shrine of Yama

As per Hindu legend, once Lakshmi, the consort of Vishnu had a fight with him and left their abode, Vaikunta. She came to earth and Vishnu followed in search of her. He found a Linga (an iconic form of Shiva) in a Sandalwood forest and started worshipping Shiva. Shiva was pleased with the devotion and he restored Lakshmi to Vishnu. Since Vishnu helped Lakshmi, locally called "Sri", the place came to be known as Srivanchiyam.This story is not mentioned in puranas. As per another legend, a sage named Sarva was performing penance on the banks of river Sarayu. A divine voice told him that the Dharma would get destroyed during Kaliyuga. The sage was running towards the temple shouting "Shivaya Namaha, Thiruvanjiyam Abayam". Kali, another form of Yama was running behind the sage. He was stopped by Shiva on the border of the village. Shiva appeared as Vanchinathar to ward off the threat of Yama, who is stationed in a shrine outside the first precinct following the legend.

== Architecture ==
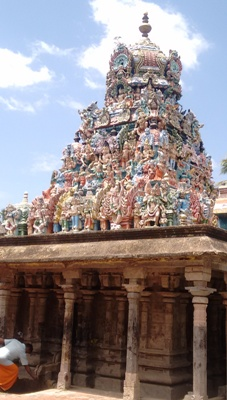
Central shrines of the temple

The presiding deity of the temple is Shiva in the name of Vanchinathan and the consort deity is Mangalambika. The sthala vriksham (sacred tree of this temple) is Sandalwood tree. The sacred tank of this sthalam (place) is called the GuptaGangai which is square in shape with 150 metres (490 ft). It is one of the shrines of the 275 Paadal Petra Sthalams. It is one of the rare temples where there is a separate shrine for Yama, the Hindu god of death. Yama is sported in seated posture with Chitragupta by his side. Gupta Ganga, Yama Theertham, Agni Theertham and Lakshmi Theertham are the various bodies of water associated with the temple. Masimagam is the most prominent festival in the temple when the festival image of Shiva is taken in the mount of Yama around the streets of Srivanchiyam.

Thiruvayyaru, Mayiladuthurai, Thiruvidaimaruthur, Thiruvenkadu, Chayavanam and Srivanchiyam are considered equivalents of Kasi. Like in Kasi, where the city is centered around Kashi Vishwanath Temple, the temples in these towns along the banks of river Cauvery, namely Aiyarappar temple in Thiruvaiyaru, Mahalingeswarar temple in Thiruvidaimarudur, Mayuranathaswamy temple in Mayiladuthurai, Chayavaneswarar temple in Sayavanam, Swetharanyeswarar temple in Thiruvenkadu, Srivanchinadhaswamy temple in Srivanchiyam are the centerpieces of the towns.

== Literary mention and religious importance ==
Appar, the 7th century Tamil saivite saint poet and nayanar has revered Kumbeswarar and the temple in his verses in Tevaram, compiled as the Fifth Tirumurai. As the temple is revered in Tevaram, it is classified as Paadal Petra Sthalam, one of the 276 temples that find mention in the Saiva canon. The temple is counted as the seventh in the list of temples in the southern banks of Cauvery. Appar has mentioned the temple in nine poems referring the place as Kudamuku and the deity as "Kumbesar".
