= Sayavaneswarar Temple =

Shiva temple in Sayavanam, Sirakzhi, Tamil Nadu, India

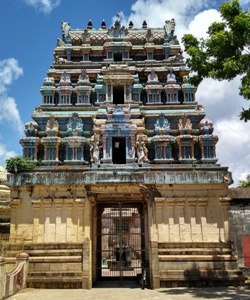

- Location in Tamil Nadu

Religion
- Affiliation: Hinduism
- District: Mayiladuthurai
- Deity: Sayavaneswarar(Shiva)

Location
- Location: Tamil Nadu, India
- State: Tamil Nadu
- Country: India
- Coordinates: 11°7′50″N 79°47′24″E

Architecture
- Type: Dravidian architecture

The Sayavaneswarar Temple or Chaayaavaneswarar is a Hindu temple situated in the village of Thirusaikkadu [or Thiruchaykkadu or Chaayavanam] near Kaveripoompattinam or Puhar, Mayiladuthurai in Mayiladuthurai district of Tamil Nadu, India. The presiding deity is the Hindu god Shiva. The temple dates from the time of the Medieval Cholas. The Saivite Nayanmars have sung of the temple in their songs.

== The Temple ==
Tiruvaiyaru, Mayiladuthurai, Thiruvidaimarudur, Thiruvenkadu, Chayavanam and Srivanchiyam are considered equivalents of Kasi. Like in Kasi, where the city is centered around Kashi Vishwanath Temple, the temples in these towns along the banks of river Cauvery, namely Aiyarappar temple in Thiruvaiyaru, Mahalingeswarar temple in Thiruvidaimarudur, Mayuranathaswamy temple in Mayiladuthurai, Chayavaneswarar temple in Sayavanam, Swetharanyeswarar temple in Thiruvenkadu, Srivanchinadhaswamy Koil in Srivanchiyam are the centerpieces of the towns.

=== Idol Theft ===
An idol of Standing Sambandar was stolen sometime between 1965 and 1975 (There is documentary proof from 1958 by the French Institute of Pondicherry) and was traced by the Idol Wing of the Tamil Nadu Criminal Investigation Department (IW-CID) with the help of volunteer-collective India Pride Project to National Gallery of Australia in Australia and was successfully recovered in 2022.

== Literary mention ==
Sambandar describes the feature of the deity as:

வேத நாவினர் வெண்பளிங் கின்குழைக் காதர்

ஓத நஞ்சணி கண்ட ருகந்துரை கோயில்
மாதர் வண்டுதன் காதல்வண் டாடிய புன்னைத்

தாது கண்ட பொழின்மறைந் தூடுசாய்க்காடே.

Tirunavukkarasar describes the feature of the deity as:

புயங்கமைஞ் ஞான்கும் பத்து மாயகொண் டரக்க னோடிச்

சிவன்றிரு மலையைப் பேர்க்கத் திருமலர்க் குழலி யஞ்ச
வியன்பெற வெய்தி வீழ விரல்சிறி தூன்றி மீண்டே

சயம்பெற நாம மீந்தார் சாய்க்காடு மேவி னாரே.

== Photo gallery ==
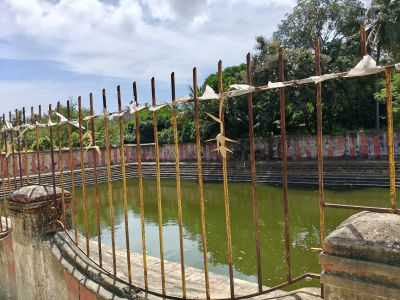
Temple tank

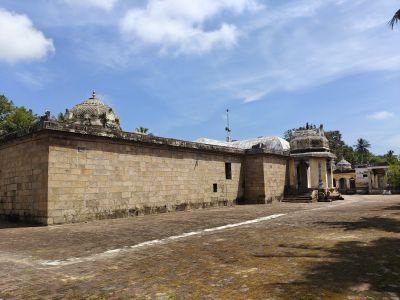
Vimana of the presiding deity (from the prakara)

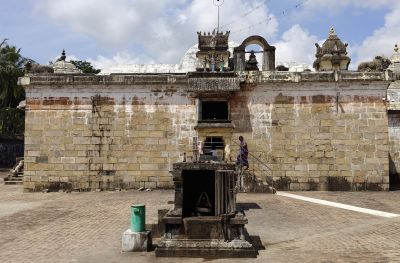
Front mandapa

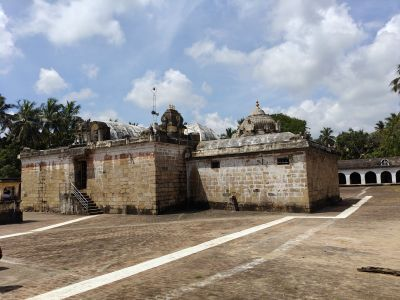
Prakara

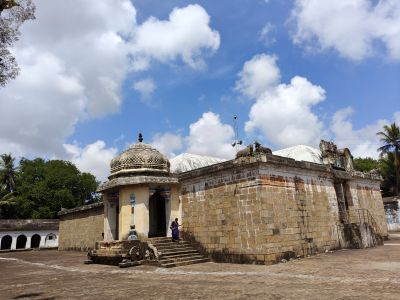
Prakara
