= Mahalingeswarar Temple, Thiruvidaimarudur =

Hindu temple in Thanjavur

Tiruvidaimarudur
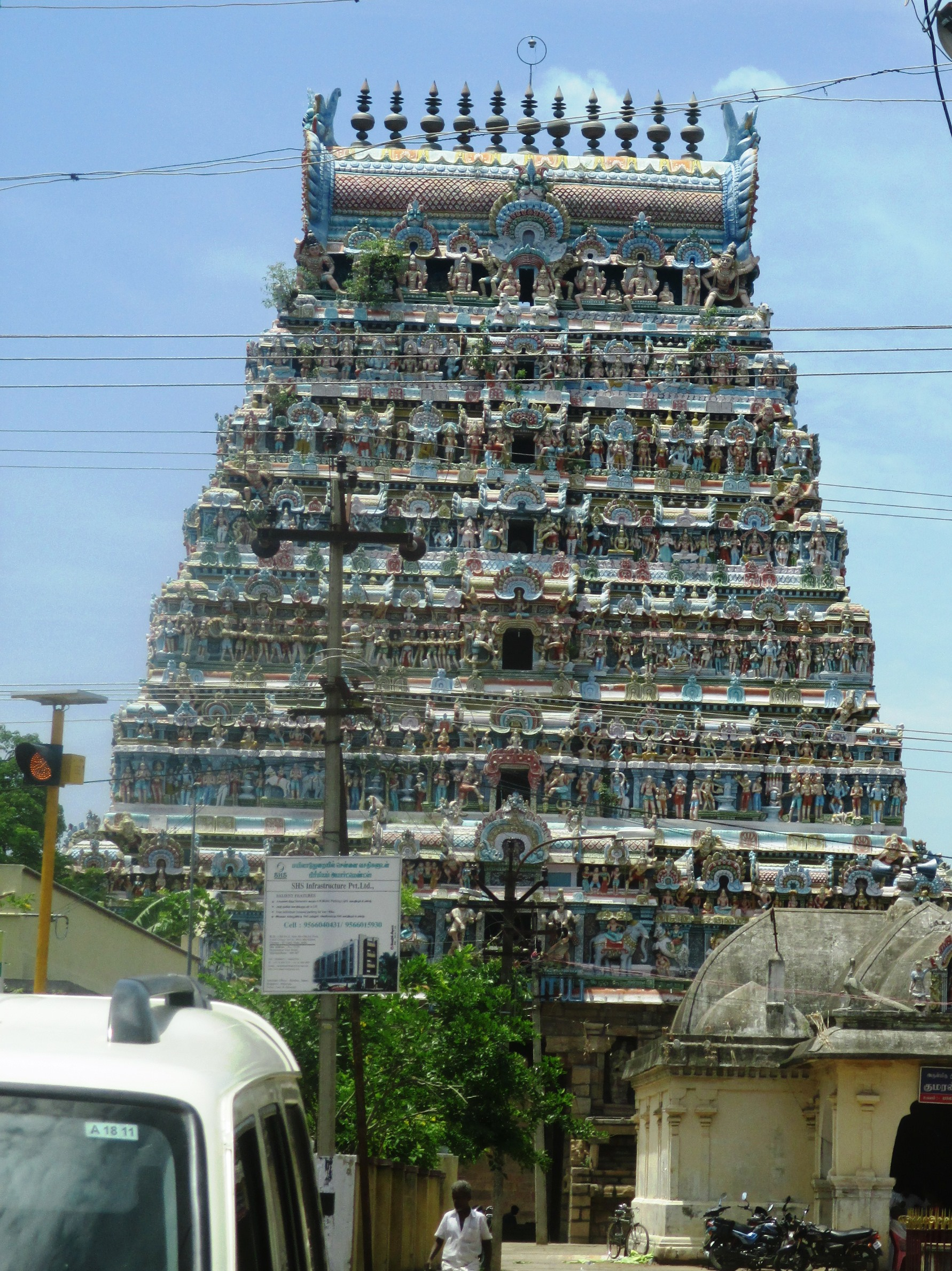
- The gateway tower of the temple

- Location in Tamil Nadu

Religion
- Affiliation: Hinduism
- District: Thanjavur
- Deity: Mahalingaswamy(Shiva) Bruhatsundarakuchaambigai(Mookambika)
- Features: Temple tank: Kaveri, Karunya and Amirta Theertam

Location
- Location: Tiruvidaimarudur
- State: Tamil Nadu
- Country: India
- Coordinates: 10°59′40″N 79°27′01″E

Architecture
- Type: Tamil architecture
- Creator: Chola kingdom

Mahalingeswaraswamy Temple, Thiruvidaimarudur is a Hindu temple dedicated to the deity Shiva, located in Tiruvidaimaruthur, a village in the South Indian state of Tamil Nadu. It is significant to the Hindu sect of Saivism as one of the seven major Shiva temples. Shiva is worshiped as Mahalingeswaraswamy, and is represented by the lingam, with his idol referred to as Jyothirmayalingam. His consort Mookambika is depicted as Devi Bruhatsundarakuchaambika or Bruhatsundarakuchaambigai amman. The lingam of the temple is believed to be the focal point for the seven consorts of Shiva. The presiding deity is revered in the 7th-century-CE Tamil Saiva canonical work, the Tevaram, written by Tamil poet saints known as the nayanars and classified as Paadal Petra Sthalam. The 9th-century-CE Saiva saint poet Manikkavacakar has sung praise about the temple in his works. Pattinattar, one of the revered saints visited this shrine many times .

There are 149 inscriptions associated with the temple indicating contributions from Pandyas, Cholas, Thanjavur Nayaks and Thanjavur Maratha kingdom. The oldest parts of the present masonry structure were built during the Chola dynasty in the 9th century, while later expansions, including the towering gopuram gatehouses, are attributed to later periods, up to the Thanjavur Nayaks during the 16th century.

The temple complex is one of the largest in the state and it houses four gateway towers known as gopurams. The temple has numerous shrines, with those of Mahalingeswaraswamy, Bruhatsundarakuchaambika and Mookambigai ( or Devi Mookambika ) being the most prominent. The temple complex houses many halls and three precincts; the most notable is the second precinct built during the Vijayanagar period that has many sculptures. The temple has six daily rituals at various times from 5:30 a.m. to 10 p.m., and twelve yearly festivals on its calendar. The temple is maintained and administered by Thiruvaduthurai Adheenam, a South Indian monastic institution.

== Legend ==
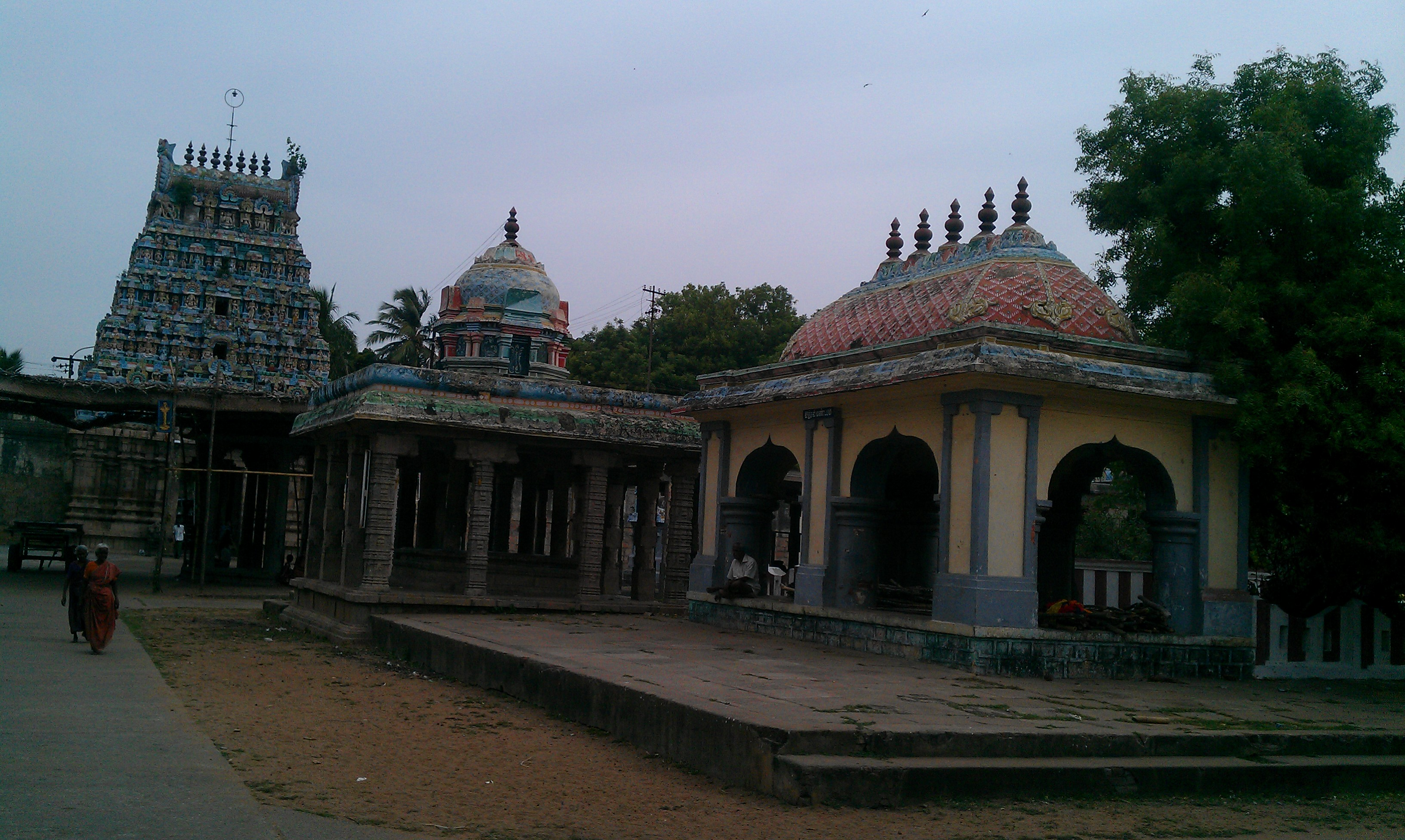
Tiruvidaimaruthur temple

The name "Kumbakonam", roughly translated in English as the "Jug's Corner", is believed to be an allusion to the mythical pot (kumbha) of the Hindu god Brahma that contained the seed of all living beings on earth. The kumbha is believed to have been displaced by a pralaya (dissolution of the universe) and ultimately came to rest at the spot where the town of Kumbakonam now stands. The drops of nectar are believed to have fallen onto five shrines around Kumbakonam, namely Mahalingeswarar temple at Tiruvidaimarudur, Tirudharasuram, Naganathar Temple at Tirunageswaram, Tiruvorgam and Tirupadalavanam.

The legend of a Chola prince who killed a Brahmin and was in turn, pursued by his spirit (Brahmarakshas), is associated with the temple. The Chola prince, it is believed, entered the Mahalingeswarar Temple and prayed to his favourite God, Shiva for relief from the clutches of the spirit of the dead Brahmin or brahmarakshas. The Chola prince made his way out through another entrance thereby saving himself. Some sources associate the legend with Pandya king Varagunapandian. It continues till day where people take the second entrance to exit the premises after worship. There is a sculpture of Chola brahmaharakshas on the eastern premises in one of the inner gopurams (tower gateway).

Shiva is believed to have appeared as a flame to please Agastya and other sages who were performing penance. Shiva (Rudra) is said to have emanated from the heart of Mookambika. It is also believed that several other deities like Vinayaga, Murugan, Parvathi, Kali, Lakshmi, Saraswathi, Brahma, Airavata (the elephant of celestial king Indra) and Vishnu worshipped Mahalingaswamy.

== Etymology ==
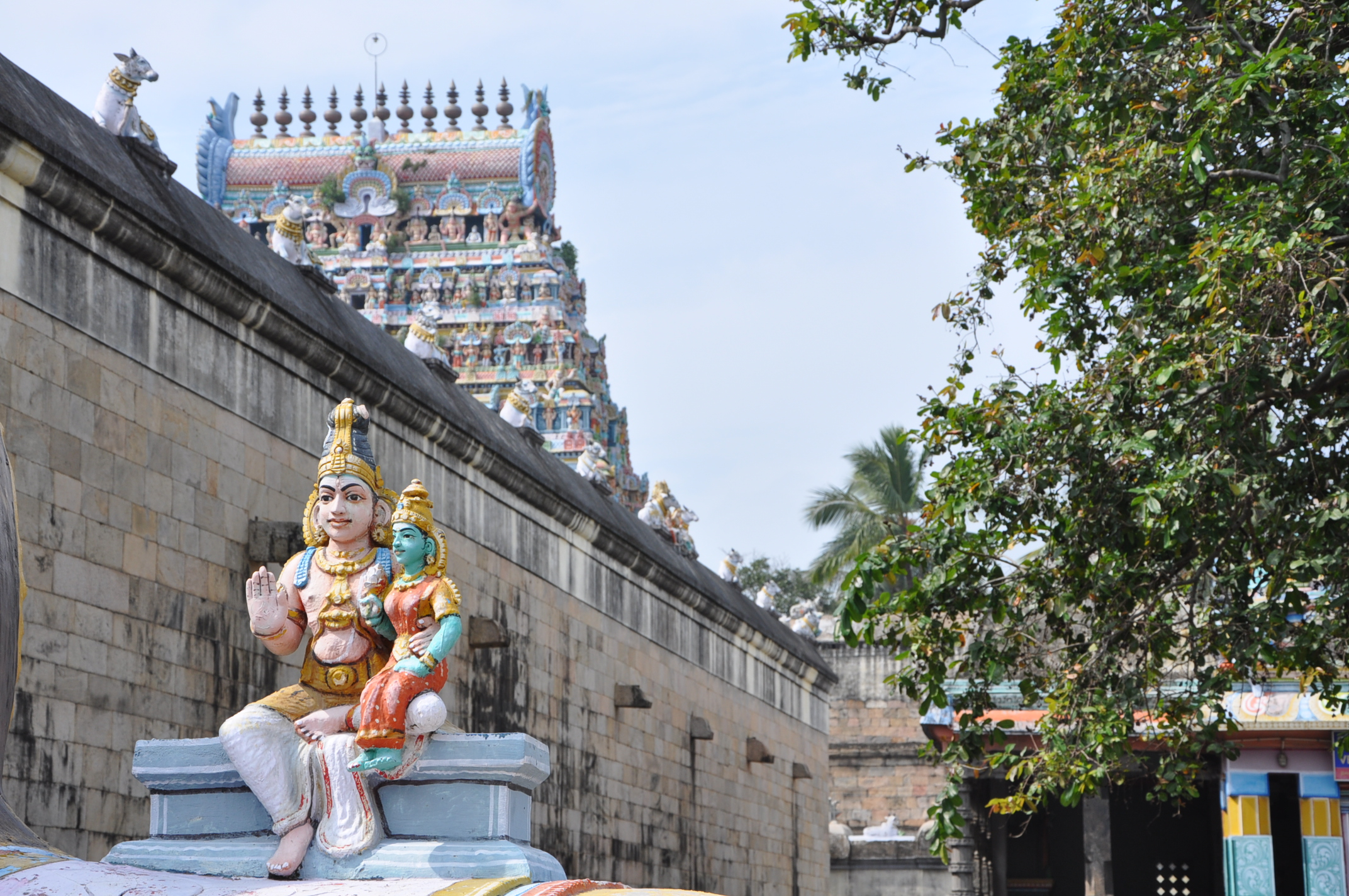
Image of the second precinct

Marudur is derived from the name of the holy tree, namely Maruda. The Sthala Vriksha (temple tree) is Maruda. This temple is classified as Madhya Arjunam, called Idai Maruthu meaning centre Marudur. The Mallikarjuna swamy temple are Srisailam is called Thalai Maruthu (meaning top Marudur) and Tirupudaimaruthur temple at Ambasamudram in Tirunelveli district is called Kadai Maruthu (meaning lower Marudur). Since Shiva raised out as a flame to the sages, the presiding deity is also referred as Jyothirmaya Mahalingam. Historically Shiva was worshipped as Jyothi, the sacred flame and with the course of time, Jyothrilinga temples were developed. Since the place is full of Maruda tree, Shiva is also referred as Marudavanan. The Sanskrit word for the Tamil word Maruda is Arjuna vruksham.

== Inscriptions ==
There are a total of 149 inscriptions associated with the temple. According to legend, the site of the temple at Thiruvidaimarudur has been used for over 2,000 years and is associated with the Pandya king Varaguna Pandian. The temple contains inscriptions of the Hoysala kings and some Vijayanagara grants, and many records of the later Nayaks and Marathas. The inscriptions in the walls of the temple are from Kulothunga Chola I indicating revenue survey and settlement and other additions made inside the temple. This inscription (No. 32 of 1895) on the second precinct records a grant of 120 sheep for two lamps and the pujaris and inhabitants are appointed trustees of the grant. The date is the 172nd day of 26th year of the reign of Kulothunga I, who conquered the Kalinga region. The other inscriptions mention the name of the queen and adore her as the "mistress of the whole world". Three other queens, Dinachintamani, Elisai Vallabhi and Tyagavalli.

The temple is also famous historically for devadasi tradition, which involves donating dance women to the temple during the medieval period. The inscriptions indicate the tradition, dances, rearrangement during festivals and procession of deities during festivals. The record is dated in the seventh reignal year of Vikrama Chola (1118-35 CE). There are five inscriptions in this vein from the 10th century and there are three later inscriptions date 1123 CE, 1142 CE and 1218 CE. The possible reasoning for the hundred-year gap indicates the shifting of all temple women to Brihadeeswarar temple by Rajaraja I. Since the temple received lot of gifts, the Cholas deputed a special army to protect the endowments.

== Architecture ==
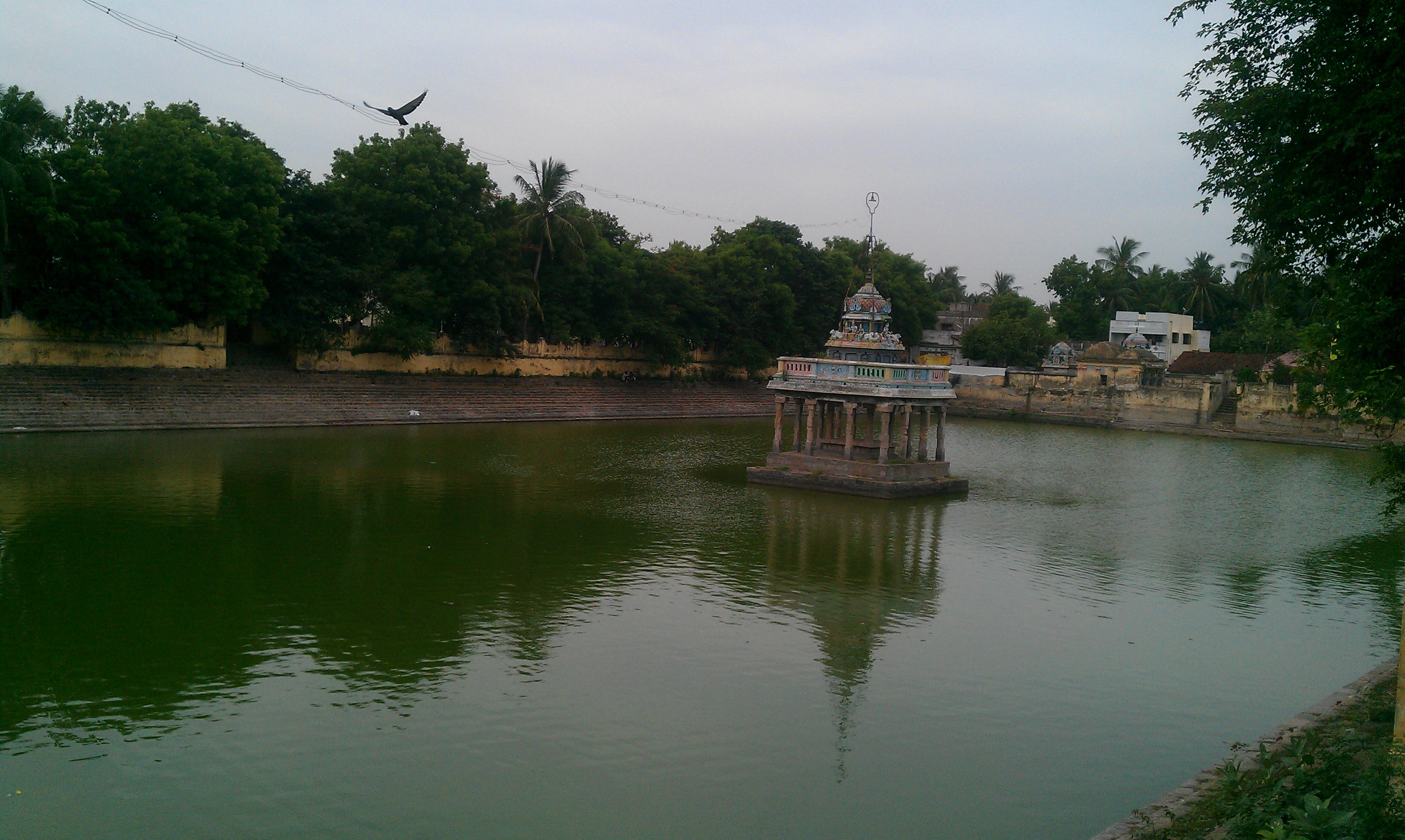
A view of the temple tank

The temple is located in Tiruvidaimaruthur, a village in the South Indian state of Tamil Nadu, 8 km (5.0 mi) away from Kumbakonam on the Kumbakonam - Mayiladuthurai highway. The temple has a five-tiered Rajagopuram and three precincts, each enclosed inside huge walls and having gateway towers for each of them. The temple is rectangular in plan with east–west orientation and has four entrances in each of the four directions. Mahalingam, literally meaning big lingam, is the presiding deity and is considered the centre of all consort deities of Tamil Nadu. There are five temple tanks inside the temple, namely Karunyamirdha Theertham, Soma Theertham, Kanaga Theertham, Kalyana Theertham and Iravatha Theertham. There are 27 other water bodies that are associated with the temple. There is a separate shrine for Mookambiga and it is built in north Indian style. The shrine of Mookambiga is where Parvathi is believed to have performed her penance. There are stone images of Pattinathar and Bhadragiriyar in the eastern and western gateways of the temple respectively. The central shrine of the temple is that of Mahalingaswamy facing East. The shrine of Ambal faces the east and is situated close to the Mookambigai Amman shrine. The temple was widely expanded during the Nayak period in the 16th century with the development of twin Mahalinga and Devi shrines. The shrines of Muruga and Nataraja are enshrined in the spaces between the pier. There are other shrines for Padithurai Vinayagar and Agora Veerabadrar.

The three precincts are called Aswametha Pradakshina, Kodumudi and Pranava. The Vinayagar in the Southern side is called Anda Vinayagar and as per Hindu legend, the Vinayagar ruled the world and hence obtained the name. Pranava precinct has lot of sculptures dating back to the Nayak period of the 16th century. One of the notable among them is the sculpture of a chariot having twelve pillars, each denoting the twelve lagnas. In the northern portion of Kodumudi precinct, there is an image of Chokkanathar.

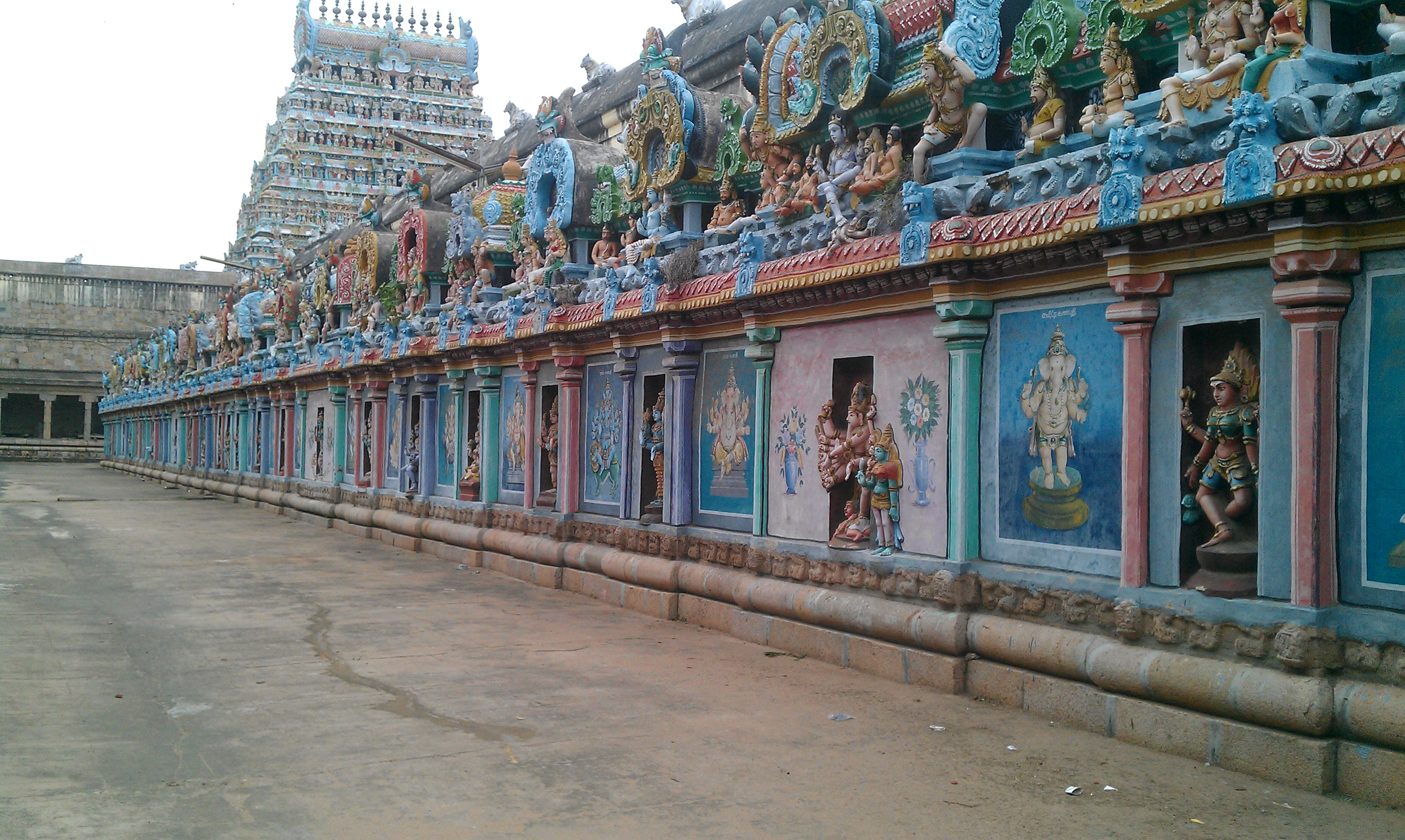
The second precinct of the temple portraying sculptures

The piers standing has attached colonettes, lotus beams and suspended beams are atypical of Nayak style though the attached hall and innermost compound are recent additions. Govinda Dikshitar, the minister of Nayak is believed to have built the Pushyamantapas (halls) in this temple. Achyutappa also added gift of a village to the temple, the income of which was to be utilized for the temple car festival for the goddess in Adipuram day.

Thanjavur Marathas ruled the region during the 18th century. Pratap Singh (1736–63) was a patron of the temple after his prayer to Mahalingaswamy to marry love was fulfilled. He is believed to have donated one lakh metal lamps to the temple. His concubine Theepanachiar is believed to have personified as one of the lamps. An ornamental metal image of a lady called Pavai Nonbu holding a lamp is still present in temple. The base of the lamp has an inscription indicating the gift of Marathas to the temple.

In modern times, the temple is maintained and administered by Thiruvaduthurai Adheenam, a South Indian monastic institution. A Saiva Siddantha library inside the temple maintains palm leaf manuscripts and Saiva literature. The temple is one of the most visited temples in the district.

== Worship and festivals ==
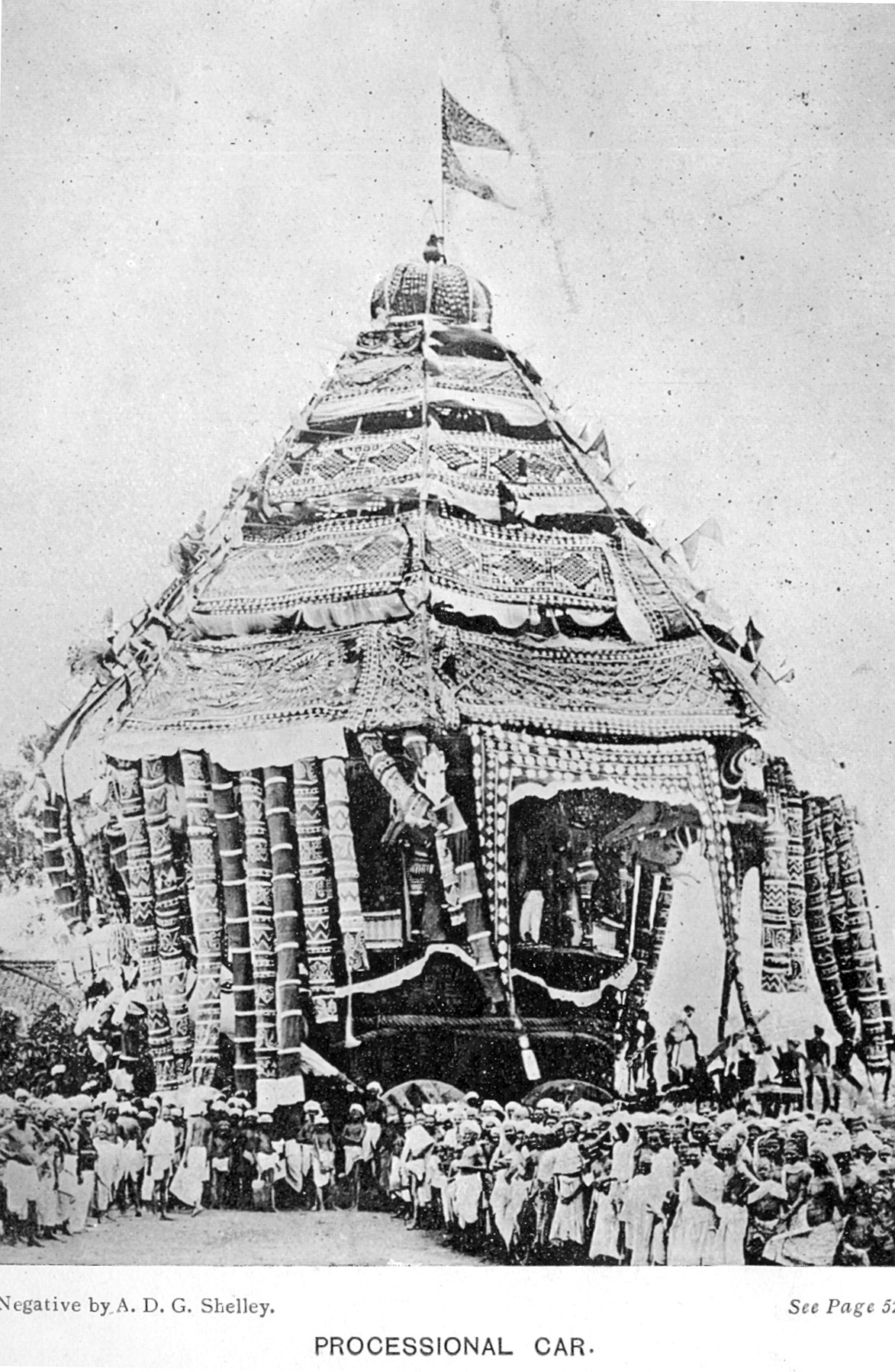
Historic image of temple car of the temple

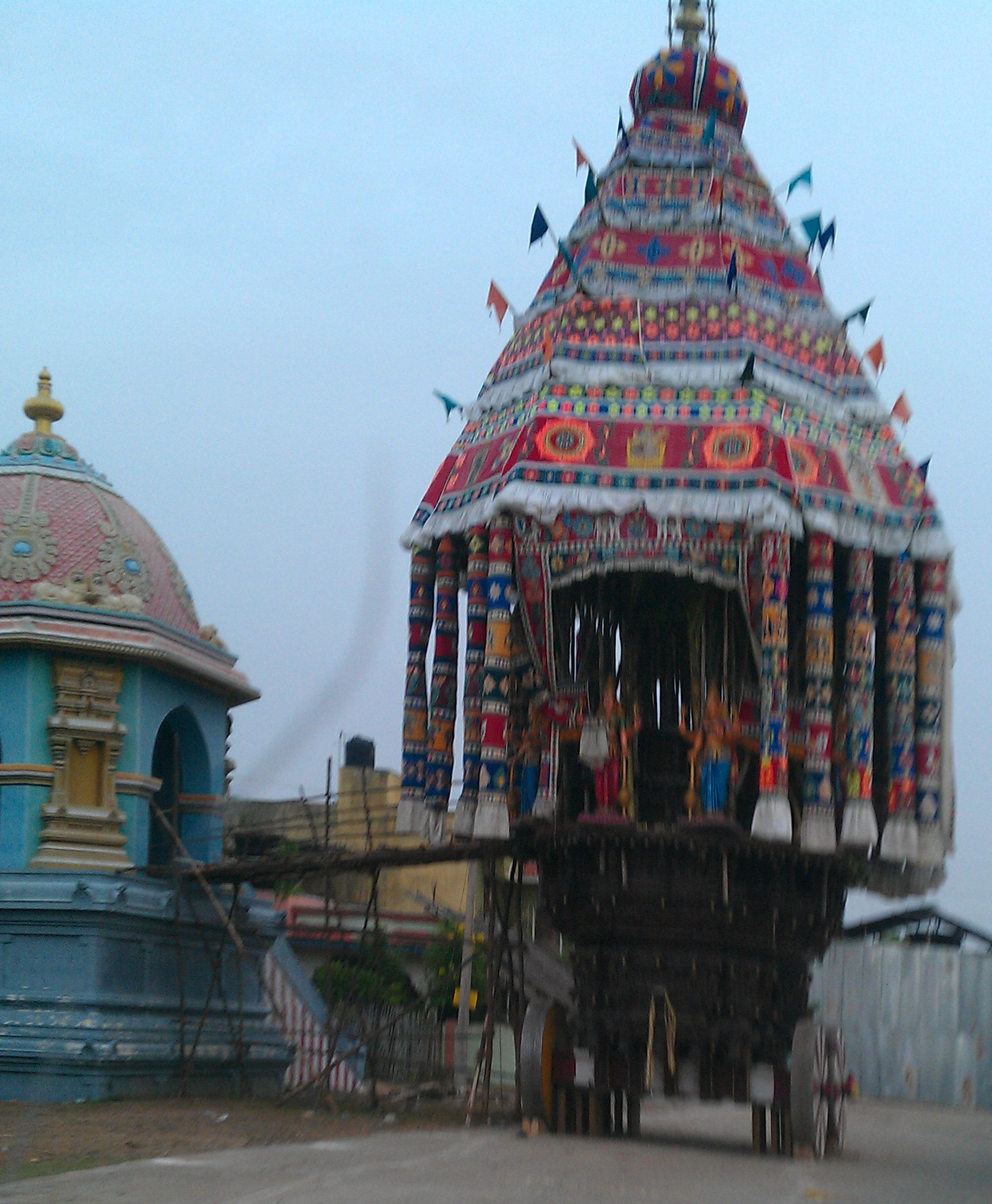
Modern image of temple car of the temple

The temple priests perform the pooja (rituals) during festivals and on a daily basis. Like other Shiva temples of Tamil Nadu, the priests belong to the Shaivaite community, a Brahmin sub-caste. The temple rituals are performed six times a day; Ushathkalam at 6:00 a.m., Kalasanthi at 8:00 a.m., Uchikalam at 12:00 p.m., Sayarakshai at 6:00 p.m., Irandamkalam at 8:00 p.m. and Ardha Jamam at 9:00 p.m. Each ritual comprises four steps: abhisheka (sacred bath), alangaram (decoration), neivethanam (food offering) and deepa aradanai (waving of lamps) for both Mahalingeswarar and Pirguchuntaragujambigai. The worship is held amidst music with nadhaswaram (pipe instrument) and tavil (percussion instrument), religious instructions in the Vedas read by priests and prostration by worshippers in front of the temple mast. There are weekly rituals like somavaram and sukravaram, fortnightly rituals like pradosham and monthly festivals like amavasai (new moon day), kiruthigai, pournami (full moon day) and sathurthi. The most prominent festival of the temple, Thaipoosam, is celebrated for ten days during the Tamil month of Thai. The festival deity of Mahalingeswarar and his consort circumambulate the temple and the streets in the village in different vehicles. The festival ends with Theerthavari on the last day. During the Tamil month of Vaikasi, Tirukalyanam (sacred marriage), Ambal Tapasu (penance of Ambal), Ambal Thannai thaane festivals are celebrated.

== Religious significance ==
According to Hindu legend, Mahalingaswamy is the centre of all Shiva temples in the region and the Saptha Vigraha moorthis (seven prime consorts in all Shiva temples) are located at seven cardinal points around the temple, located in various parts of the state. The seven deities are Nataraja in Chidambaram Nataraja Temple at Chidambaram, Chandikeswarar temple at Tirucheingalur, Vinayagar in Vellai Vinayagar Temple at Thiruvalanchuzhi, Muruga in Swamimalai Murugan Temple at Swamimalai, Bhairava in Sattainathar Temple at Sirkali, Navagraha in Sooriyanar Temple at Suryanar Kovil and Dakshinamoorthy in Apatsahayesvarar Temple, Alangudi at Alangudi, Papanasam taluk. The other deities of a Shiva temple associated with Mahalingeswaraswamy are Durga in Thenupuriswarar Temple at Patteswaram, Somaskanda in Thyagaraja Temple, Tiruvarur at Tiruvarur and Nandi at Tiruvavaduthurai Temple at Thiruvaduthurai. Thiruvayyaru, Mayiladuthurai, Thiruvidaimaruthur, Thiruvenkadu, Chayavanam and Srivanchiyam are considered equivalents of Kasi. Like in Kasi, where the city is centered around Kashi Vishwanath Temple, the temples in these towns along the banks of river Cauvery, namely Aiyarappar temple in Thiruvaiyaru, Mahalingeswarar temple in Thiruvidaimarudur, Mayuranathaswamy temple in Mayiladuthurai, Chayavaneswarar temple in Sayavanam, Swetharanyeswarar temple in Thiruvenkadu, Srivanchinadhaswamy Koil in Srivanchiyam are the centerpieces of the towns. The temple is counted as one of the temples built on the banks of River Kaveri.

The temple is also referred as Pancha Linga stala due to the presence of five lingams, four of which in the cardinal directions and the fifth one at the centre. The temple of Viswanatha lies in the east street, Rishipuriswara in the west, Atmanatha in South street and Chokkanatha in North street.

Om symbol Sapthavigraha Moorthis Om symbol
Saptha Vigraha moorthis are the seven prime consorts in all Shiva temples located at seven cardinal points around the temple
Deity	Temple	Location
Shiva	Mahalingaswamy temple	Tiruvidaimarudur
Durga	Thenupuriswarar Temple	Patteswaram
Vinayaga	Vellai Vinayagar Temple	Thiruvalanchuzhi
Murugan	Swamimalai Murugan temple	Swamimalai
Nataraja	Natarajar temple	Chidambaram
Dakshinamurthy	Apatsahayesvarar Temple	Alangudi
Navagraha	Suryanar Kovil	Suryanar Kovil

== Literary mention ==
The temple is revered in the verses of Tevaram, the 7th century saivite canonical work by the three poet saints namely, Appar, Sundarar and Thirugnanasambandhar. Appar has glorified the temple in five, Sundarar in one and Thirugnanasambandhar in six verses. Appar refers the temple as Idaimaruthur.

"பாச மொன்றில ராய்ப்பல பக்தர்கள்
வாச நாண்மலர் கொண்டடி வைகலும்
ஈச நென்பெறு மான்இடை மருதினிற்
பூச நாம்புகு தும்புன லாடவே"

In another verse, he hails the deity here as

மங்கை காணக் கொடார்மண மாலையைக்
கங்கை காணக் கொடார்முடிக் கண்ணியை
நங்கை மீர் இடைக் மருதரிந் நங்கைக்கே
எங்கு வாங்கிக் கொடுத்தார் இதழியே

translating to

"Praise to you father in Idaimaruthur.
Praise to you who carried Ganges river in your plait."

Appar's verses point out the saiva agamas practised during the period.

"Because of our loneliness it is difficult for us to keep company of with dark ghosts
So my tongue will go on uttering the saiva agamas in the presence of the companion (mind)
to the accompaniment of the unrivalled music of Tiruvidaimaruthur"

Maanickyavasagar praises the deity here as under

"You are the Eesan who had blessed Brahman, Vishnu and Indra when they bowed.
You descended on earth and disclosed your perfect ways.
You, in your grace, gave supreme virtues to that good dame of Idaimaruthur that is full of mansions set with good and brightful gems
Our Lords are those who know that grace"

The temple is also revered in the verses of Karnnantheva, Pattinathar and Manikkavacakar.

== Photogallery ==
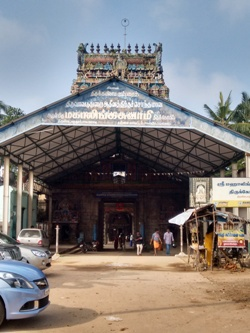

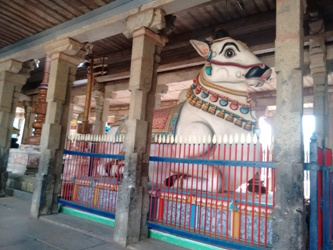

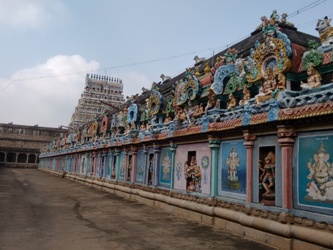

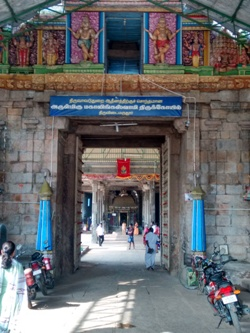

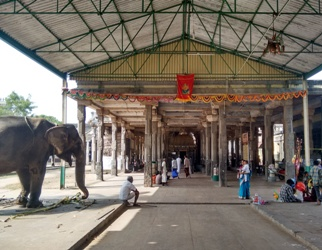

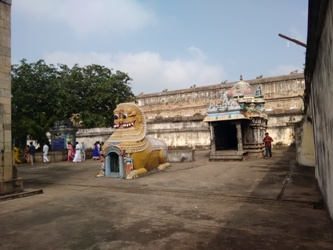

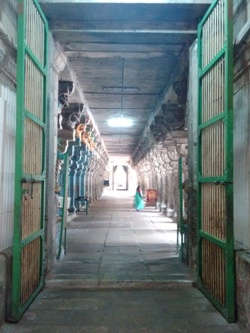
