= K. Kalyanasundaram Pillai =

Indian Bharatanatyam dancer, guru, and choreographer (born 1932)

- K. Kalyanasundaram Pillai receiving the Padma Shri in 2023
- Born: March 1, 1932 (age 94); Thiruvidaimarudur, Tamil Nadu, India
- Occupations: Bharatanatyam Guru and Choreographer
- Known for: Thanjavur Bani of Bharatanatyam
- Awards: Padma Shri (2023); Sangeet Natak Akademi Award; Kalaimamani

K. Kalyanasundaram Pillai (born March 1, 1932) is an Indian Bharatanatyam dancer, Guru, and choreographer associated with the Thanjavur Bani of Bharatanatyam. He belongs to a traditional Nattuvanar lineage of Tamil Nadu and has contributed to the preservation and transmission of the classical margam repertoire. In 2023, he was awarded the Padma Shri, the fourth-highest civilian award of India, for his contribution to the field of arts.

== Early life ==
Kalyanasundaram Pillai was born in 1932 in Thiruvidaimarudur, Tamil Nadu, into a hereditary family of nattuvanars. He received his training in Bharatanatyam under senior members of his family following the guru–shishya tradition.

== Career ==
Kalyanasundaram Pillai has been associated with the teaching and choreography of Bharatanatyam for several decades. His work reflects the characteristics of the Thanjavur bani, noted for its structured presentation and emphasis on rhythmic precision.

He has trained numerous disciples and has contributed to the continuation of traditional repertoire through performances and institutional teaching.

== Awards ==
K. Kalyanasundaram Pillai has received several honours for his contribution to Indian classical dance:

- Padma Shri (2023)
- Sangeet Natak Akademi Award
- Kalaimamani Award, Government of Tamil Nadu
- Natyacharyasekharah from TSN's Percussive Arts Centre (TSNPAC)
