= Virasolanar River =

Coordinates: 11.0163°N 79.7654°E

Virasolanar River Veera Cholan river
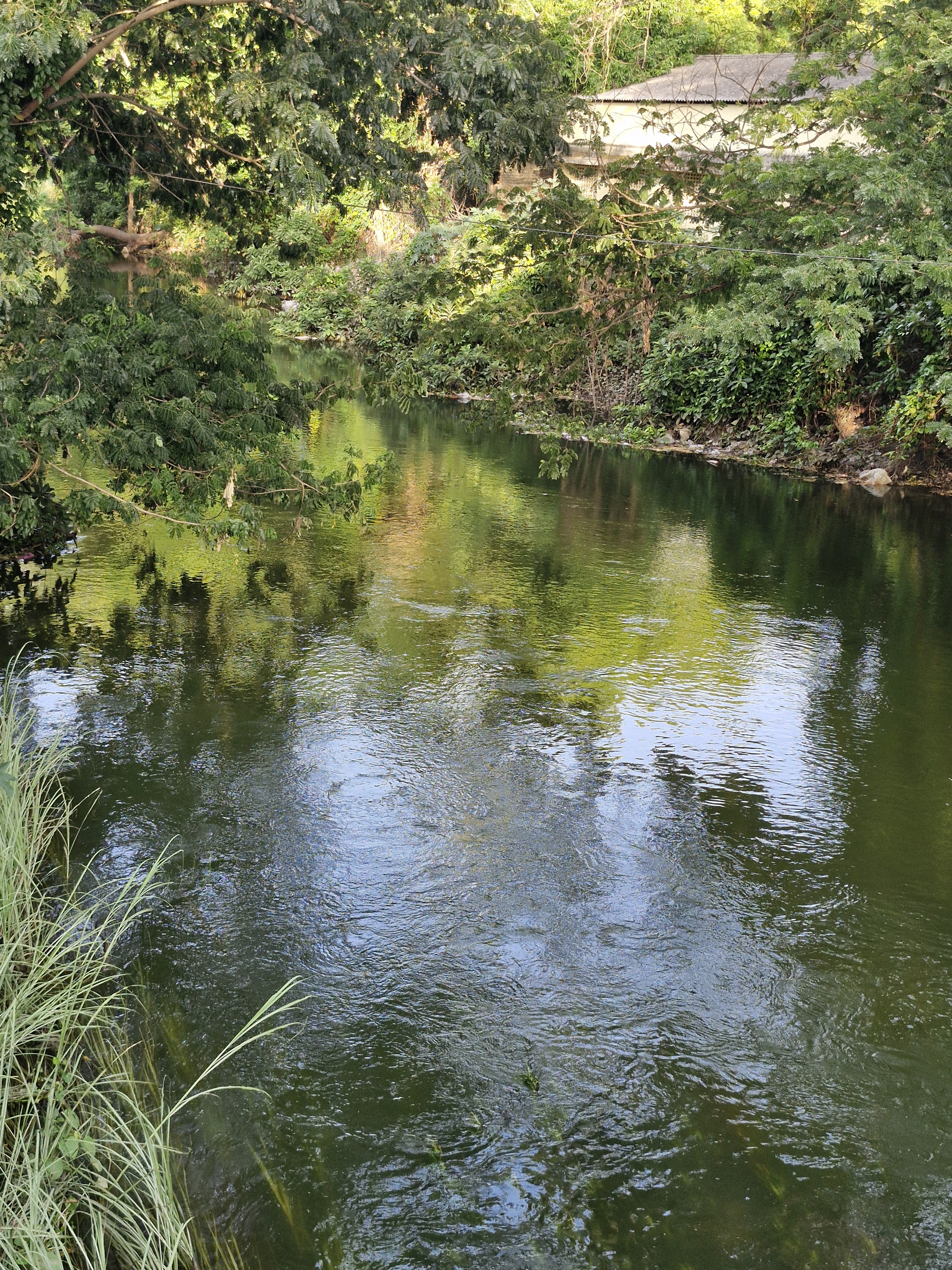
- The Virasolanar river at Manganallur Village, Mayiladuthurai district, Tamil Nadu, flowing at the brim in June 2025.
- Native name: வீர சோழன் ஆறு

Location
- Country: India
- State: Tamil Nadu
- Region: South India
- Origin: Thiruvidaimarudur

Physical characteristics
- Mouth: Bay of Bengal
  - location: Tharangambadi
  - elevation: 17.00m
- Length: 145 kilometres (90 mi)

The Virasolanar river, also known as Veera Cholan river, is a significant distributary of the Cauvery River in the Cauvery Delta of Tamil Nadu and the Karaikal region of the Union Territory of Puducherry, India.

== Geography and Course ==
The river originates near Thiruvidaimarudur in Thanjavur district and flows eastward through Mayiladuthurai, Nagapattinam, and Karaikal, before emptying into the Bay of Bengal near Tharangambadi. The river supports local agriculture, particularly paddy cultivation, and plays an important ecological and cultural role in the region. Government records such as weir tender documents mark locations up to 145 kilometres (90 mi)

== Historical Background ==
The name Veera Cholan refers to a valorous Chola king, though no specific historical inscriptions directly identify the river’s origin. The river is among the many Cauvery distributaries that sustained the agrarian economy of the Chola dynasty.

In recent decades, the river has been part of irrigation development schemes, including World Bank–assisted projects under the Cauvery Delta Sub Basin program, aimed at modernizing weirs, banks, and sluices along the river to improve water management.

== Ecological Importance ==
The river plays an essential role in the seasonal ecology of the delta. During the monsoon, it carries substantial freshwater flow, while in the dry season, the water level often drops significantly. In extreme conditions such as the 2016 Tamil Nadu drought, parts of the river nearly dried up, causing groundwater shortages in affected villages.

The river irrigates rice fields, supports wetland biodiversity, and helps maintain the Great Vedaranyam Swamp, a Ramsar-listed wetland. The swamp and associated mangroves are important habitats for migratory birds, aquatic species, and fisheries. Although the river has limited industrial pollution, challenges such as water overuse, siltation, and encroachment remain concerns. Following the 2004 tsunami, restoration efforts were initiated to strengthen the river’s banks and improve coastal resilience.

== Cultural and Religious Significance ==
The Veera Cholan River holds cultural and religious significance in the region. Notably, it flows past the Mahalingeswarar Temple in Thiruvidaimarudur, one of Tamil Nadu’s important Shaivite pilgrimage sites. The temple’s sacred tank, known as the Mahalingaswamy Kulam, is believed to be fed directly by the Virasolanar River. Devotees consider bathing in the river a ritual purification.

== See also ==
- List of rivers of Tamil Nadu
