= Budhan =

Village in Himachal Pradesh, India

Budhan is a village in Sub Division Bijhari and Tehsil Barsar, Hamirpur district, Himachal Pradesh, India. The village is in the outer Sivalik Hills at an average elevation of 800 meters. It is located in Hamirpur, situated to the east of Bilaspur district.

Its major tourist attractions fall in the middle of Hamirpur and Bilaspur Districts which include the Dhauladhar Range, Naina Devi Hills, Swarghat and Bahadurpur Hills, which can be easily seen from the hilltop of this village. The Gram Panchayat Bhawan is located on the Bijhri to Barthin road. Budhan has a primary health centre and veterinary centre. Population of 580 people. Registered NGO "Gram Sudhar Sabha" was founded by residents who coordinate with Panchayat Pradhan for the matters related to the development of the area.

== Climate ==
Summers in Budhan can be extremely hot, with average temperatures ranging from 31 °C to 42 °C in June. The rainy season is mid-June to early September. Whereas upper Himachal experiences chilling winters, the weather in the lower region is moderate, with winter temperatures typically falling between 20 °C to −2 °C. Sometimes, the village also experiences mild snowfall, mostly on the hills.

== Native plants and animals ==
Budhan is located at an average elevation of 800 meters above sea level with a wide range of natural pine forest trees spread all over the area. There are some lakes that are home to common fish and other aquatic creatures, as well as other tropical species of reptiles and birds. Towards the end of the twentieth century, the village has witnessed a swift increase in the population of primates such as monkeys and langurs.

== Demographics ==
Budhan consists of a Hindu population of mostly Brahmins (89%) and Rajputs (11%). To meet the occupational needs, many people of the village work elsewhere, such as Ludhiana, Chandigarh, New Delhi, Dubai and other locations.

The 2011 census records the population across Budhan Uparla and Budhan Jhikla as 204.

== Geography ==
The area is in the southern edge of Hamirpur District, where on its north are the Himalayas ranges and the lower hills of Bilaspur, Kangra and Mandi Districts. Shukkar Khad is a small river that flows through the valley formed by Budhan Hills and Vaishno Devi Hills.

== Education ==
The village has a 98% literacy rate.
