= Srivanchiyam =

- village
- Country: India
- State: Tamil Nadu
- District: Thiruvarur

Languages
  - Official: Tamil
- Time zone: UTC+5:30 (IST)
- PIN: 610110

Srivanchiyam is a village located in Tiruvarur District, Tamil Nadu, and is best known for its Vanchinadha Swamy temple. According to the 2011 Census, Srivanchiyam has a geographical area of 428.27 hectares and a population headcount of 2518, with the nearest town being Nannilam, which is 5 kilometres away.

== Sri Vanchinadha Swamy Temple ==
The Sri Vanchinadha Swamy temple is at the centre of the village. The central deity of the temple of the temple is the Lord Vanchinadar, a form of the Lord Shiva, and his consort is Mangalanayaki. The temple is over 1100 years old, and was built by the king Rajendra Chola in the year 850 CE.

=== Unique characteristics ===
One of the unique features of this temple is the separate shrine to the Hindu god of Death and Justice, Lord Yama. In the tradition of this temple, visitors make a visit to the shrine of Yama first before entering the temple, unlike in other temples where the Lord Ganesha is propitiated first. The temple also has two statues of Nandi, one on the east side and one on the west.

This temple is among the six temples in cauvery river bank which are equivalent to Kasi. The list of temples on cauvery river bank which are equivalent to have powers of kasi visvanatha temple are mentioned below

° Thiruvaiyaru ° Thiruvidaimarudur ° Mayiladuthurai ° Sayavanam (Near Poompuhar) ° Thiruvengadu ° Thiruvanjiam (Srivanchiyam)

A visit to the above Siva temples in Cauvery river bank are said to resolve the Sins of the siva bhakta and his/her ancestors. The holy Yama theertham and Gupta Ganga are the temple theerthams. If pithru tharpana is done in this place, it is said to give salvation to the departed souls. Death at this place is considered sacred and equivalent to Kashi as Lord Vanchinadha gives Moksha to the souls which depart in the soil of srivanchiyam. This temple is even open during solar and lunar eclipse (it is a contrast to all temples which would be closed during eclipses). It is a common practice to close the temple when there is a death in the village, but vanchinadhar temple is not closed when any person dies in the village. the Gupta Gangai is considered even more sacred than the Ganges at Kasi.

== Karthigai Gnayeru Festival ==
During the Tamil month of Kaarththigai, Theerthavari is conducted in the Guptha Gangai on all Sundays. It also includes a ten-day festival and a car festival at the end of the month. Raghu and Kethu gods are inside of Sri Vanchinathar temple. It is the famous temple for sani bhagavan (Separate temple for the sani bhagavan). This place located in between kodavasal and Nannilam. There are other small temples located in this village.

== Transportation ==
For Road Distances refer www.visittemples.com

Bus Route 430 operates from Kumbakonam Bus station to Nagapattinam via Nanilam). Bus Route 28 and 335 operate from Kumbakonam Bus station to Nannilam. Passengers can get down at Achuthamangalam. Apart from these buses there are direct buses to Srivanchiyam from Kumbakonam, operated by National which depart at 6 a.m, 9.30a.m, 1.30p.m and 5.30 p.m and returns from Kumbakonam at 7.45 a.m, 11.30 a.m, 3.30 p.m and 8 p.m. Passengers can get down at the stop near the temple and walk to the temple. The journey from Kumbakonam to Srivanchiyam takes approximately one hour and fifteen minutes.

Auto rickshaws are available to reach Srivanchiyam from Actchudhamagalam (2 km) Approximate auto fare : Rs.70

There are villages two kilometres from SrivanchiYam named Papannaicherry and Thenenjar.

Temples of Historical and Religious importance near Srivanchiyam

- Adhipureeswar temple in Sukkravarakattalai (situated to the east of Vanchinadhar temple)
- Narayanapureeswar temple in Narayananamgalam (situated to the west of Vanchinadhar temple on Kudavaasal road)
- Bakthavathsala perumal temple in Thirukkannamangai (situated to the south of Vanchinadhar temple on Manakkal-Ayyampettai to Tiruvarur Road)
- Somanadhar temple in Achyutamangalam (situated to the north of Vanchinadhar temple on Kumbakonam to Nannilam Road)
- Kothanda ramar temple in Adambar ( Situated to the North of Vanchinadhar temple on Achyutamangalm to Thengarai Road)
- Veezhinadha Swami temple in Thiruveezhimizhalai (situated to the North of Vanchinadhar temple - Near to Thengarai)
