= Thiruvenkadu =

- Village
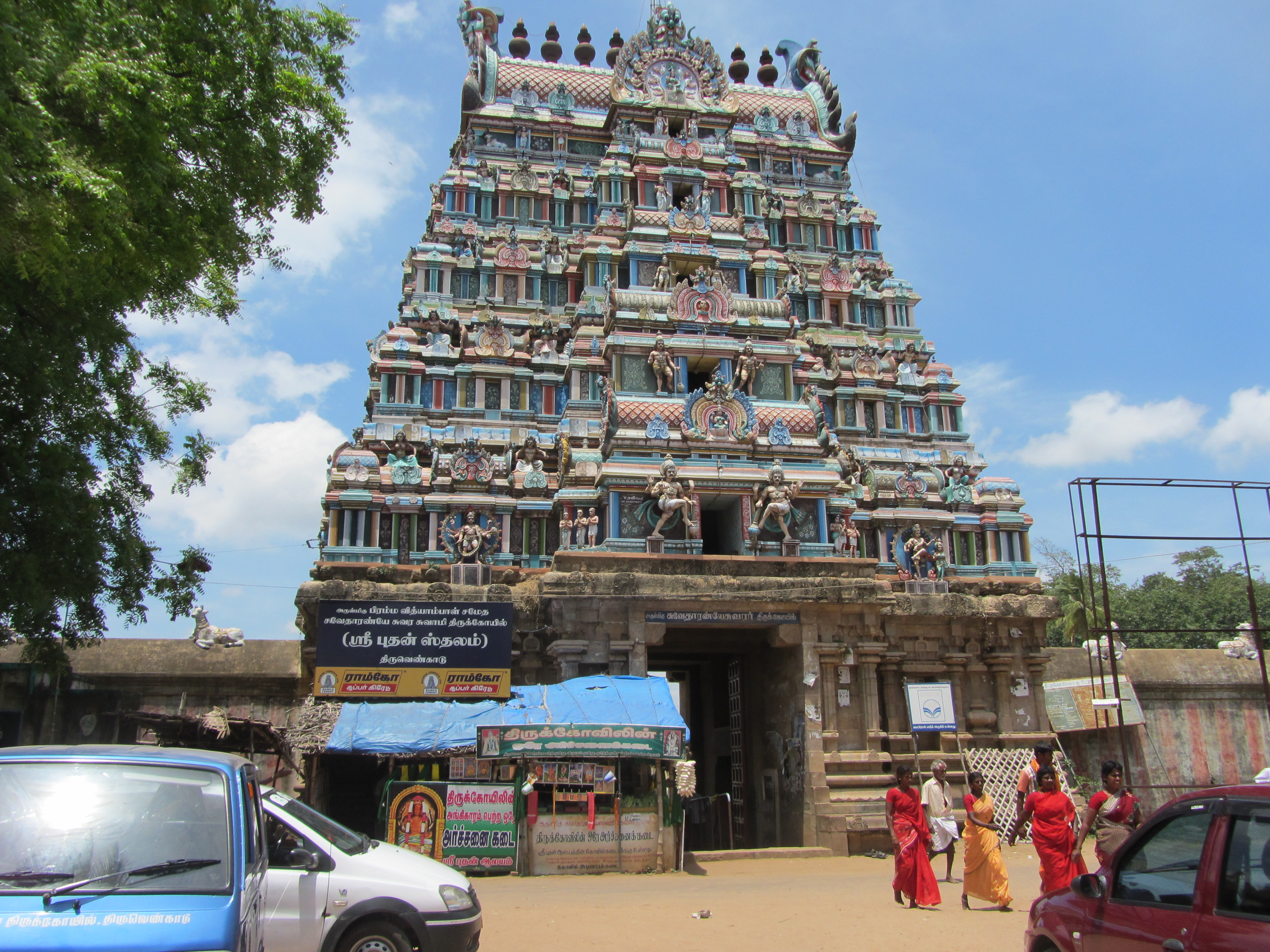
- Thiruvengadu temple
- Interactive map of Thiruvenkadu
- Location in Tamil Nadu, India
- Coordinates: 11.1737°N 79.8105°E
- Country: India
- State: Tamil Nadu
- District: Mayiladuthurai
- Mandal: Sirkazhi
- Seat: Thiruvenkadu Gram Panchayat

Government
  - Type: Panchayati raj

Languages
  - Official: Tamil
- Time zone: UTC+5:30 (IST)
- PIN: 609114
- Vehicle registration: TN

Thiruvenkadu (also spelled Thiruvengadu) is a village in Sirkazhi taluk of Mayiladuthurai district in the Indian state of Tamil Nadu. It is located 12 kilometres (7.5 mi) from the taluk headquarter, Sirkazhi. The village is also the birth place of Pattinathar, a saivite Tamil scholar and saint who attained salvation in Thirvotriyur near Chennai.

== Demographics ==
Thiruvenkadu has the population of 8252, of which males are just 4126 while females are 4126. The literacy rate of Thiruvenkadu, as per 2011 census is 82.89 per cent.

== Temples ==
Swetharanyeswarar Temple is a Hindu temple in Thiruvenkadu. The main deity is Swetharaneswarar (Shiva) but there is a separate sannidhi for Budhan (Mercury).
