= Thiruvidaimarudur =

- Town panchayat
- Nickname: Idavai
- Location in Tamil Nadu, India
- Coordinates: 10.98°N 79.47°E
- Country: India
- State: Tamil Nadu
- District: Thanjavur
- Elevation: 20 m (66 ft)

Population (2001)
  - Total: 13,758

Languages
  - Official: Tamil
- Time zone: UTC+5:30 (IST)
- PIN: 612104
- Telephone code: 0435
- Vehicle registration: TN.68

Thiruvidaimarudur (also spelt as Thiruvidaimaradur or Tiruvidaimarudur) is a panchayat town in Thanjavur district, in the Indian state of Tamil Nadu. The town is notable for its Mahalingeshwarar Temple, a Hindu shrine for Lord Shiva.

== Geography ==
Tiruvidaimarudur is located at 10.98°N 79.47°E. It has an average elevation of 20 m (66 ft).

== Demographics ==
The 2001 Indian census recorded Thiruvidaimarudur as having a population of 13,758. Males and females each constituted 50% of the population. Thiruvidaimarudur has an average literacy rate of 74%, higher than the national average of 59.5%: male literacy is 80%, and female literacy is 68%. 11% of the town's population is under 6 years of age.

== Politics ==
Thiruvidaimarudur assembly constituency is part of Mayiladuthurai (Lok Sabha constituency). Govi. Chezhiyan is the current MLA of Thiruvidaimaruthur assembly constituency and the current MP of Mayiladuthurai Lok Sabha constituency S. Ramalingam is from Thiruvidaimaruthur.

== The temple ==
Located about 9 km (5.6 mi) north-east of the temple city of Kumbakonam and serves as one of the Taluk headquarters in the Tanjore District. The region is known for its fertile soil, allowing farmers to harvest crops three times a year. On occasion, the waters of the Cauvery River enable a fourth harvest.

Tiruvidaimarudur (also known as madhyārjunam) is located on the banks of the Virasolanar River. It is home to the Mahalingeswarar Temple, where the deity Shiva is worshipped as Mahalingeswara Swami (in Sanskrit, mahā-lingeśvara svāmi, meaning "the great lord of the lingam"), represented by a lingam known as jothimayalingam (in Tamil, ஜோதிமயலிங்கம், jōthimaya liṅgam, meaning "lingam of radiant light"). The goddess of the temple is Brihad Sundara Gujambal (perunala mamulai ammai). The lingam is “believed to be the focal point for the seven consorts of Shiva.”

The temple’s Nandi, one of the largest in the district, is notable for not being carved from a single stone, which is why it does not surpass the weight of the Nandi at the Brihadeeswarar Temple in Thanjavur, despite being larger in size. There is also a separate sanctum (sannidhi) for Mookambikai (in Tamil, மூகாம்பிகை, mūkāmbikai) with a Maha Meru (in Sanskrit, mahāmeru, meaning "great sacred mountain").

Two major temple festivals are celebrated annually at the Mahalingeswarar Temple. The first, Thaipusam (in Tamil, தைப்பூசம், celebrated during the Tamil month of Thai [January–February]), and the second, Thirukkalyana Utsavam (in Tamil, திருக்கல்யாண உற்சவம், tirukkaḷyāṇa uṟcavam, meaning "divine wedding festival") or Vasantha Utsavam (vasanta utsava, meaning "spring festival"), is observed in the Tamil month of Vaigasi (May). Other significant festivals include the 63 Nayanmar Ula (in Tamil, நாயன்மார் உலா, a procession honouring the 63 Shaivite saints) and Arudra Darisanam (ārdrā darśana, meaning "sacred sight of Lord Shiva on the Ārdra star day"), similar to the celebration in Chidambaram.

The temple is also known for its 27 star lingas, the idol of the prince Ammani Ammal (in Tamil, அம்மணி அம்மாள், meaning "beloved mother"), and the Chitra prakaram (citra-prākāra, meaning "painted enclosure" or precincts of the temple), which is adorned with extensive paintings. Additionally, there are several charitable trusts associated with the temple, one of which is the Pachaiyappa Mudaliar Arakattalai (பச்சையப்ப முதலியார் அறக்கட்டளை).

== Notable people ==
Tiruvidaimarudur is the birthplace of the Hindu Saint Pattinathar - in the medieval period - whose lyrics are renowned for realizing self in the Tamil Saiva tradition of Hinduism.

It is also the birthplace of the Carnatic music flautist T. R. Mahalingam.

The family of Amar Singh, who was deposed from the throne of Thanjavur in 1798, resides here.

== See also ==
- Vannakkudi
- Chinnakadaistreet
- Thiruppudaimarudur
