= Mahamaham stampede =

1992 crowd crush in Tamil Nadu, India

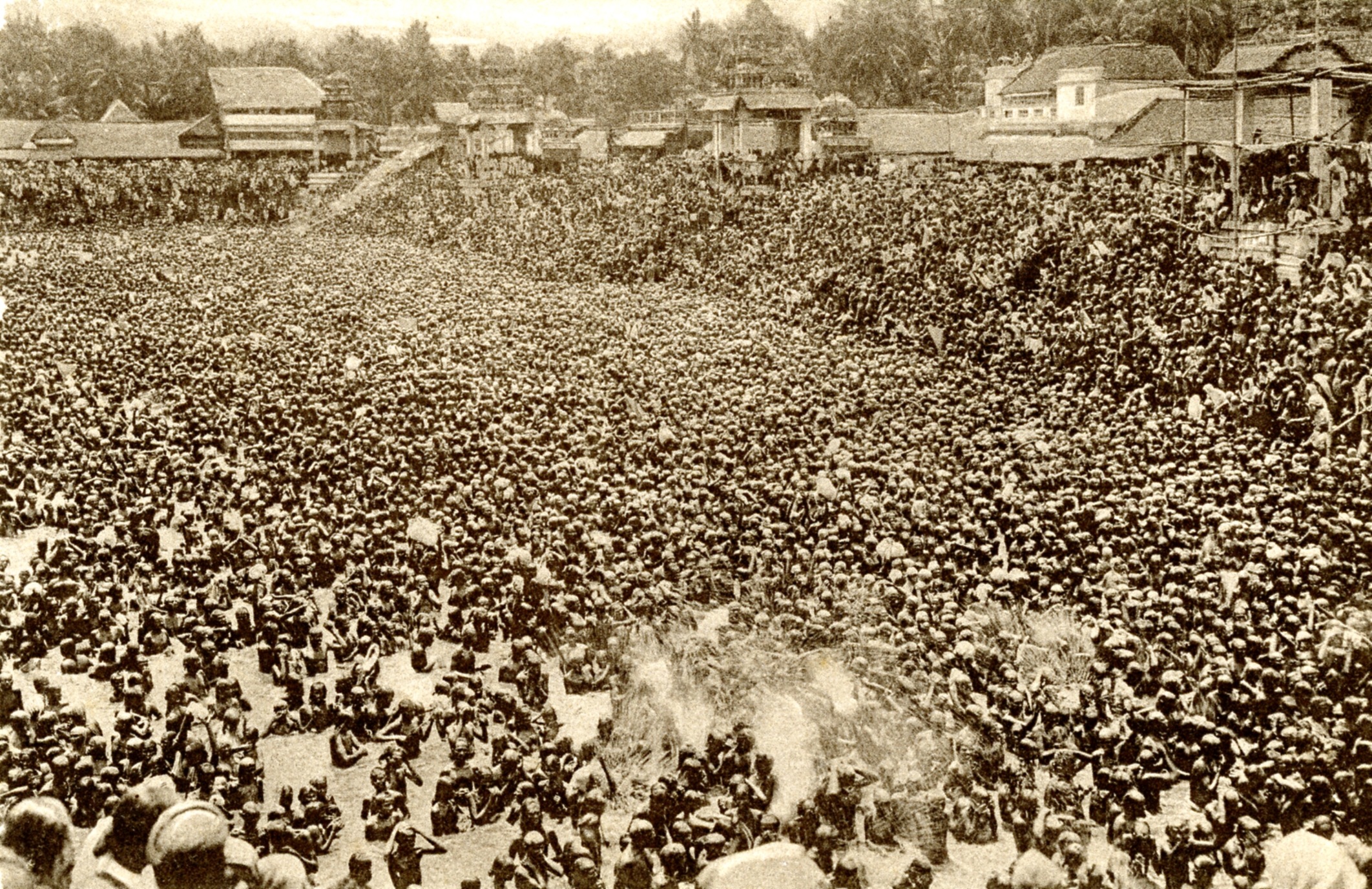
- A file picture of Mahamham festival
- Date: 18 February 1992
- Time: c. 12:15 p.m. (IST)
- Location: Mahamaham tank, Kumbakonam, Tamil Nadu, India
- Type: Crowd crush and Crowd collapse
- Cause: Overcrowding, Structural integrity and failure, Lathi charge
- Organized by: Jayalalithaa led Tamil Nadu government
- Deaths: 50
- Injuries: 74

The Mahamaham stampede was a crowd crush disaster that occurred during the Mahamaham festival on 18 February 1992, around Mahamaham tank located in the town of Kumbakonam in the South Indian state of Tamil Nadu. An estimated 50 people were killed in the crush that left another 74 injured. The crush was triggered by mismanagement of large number of people visiting the festival, which was also attended by the then Chief Minister of Tamil Nadu, Jayalalithaa, who had a holy dip in the tank.

== Background ==
The Tank is located in the heart of Kumbakonam town. It covers an area of 6.2 acres and is trapezoidal in shape. The tank is surrounded by 16 small Mandapams (shrines) and has 21 wells inside the tank. The names of the wells carry the name of Hindu god Shiva or that of Rivers of India. Govinda Dikshitar, the chieftain of Ragunatha Nayak of Thanjavur, constructed the sixteen Mandapams and stone steps around this tank. Masimaham is an annual event that occurs in the Tamil month of Masi (February–March) in the star of Magam. Once in twelve years, when the planet Guru (Jupiter) enters the sign Siṃha (Leo), the Kumbh mela festival of South India is celebrated at Mahamaham tank. Vast crowds gather at Kumbakonam to have a dip in the tank, along with saints and philosophers. All the rivers of India are believed to meet at the tank on this day and a purificatory bath at this tank on this day is considered equal to the combined dips in all the holy rivers of India Festival deities from all the temples in Kumbakonam arrive at the tank and at noon, all the deities bathe along with the devotees - it is called "Theerthavari". The purificatory bath is believed to remove sins and after the dip, pilgrims offer charitable gifts in the hope of being rewarded in the current life and subsequent lives. The temple cars of major temples in Kumbakonam come around the city on the festival night. During the Mahamaham of 1992, the number of devotees reached 1 million.

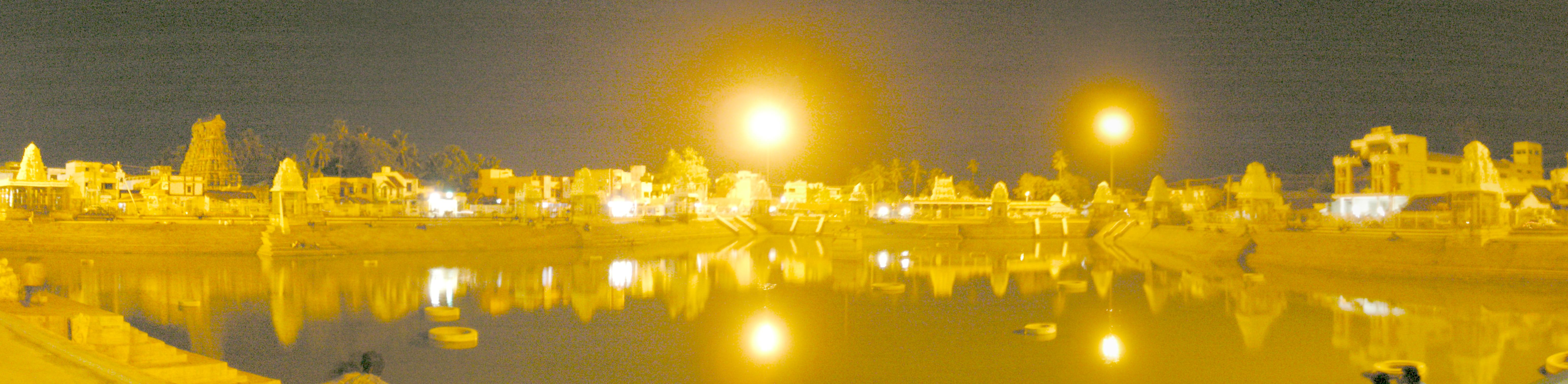
Night view of the Mahamaham tank

== Stampede ==
On 18 February 1992, the then chief minister of Tamil Nadu, Jayalalithaa and her friend Sasikala had a holy dip in the tank at around 12:15 p.m. The proceeds were initiated by the Shankaracharya of Kanchi Mutt, Jayendra Saraswati. Tens of thousands of pilgrims had gathered, both for the holy dip and to witness the presence of the Chief Minister.

=== Conflicting causes ===
There are conflicting reports on the cause of the stampede, according to official government statements released at the time, the stampede occurred due to the collapse of a grill and pillars on the northern bank of the tank, part of the Bangur Dharmashala compound. The enormous pressure of the crowd led to the collapse of this concrete superstructure, reportedly killing 15 people under the rubble, while others were crushed in the stampede while trying to flee as reported by the Press Trust of India. Of the killed, 30 were reported to be women, three were children and the rest were men. Some of the newspapers reported the stampede took place soon after the chief minister reached the tank. This is attributed by the fact that the stampede occurred 200 metres away from the special bathing ghat arranged for the chief minister. The whole accident occurred within a span of 5 minutes with pilgrims rushing up for a holy dip in auspicious time, and also for viewing the chief minister as reported by The Hindu on 19 February. Most newspapers also reported that the western and southern sides were cordoned off for security purposes and people could enter and exit only through the northern and eastern sides. Walter Devaram, the inspector-general of police is quoted as saying "a concrete superstructure of a building on the northern bank of the bank collapsed under the weight of those standing on it to watch the festival". The final official number of victims stood at 50 with another 74 getting injured.

However, contemporary and retrospective reporting by The Hindu and eyewitness accounts provide a different perspective. The Hindu reported on 19 February 1992 that the stampede began 200 metres from a special bathing ghat set up for Chief Minister Jayalalithaa. Security arrangements for the Chief Minister had led to traditional exit routes being blocked: the eastern bank (where the CM bathed) had no exit, and much of the southern bank was cordoned off due to her convoy. As a result, the massive crowd entering through the northern and eastern banks had no viable exit routes, leading to dangerous overcrowding.

A police barricade was placed near the Alamara Vinayagar Temple and the Navakanyamandapam on the northern bank. When pilgrims attempted to exit the overcrowded tank, they were prevented from moving in any direction by barricades. At this time, the police allegedly used lathis (batons) on the surging crowd, causing panic. A large section of the crowd attempted to scale an iron grill, which collapsed, adding to the chaos. Victims were trampled or suffocated, and according to some reports, several drowned in the tank contradicting official claims that no deaths were due to drowning. In his 2024 memoir Munnar to Marina: The Journey, W.I. Davaram, then Inspector-General of Police (Law and Order), wrote that the tragedy was caused by the hasty descent of people from the northern bank, which was both an entry and an unauthorized exit point due to blockages elsewhere. This resulted in people entering and exiting the tank colliding, creating a bottleneck and chaos.

== Aftermath ==
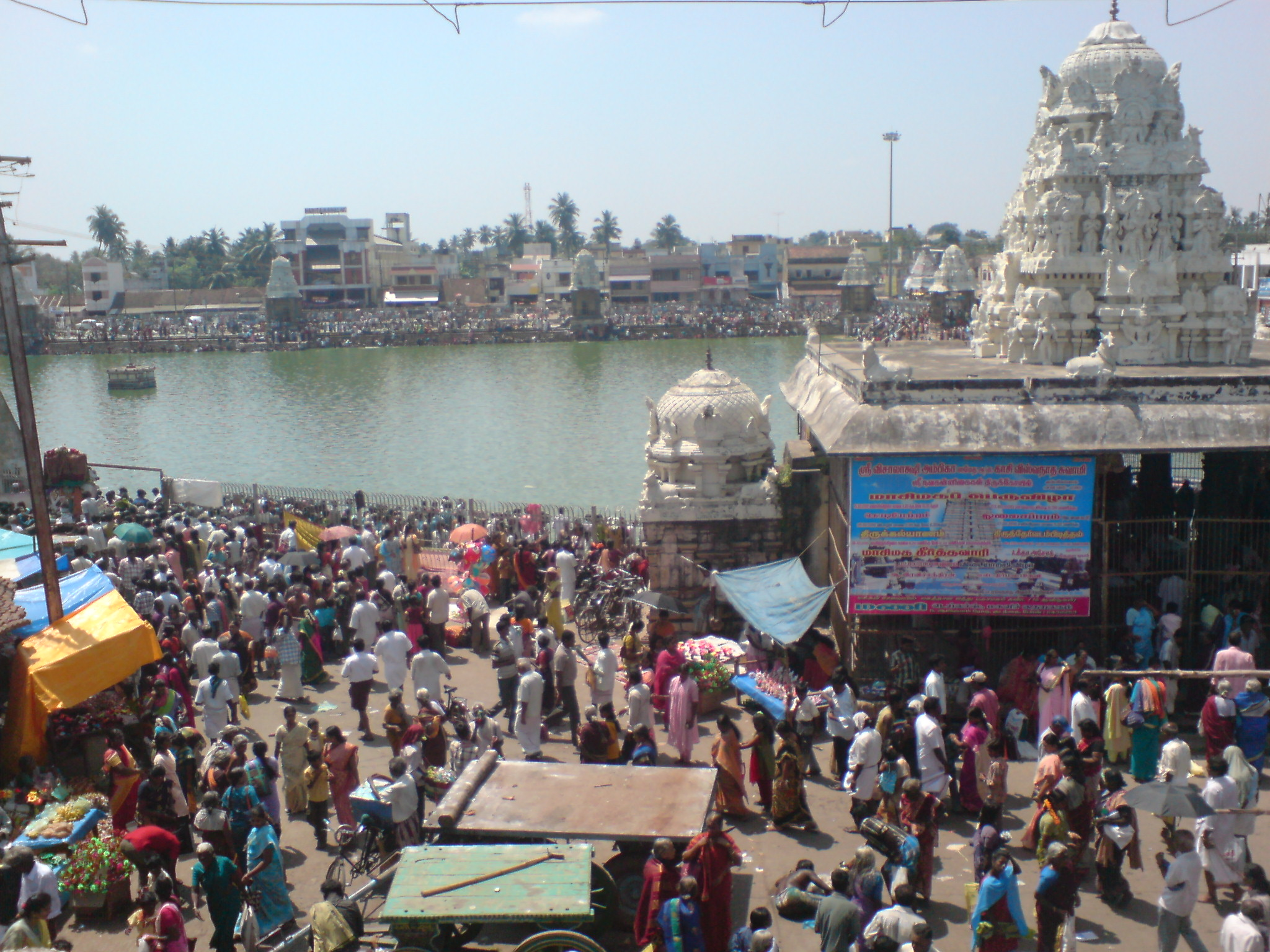
File picture of yearly Masimaham festival

The Government of Tamil Nadu announced a compensation of one lakh (100,000) rupees for the deceased, which included a sum of 30,000 rupees given by the All India Anna Dravida Munnetra Kazhagam party that ruled the state that time. It was widely criticised by the media that a government announcement was made together with a party announcement.

On 18 February, after much demands for a judicial enquiry, the Government of Tamil Nadu announced a magisterial enquiry with the additional collector heading it. On 20 February, the government issued a detailed press note indicating

- the arrangements for the 1992 festival were the same as that of 1968 and 1980. The entry of pilgrims were allowed from the northern and southern sides and exits from the eastern and western sides.
- that "the unfortunate situation developed when a grill over the compound wall abutting the Bangur Dharmashala and the pillars collapsed on the northern tank owing to the enormous pressure of people who had assembled on both sides of the compound wall".
- that the Bangur Dharmashala was used by Vishwa Hindu Parishad, a Hindu party, as a clinic and for distributing food packets.
- that the food packets were thrown out to the pilgrims, resulting in the initiation of the crowd causing the grill and concrete to break, resulting in the stampede.
- that there was not a single death due to drowning in the tank
- that the allegation that the stampede occurred on account of lathicharge was totally baseless as no lathi charge was made throughout the festival.
- that the incident took place at 1:00 p.m. long after the chief minister left the place at around 12:15 p.m.
- that the chief minister's enclosure was very small one being 20' X 12' and the newspaper reports of lathicharge on people eagerly viewing the chief minister leading to stampede is malicious.
- finally the Vishwa Hindu Parishad was making unfounded allegations as it wanted to take credit of the smooth conduct of the festival.

== 2004 event ==
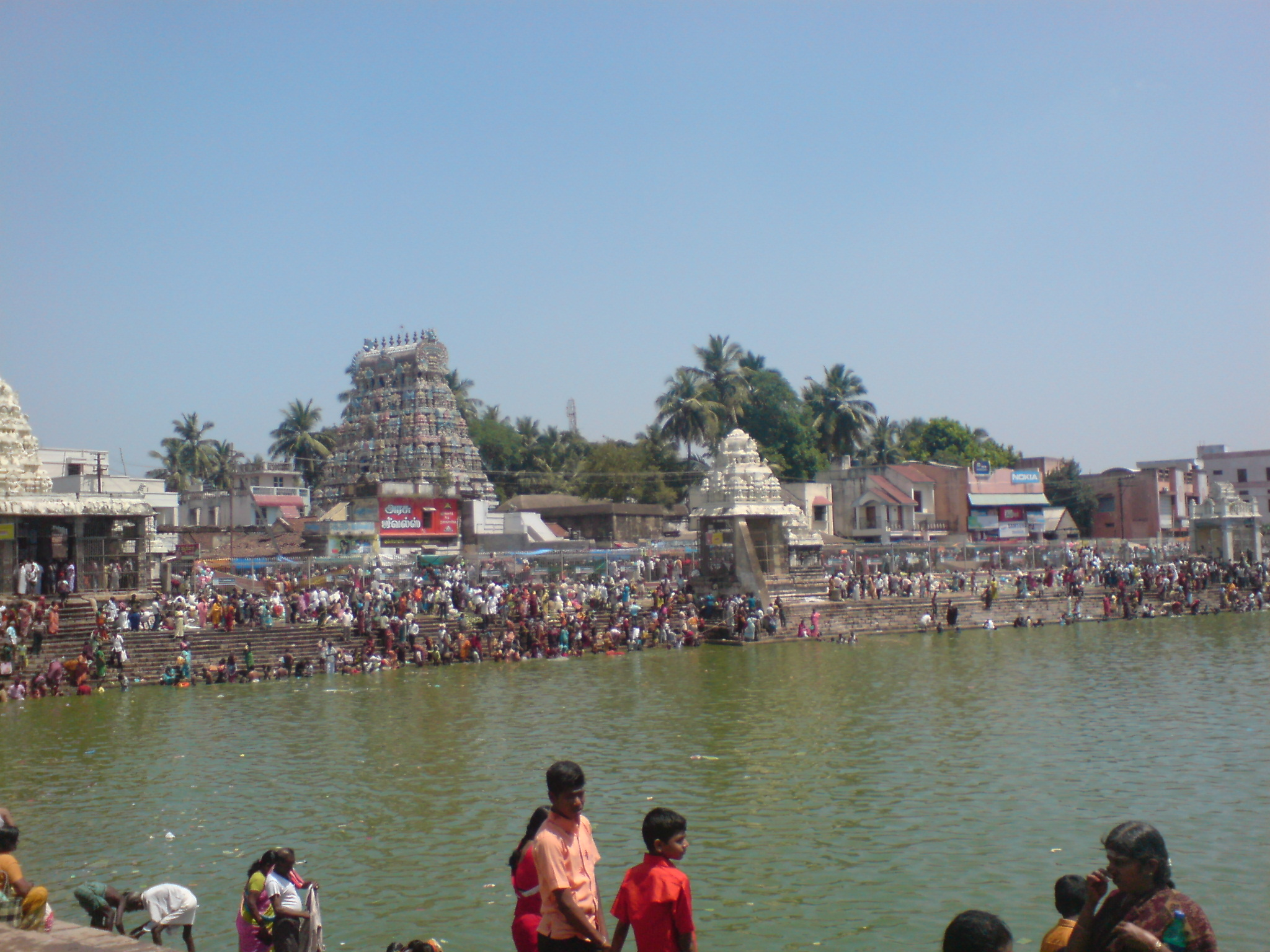
A section of tank during Masimagam festival

The Mahamaham event of 2004 passed off without any mishaps. The state government spent nearly 50 crores (Rs500 million) for developing the local infrastructure of Kumbakonam. It included 88 lakhs (Rs8.8 million) sanctioned for carrying out public health measures and sanitary arrangements 21 shutter gates were set up at the approaches to the tank and the exits were clearly identified. Closed circuit surveillance television was employed for video surveillance and crowd control. Tamil Nadu Police employed closed to 20,000 security personnel for the estimated 20 lakh visitors. The festivities were spaced out to 10 days to allow pilgrims to take sacred bath from day one. Around 3000 railway police personnel were employed for the 17 Feb function. Southern railways operated additional trains via Kumbakonam in the new broad gauge converted railway lines from Villupuram to Kumbakonam. Around 5-6 lakh railway travel tickets were sold for the event compared to the 1.5 lakh for the 1992 event. In the aftermath felicitation event held on 30 March in Trichy, the retired Deputy General of Police, Walter Davaram was quoted as saying "I take moral responsibility for the fiasco during the mahamaham held in 1992. But I must say that these police officials have done a much better job than that during my time,". He also insisted on documenting the event proceedings that involved meticulous planning and execution of security arrangements. Doordarshan, the national television channel, telecast the event live for the first time. Keeping the eventualities in mind, Jayalalithaa, the chief minister during the 2004 festival also, stayed away from the function.

== See also ==
- 2004 Kumbakonam School Fire
- Crowd collapses and crushes
- List of fatal crowd crushes
- Stampede#Human stampedes and crushes
