= Srirangam marriage hall fire =

2004 fire in India

2004 Srirangam Marriage hall fire
- Date: 23 January 2004
- Location: Srirangam, Tamil Nadu, India; 10°51′18″N 78°41′29″E
- Deaths: 64
- Injuries: 33

The 2004 Srirangam marriage hall fire was a fire that happened on 23 January 2004 during a Hindu wedding at Padmapriya Marriage Hall in Srirangam, a town in the South Indian state of Tamil Nadu. A day after the accident, there were 42 victims, but a total of 64 people, including the groom, were killed overall and 33 others were injured in the fire. The reason for the fire was found out to be a short circuit in the electric wire connecting a video camera, which lit up the temporary thatched roof set up in the first level of the hall.

The fire is counted as one of four major blazes in the state, along with the Erwadi fire incident on 6 August 2001 that killed 30 mentally challenged people, the Brihadeeswarar Temple fire on 7 June 1997 in which 48 people were killed and the 2004 Kumbakonam School fire that killed 94 school children. Chief Minister J. Jayalalithaa announced a cash relief of ₹50,000 (equivalent to ₹180,000 or US$1,800 in 2023) to the families of the deceased from the Chief Minister's Relief Fund, ₹15,000 (equivalent to ₹53,000 or US$550 in 2023) to people with heavy injuries and ₹6,000 (equivalent to ₹21,000 or US$220 in 2023) to those with minor injuries.

The case was fought in the Principal District Court of Tiruchirapalli. On 14 June 2012, the judge sentenced Ramasamy (65), owner of the wedding hall, to two years rigorous imprisonment and ordered to pay a compensation of ₹50,000 each to the dependents of the victims and ₹10,000 (equivalent to ₹35,000 or US$370 in 2023) each to those injured in the accident. Selvam, the thatch roof contractor, one of the six accused, died before the judgement. Dharmaraj, the videographer was sentenced to one year rigorous imprisonment, Sadagopan, the hall manager, to one year imprisonment and Murugesan, the electrician, to six months imprisonment. The sentence of photographer Dharmaraj was reduced to 6 months by Madras High Court on 10 June 2020 which also ordered disbursement of ₹40 lakh (equivalent to ₹47 lakh or US$49,000 in 2023) to the victims.

== Fire ==
The day of the marriage, 23 January 2004, was a Friday, which was considered auspicious as per Hindu custom. The marriage was celebrated in Padmapriya Marriage Hall, located in EV Srinivasachari Road in Srirangam. The groom, Gururajan (40), was an employee of an insurance company and the bride Jayasri Ramanathan, was a school teacher. Since the crowd was large, the venue of the marriage was shifted to a makeshift open area on the first level of the hall that had a thatched roof.

The fire spread at around 9:15 in the morning quickly to the makeshift stage, thatched roof, plastic chairs and clothing material, killing 30 people on the spot. The thatched roof fell on the visitors and the smoke engulfed in the hall masked the exit routes. It was reported that the victims fell over a handicapped person who was trying to escape. Fire personnel from Srirangam and Tiruchirappalli tried to doze off the fire, along with the support of locals.

The injured people were admitted in the Srirangam Government Hospital and KAP Viswananathan Hospital in Tiruchirappalli. A total of 57 people were killed in the fire and 50 others were injured. The reason of the fire, based on the account of initial eyewitnesses was found out to be a short circuit initiated by a video camera which lit up the temporary thatched low roof set up on the first level of the hall. The people killed included the bridegroom Gururajan (40), 20 women and four children, three of whom were girls under the age of 10. The bride Jayasri (32) sustained brutal injuries. After the fire, burnt flesh, utensils and belongings of the visitors laid all over the place. The rescue operations were overseen by the then Collector of Tiruchirapalli, K. Manivasan, the Inspector-General of Police, S. George, the range DIG and City Police Commissioner, Sunil Kumar Singh. Most of the victims killed on the spot were the colleagues of the groom.

== Enquiry ==
The initial investigation by police found the possible reason for the fire to be a short circuit of the wire connecting the videographer's equipment. The Inspector-General of Police, Central Zone, S. George, informed the media that the low-hanging decorative material probably caught fire owing to the intense heat generated by the video flashgun. He pointed out that temporary power lines to the unauthorised makeshift thatch were the major reasons of the fire. The building, constructed as a residential building, was illegally converted into a hall.

The police recovered the videocassette from the videographer who recorded the marriage. There were four arrests that included the hall manager S. Sadagopan, video light boy R. Balaji, electrician K. Murugesan, and thatch contractor M. Selvam. They were booked under Section 304A of the Indian Penal Code (IPC) on criminal negligence. The enquiry was headed by an officer of the rank of Additional Superintendent of Police. The investigations also revealed that the stampede was on account of the narrow staircase that was just 2.5 ft (0.76 m) wide and served as the only passage.

The case was fought in the Principal District Court of Tiruchirapalli. On 14 June 2012, the judge sentenced Ramasamy (65), the owner of the wedding hall to two years rigorous imprisonment. He was also ordered to pay a compensation of ₹50,000 (equivalent to ₹180,000 or US$1,800 in 2023) each to the dependants of the victims and ₹10,000 (equivalent to ₹35,000 or US$370 in 2023) each to those injured in the fire. Selvam, the thatch roof contractor, one of the six accused, died before the judgement. Dharmaraj, the videographer, was sentenced to one year rigorous imprisonment, Sadagopan to one year imprisonment and Murugesan to six months imprisonment.

Dharmaraj, Ramaswamy, Sadagopan and Murugesan challenged the order of the sessions court in the High Court bench at Madurai which upheld the punishment of all leaving Dharmaraj, whose sentence was reduced to 6 month imprisonment on 10 June 2020 which also ordered disbursement of ₹40 lakh (equivalent to ₹47 lakh or US$49,000 in 2023) to the victims.

== Aftermath ==
The funeral of the 42 killed in the fire was performed on 24 January 2004 on the banks of river Kaveri. Fourteen families attended the funeral. The ghat, which had a capacity to accommodate three funerals at a time, was expanded to have more funerals at the same time. The bride, Jayashri suffered depression on account of the event.

The fire is counted as one of four major blazes in the state, along with the Erwadi fire incident on 6 August 2001 that killed 30 mentally challenged people, Brihadeeswarar Temple fire on 7 June 1997 in which 48 people were killed and 2004 Kumbakonam School fire that killed 94 school children. The Director of Fire and Rescue Service indicated that the department would conduct minimum safety standard check on all marriage halls in the state. Chief Minister Jayalalithaa announced a cash relief of ₹50,000 each to the families of the deceased from the Chief Minister's Relief Fund, ₹40 lakh (equivalent to ₹47 lakh or US$49,000 in 2023) to people with heavy injuries and ₹6,000 (equivalent to ₹21,000 or US$220 in 2023) to those with minor injuries.

== Timeline ==
- 23 January 2004 - Fire accident in a marriage hall in Srirangam where 42 were killed.
- 24 January 2004 - Funeral performed for all 42 killed in the accident in the banks of river Kaveri.
- 14 June 2012 - Ramasamy (65), the owner of the wedding hall to two years rigorous imprisonment. He was also ordered to pay a compensation of ₹50,000 each to the dependants of the victims and ₹10,000 each to those injured in the accident. Selvam, the thatch roof contractor, one of the six accused, died before the judgement. Dharmaraj, the videographer, was sentenced to one year rigorous imprisonment, Sadagopan to one year imprisonment and Murugesan to six months imprisonment.
- 10 June 2020 - A bench of Madras High Court in Madurai upholds the sentence of three and reduces the sentence of the photographer.

== See also ==
- 2023 Qaraqosh wedding fire
