= Brahmanandeesvarar Temple, Patteeswaram =

Shiva temple in Tamil Nadu, India

Brahmanandeesvarar Temple

Religion
- Affiliation: Hinduism
- District: Tiruvarur
- Deity: Lord Shiva

Location
- Location: Patteeswaram
- State: Tamil Nadu
- Country: India

Architecture
- Type: Dravidian architecture

Brahmanandeesvarar Temple is a Hindu temple dedicated to the deity Shiva, located at Patteeswaram in the Thanjavur district, Tamil Nadu, India.

== Location ==
This temple is located near Patteeswaram, at a distance of 500 m. from Thirumalairajan River. From the north street of Thenupuriswarar Temple this temple can be reached, through west. The entrance having an arch is found there. This temple is made of bricks.

== Presiding deity ==
The presiding deity in the garbhagriha, represented by the lingam, is known as Brahmanandeesvarar and the goddess is known as Brahmambikai. After crossing the dilapidated walls a big front mandapa. Next to the mandapa in the garbhagriha, the presiding deity is found in 4' x 4' size (10 x 10 cm). This is the biggest lingam found in this area. The goddess is facing south.

== Specialities ==
The temple belongs to 8th century CE. This temple, was offered with many grants by Alisi Kattatigal, the wife of the Chola king Aditya I. When the glory of Chola kings started to decline, Vijayalaya Chola took the rein and upheld the prestige. After his rule, Aditya came to the throne. Like Vijayala Chola he contributed much. He worshipped the presiding deity of the temple. From the inscriptions found in the temple it is learnt that he donated for lighting the lamps temple. From the existing structure it is surmised that there should have been a three tier raja gopura in this temple.

== Structure ==
Sculptures from 10th and 11th century CE are located around the temple. Among others they include Dakshinamurthy, Lingodbhava, Durga and Brahma. Brahma and Nāga kanni worshipped the presiding deity of the temple. Those who are affected by the curse of Naga are doing parikara here. Dakshinamurthy is facing south. The front mandapa is found with dwitala garbhagriha. After stepping some steps the garbhagriha could be reached. Naga kanni is found, in the kosta, in sitting posture. This is one of the beautiful sculptures of the temple.

== Renovation ==
Renovation work is going on in the temple. This temple is under the supervision of Hindu Religious & Charitable Endowments Department and Department of Archaeology, Government of Tamil Nadu. Arrangements are made for the renovation of the temple with the help of devotees. Pujas are held with their cooperation. This temple awaits for having a new look.
