= Brihadeeswarar temple fire =

1997 fire in India

1997 Brihadeeswarar Temple fire
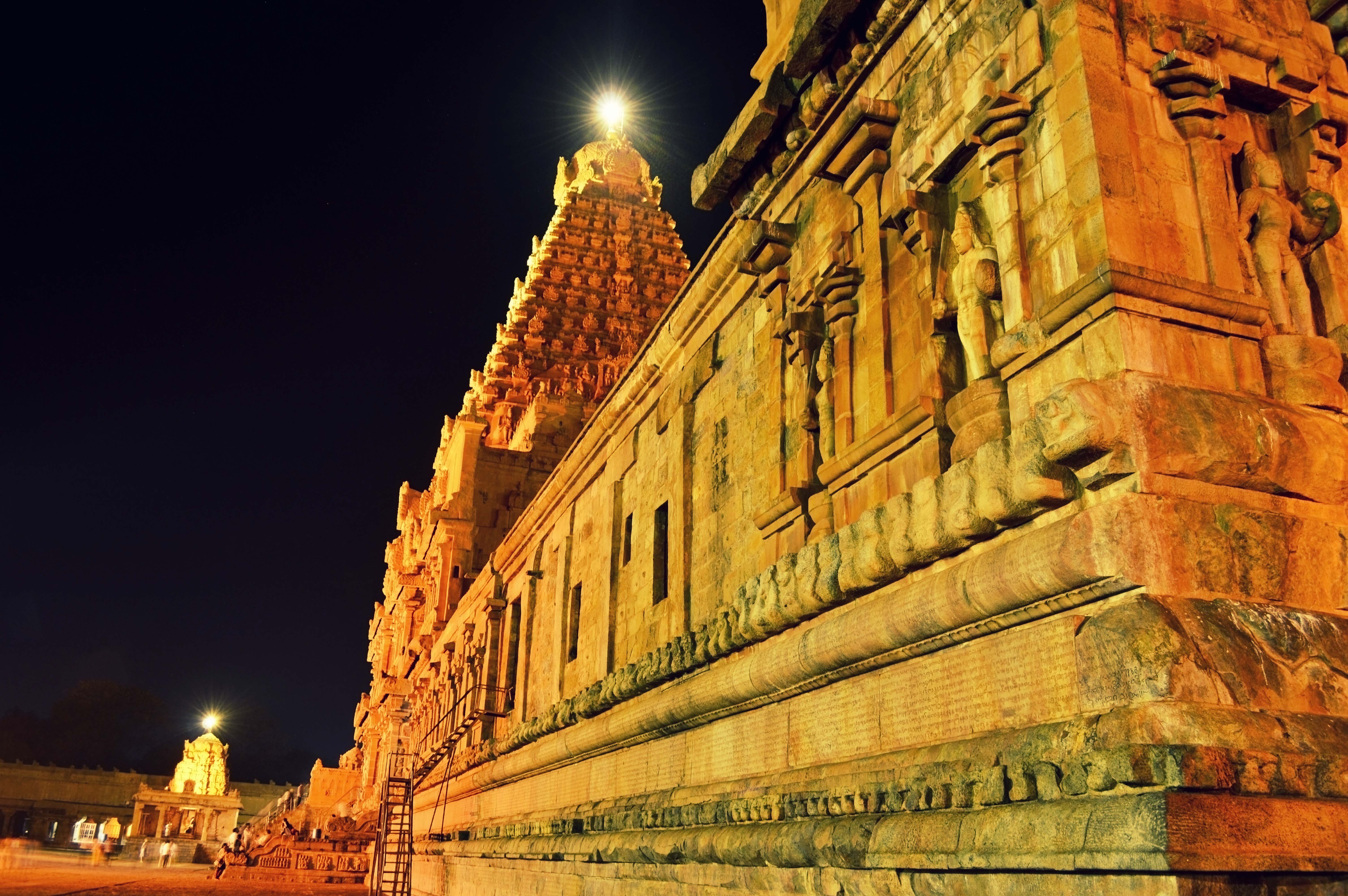
- Brihadeeswarar Temple, Thanjavur
- Date: 7 June 1997
- Location: Thanjavur, Tamil Nadu, India; 10°46′58″N 79°07′54″E
- Deaths: 48
- Injuries: 200

A fire accident occurred during the consecration of the Brihadeeswarar Temple on 7 June 1997 in Thanjavur, Tamil Nadu, India. A fire cracker lit near the temple fell on the yajnashala, a temporary structure built to accommodate the ritual ceremonies, and sparked the fire that spread to the thatched roofs. A stampede resulted when the panic-stricken devotees rushed the only entrance to the temple on the eastern side, killing 48 people and injuring more than 200.

The rescue operations were monitored by Pulavar Senguttuvan, the state Minister for Hindu Religious and Charitable Endowments, T N Ramanathan, the District Collector, S K Dogra, the Deputy Inspector-General of Police and Jayanth Murali, Superintendent of Police of Thanjavur district at that time. The rescue operations were aided by Home Guards, members of Red Cross and the general public. The Tamil Nadu Government announced a compensation of Rs 100,000 to the families of the deceased and the injured were paid from Rs 10,000 to Rs 50,000 each.

== Background ==
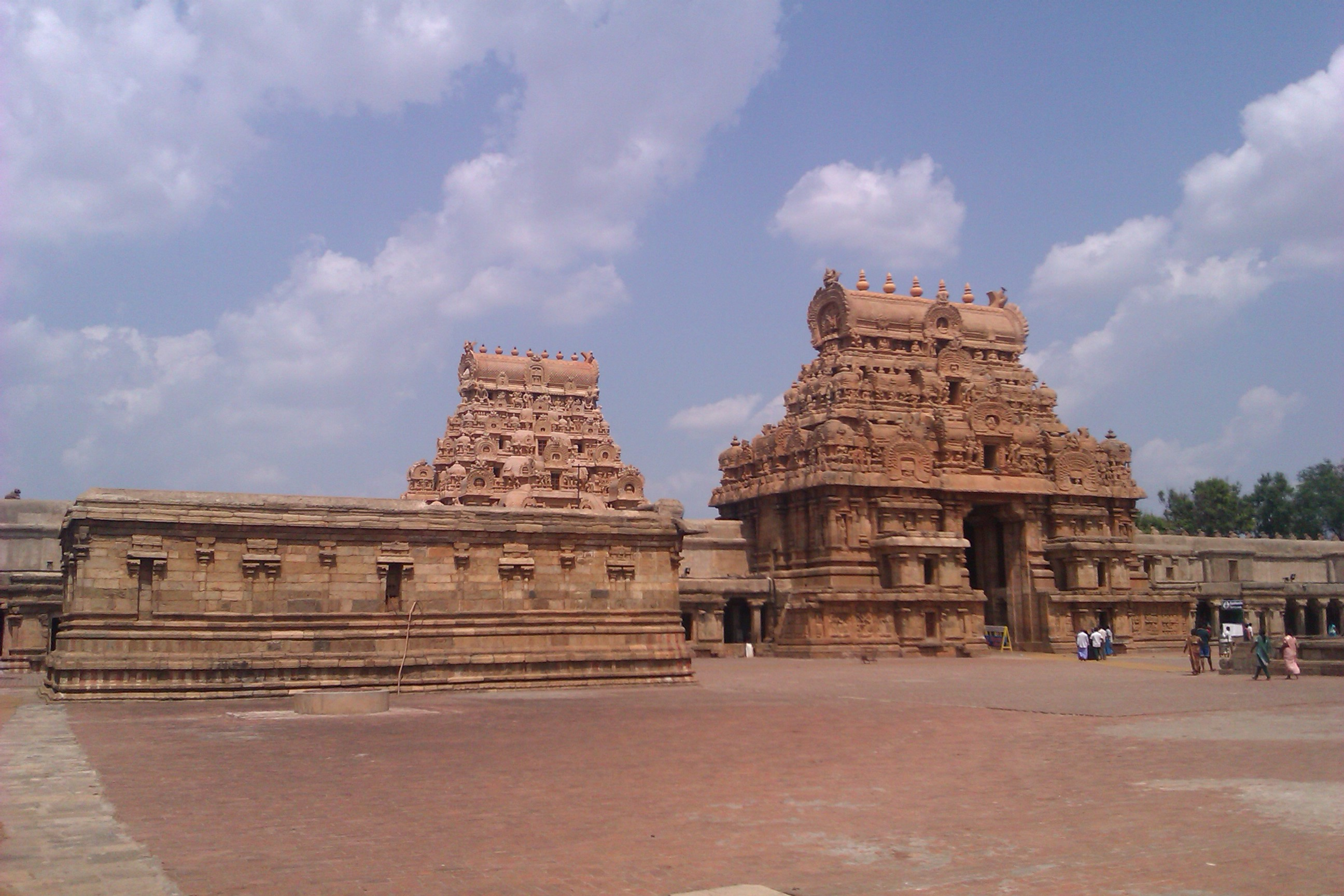
Entrance of the temple

Brihadeeswarar Temple, also called Peruvudaiyaar Kovil (lit. 'Big Temple'), is a Hindu temple dedicated to Shiva and built by Raja Raja Chola I in 1010 AD, in his capital city Thanjavur.

The temple is a UNESCO World Heritage Site and is one of the "Great Living Chola Temples". The vimana (or temple tower) is 216 ft high (66 m) and is among the tallest of its kind in the world. The Kumbam (Kalasha or Shikhar) Vimanam (apexex or the bulbous structure on the top) of the temple is carved out of a single stone and it weighs around 80 tons.

It is an architectural exemplar showcasing the pure form of the Dravida type of temple architecture and representative of the Chola Empire ideology and the Tamil civilisation in Southern India. The temple "testify to the brilliant achievements of the Chola in architecture, sculpture, painting and bronze casting."

== Fire ==
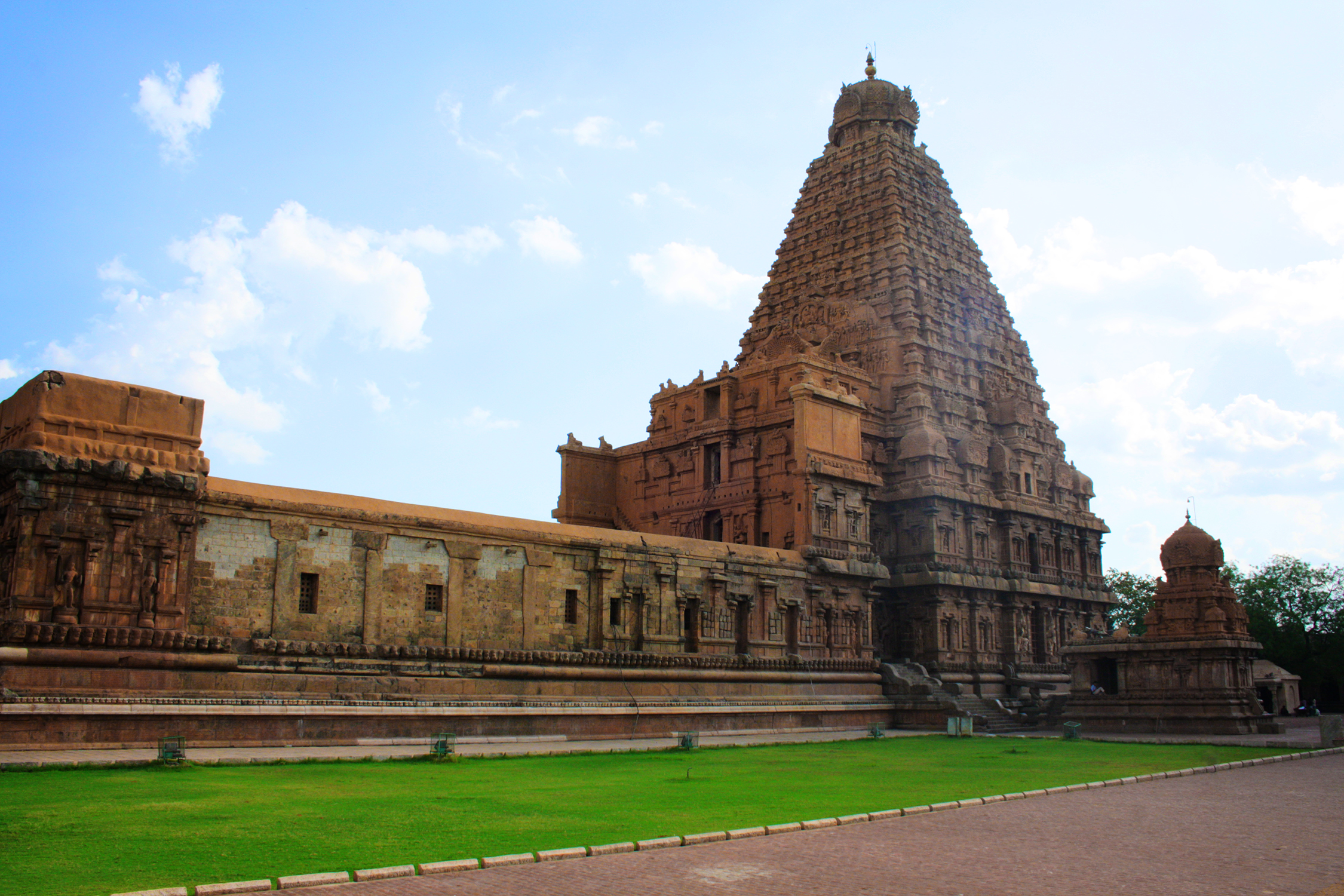
Brihadeeswarar Temple

During the consecration (Kumbhabhishekham) ceremony of 1997, 48 people were killed in a fire accident and 86 others injured. The incident occurred hours before the Mahakumbabishekam ceremony. It was reported that as many as 120 priests were performing the holy ceremonies in the temple. It is believed a fire cracker lit near the temple fell on the yagasala, a temporary structure built to accommodate the ritual ceremonies, and sparked the fire that spread to the thatched roofs. A stampede resulted when the panic-stricken devotees rushed to the only entrance to the temple on the eastern side. However, another version claimed the fire was caused by a spark from an electric generator.

Most of the deaths were caused by carbon monoxide poisoning, though a few were due to burn injuries. There was significant amounts of flammable materials like ghee and camphor (karpooram), which are used in religious ceremonies, condiments and thatched roof that resulted in spreading of fire. The only entrance was the narrow eastern side where many rushed and fell on stones. Police reported that they recovered 37 bodies from the thatched roof that fell on the worshipers. The fire hampered the electric line in the neighbourhood, slowing down the rescue operations.

The rescue operations were monitored by Pulavar Senguttuvan, the state Minister for Hindu Religious and Charitable Endowments, T N Ramanathan, the District Collector, S K Dogra, the Deputy Inspector-General of Police and Jayanth Murali, Superintendent of Police of Thanjavur district at that time. The rescue operations were aided by Home Guards, members of the Red Cross and the general public. A special information cell was opened in the premises of the temple and at the District Collector's office.

== Aftermath ==
The accident was one of four major fire accidents in the state along with the fire accidents like the Erwadi fire incident on 6 August 2001 that killed 30 mentally challenged people, fire at marriage hall on 23 January 2004 in Srirangam where 30 people including the bridegroom were killed and 2004 Kumbakonam School fire where 94 school children were killed.

The Tamil Nadu government announced a compensation of Rs 100,000 to the families of the deceased and the injured were paid from Rs 10,000 to Rs 50,000 each. The Deputy Inspector General (DGI), during the investigation, ruled out any possibility of sabotage even though an attempt was made to blast the TV relay station at Eswari Nagar the previous week.

== See also ==
- Crowd collapses and crushes – Type of disaster that occurs due to overcrowding
- Human stampede – A large group of people all try to get away from a perceived danger
- List of fatal crowd crushes
