= Kumbakonam =

- Municipal corporation
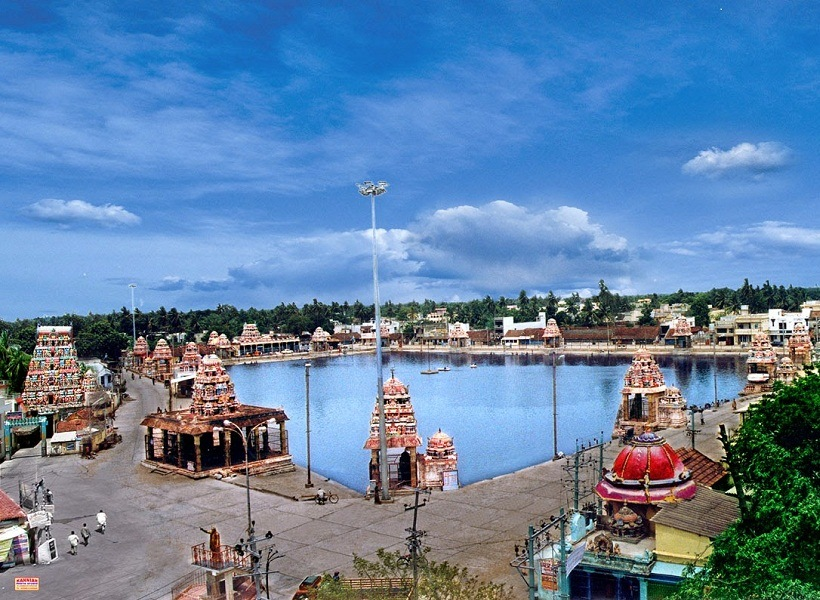
- Nickname(s): Temple city, Cambridge of South India
- Kumbakonam, Tamil Nadu Kumbakonam (India)
- Coordinates: 10.960200°N 79.384500°E
- Country: India
- State: Tamil Nadu
- District: Thanjavur District
- Region: Cauvery Delta

Government
  - Type: City Municipal Corporation
  - Body: Kumbakonam Municipal Corporation
  - Corporation Mayor: Saravanan (INC)

Area
  - Total: 42.95 km^{2} (16.58 sq mi)
- Elevation: 53 m (174 ft)

Population (2021)
  - Total: 140,156
  - Density: 3,263/km^{2} (8,452/sq mi)

Languages
  - Official: Tamil
- Time zone: UTC+5:30 (IST)
- PIN: 612001-6
- Telephone code: (91) 435
- Vehicle registration: TN 68

Kumbakonam (Note: Anglicised as Coombaconum or Combaconum) or Kudanthai is a city municipal corporation in the Thanjavur district, Tamil Nadu, India. Located 40 km (25 mi) from Thanjavur and 282 km (175 mi) from Chennai and it is the headquarters of the Kumbakonam taluk. It is the second-largest city in the district after Thanjavur and is bounded by two rivers: the Kaveri to the north and Arasalar to the south. Kumbakonam is known as temple city due to its high concentration of Hindu shrines and it hosts Mahamaham festival every 12 years, attracting pilgrims from all over the country.

Kumbakonam dates back to the Sangam period and was historically ruled by the Early Cholas, Pallavas, Mutharaiyars, Medieval Cholas, Later Cholas, Pandyas, the Vijayanagara Empire, the Madurai and Thanjavur Nayaks and the Thanjavur Marathas. It was the seat of medieval Cholas between the 7th and 8th centuries CE. During the British Raj, the city developed into a major center for Hindu scholarship and Western education, earning the name, the "Cambridge of South India". Kumbakonam was initially constituted as a municipality in 1866, it was upgraded to a municipal corporation on 24 August 2021 and comprises 48 wards.

== Etymology ==
The name Kumbakonam, roughly translated as "Pot's Corner", alludes to the mythical pot (kumbha) of the Hindu creator god Brahma, which contained the seeds of all living beings. The kumbha is traditionally believed to have been displaced during a pralaya (cosmic dissolution) and came to rest at the present site of the city. This traditional event is now commemorated in the Mahamaham festival held every 12 years. Historical records & classical texts refer to the town as Baskarashetram, Kumbam, and Kudanthai, while colonial records of British India spelled it as Coombaconum. It was formerly known in Tamil as Kudamukku and is identified with the Sangam-period settlement of Kudavayil.

== History ==
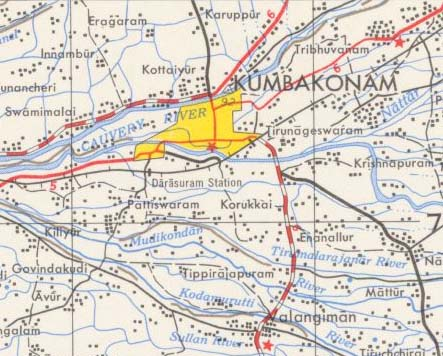
A 1955 map of Kumbakonam municipality and surrounding areas

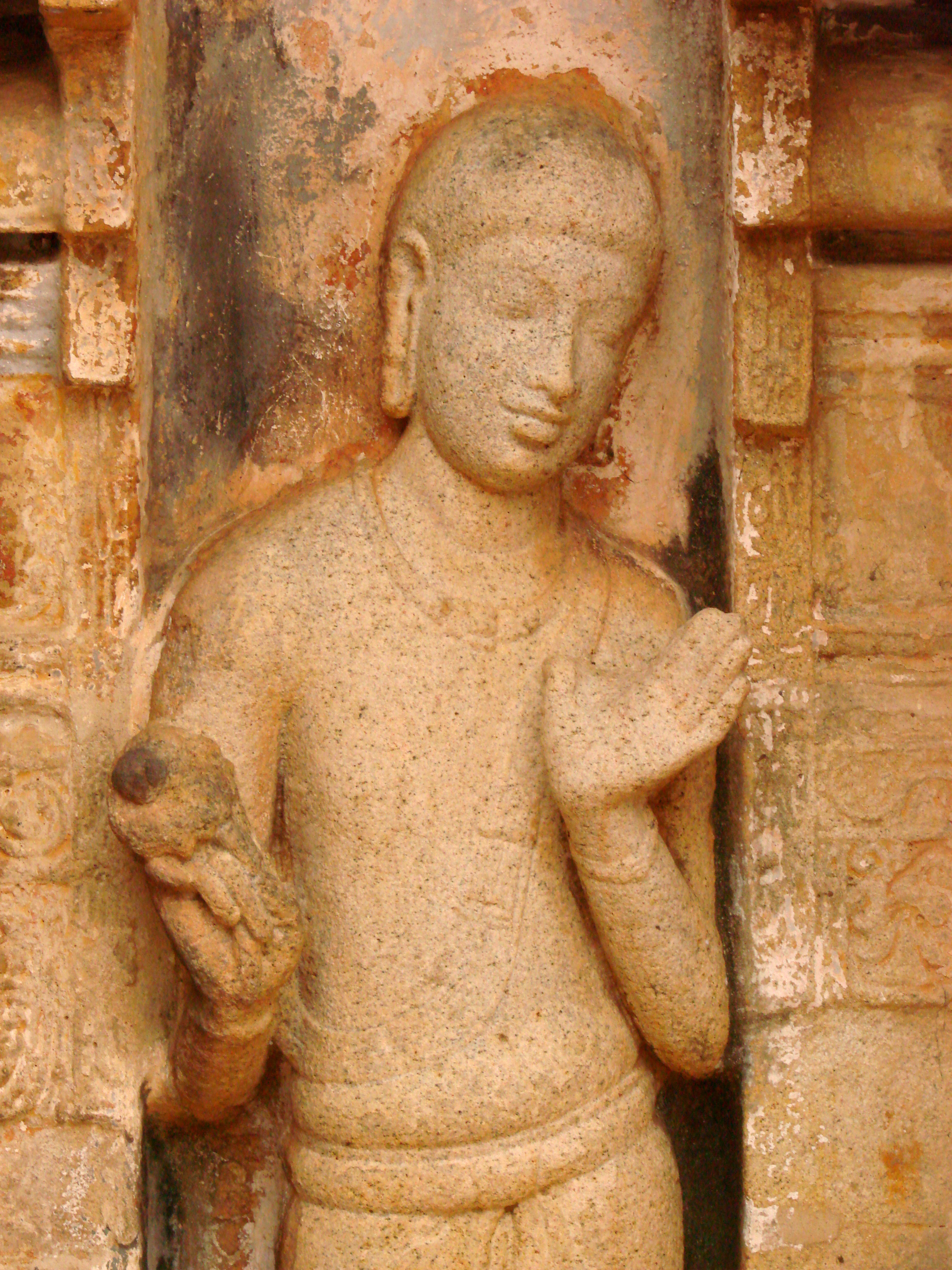
Sculpture on the walls of Nageswaran Temple

=== Early history and battles ===
The region surrounding Kumbakonam was inhabited as early as the Sangam Period (c. 300 BCE – 300 CE). The present-day Kumbakonam is identified with the ancient town of Kudavayil, where the early Chola king Karikala held court. Some scholars also associate the town with Kudavayir-kottam, the prison where the Chera king Kanaikkal Irumporai was held by the early Chola king Kocengannan. Kumbakonam is also linked with Malaikūrram, which had served as the Chola capital in the 7th century CE, as well as the nearby Chola seat of Solamaligai. According to the Sinnamanur plates, Kumbakonam was the site of an 859 CE battle in which the Pandya king Srimara Srivallabha defeated a confederacy of the Pallavas, Cholas and Western Gangas.

=== Medieval Chola era ===
The region grew in political importance under the rule of the medieval Cholas between the 9th and 12th centuries. The nearby town of Pazhaiyaarai, located 8 km (5.0 mi) from Kumbakonam, functioned as Chola capital during the 9th century.

=== Pandyas, Vijayanagara, Nayaks, and Marathas ===
Following the decline of Cholas, the Pandyas took control of Kumbakonam in 1290 CE. With the collapse of Pandya power in the 14th century, Kumbakonam was conquered by the Vijayanagar Empire. The Vijayanagar emperor Krishnadevaraya (r. 1509–1529 CE) visited the town in 1524 and bathed in the Mahamaham tank during the Mahamaham festival. Kumbakonam was later ruled by the Madurai Nayaks and the Thanjavur Nayaks from 1535 until 1673, when it was annexed by the Marathas. After the fall of Vijayanagara empire in 1565, the town saw an influx of poets, musicians, and scholars, which significantly shaped regional demographics and culture. and Each of these dynasties had a considerable impact on the demographics and culture of the region.

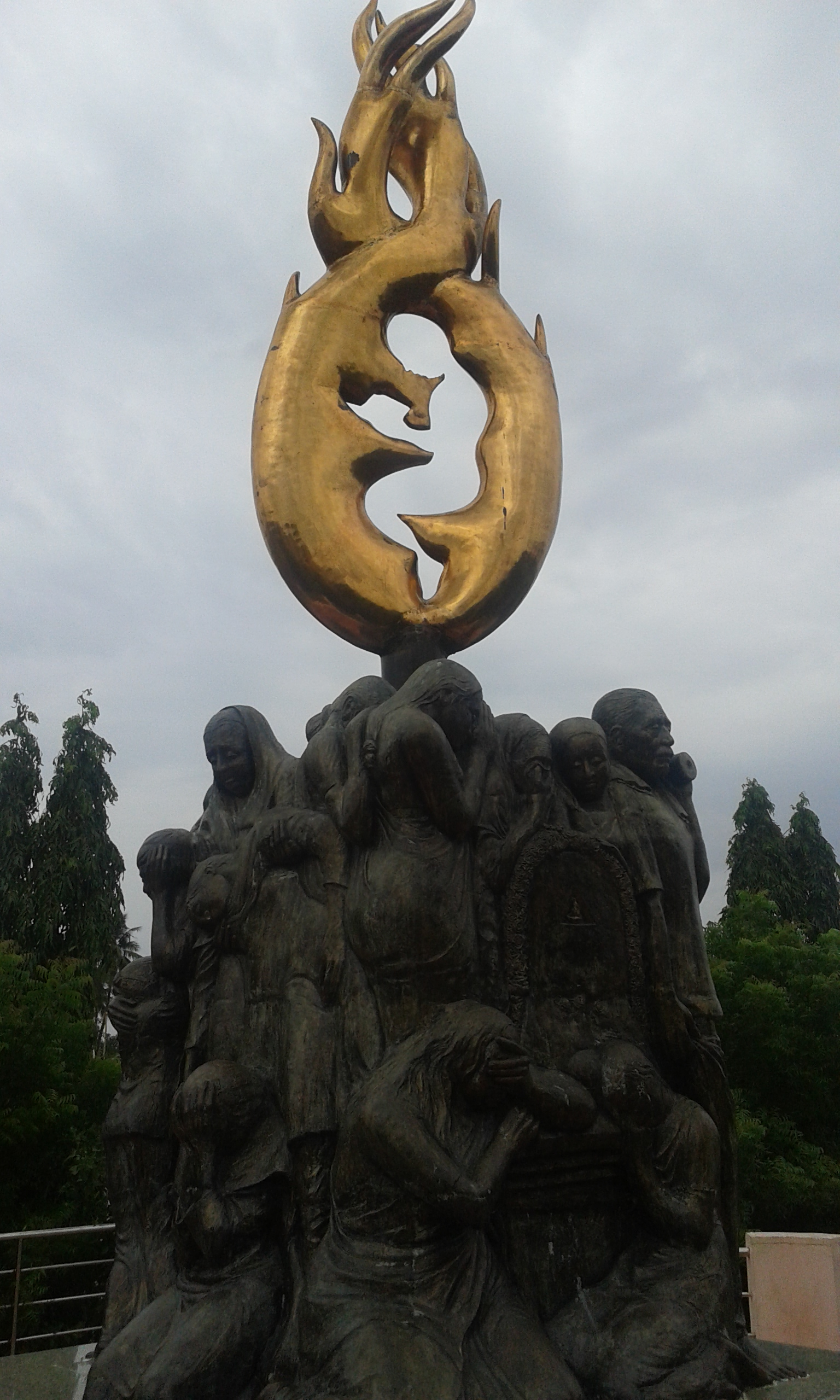
Kumbakonam school fire accident memorial

According to the records of the Kanchi matha, the monastic seat was temporarily relocated to Kumbakonam in the 1780s following the invasion of Kanchipuram by Hyder Ali or Mysore. During Tipu Sultan's invasion of the region in 1784, the town suffered heavy economic disruption and agricultural loses, taking until the early 19th century to recover. In 1799, the Thanjavur Maratha ruler Serfoji II ceded Kumbakonam to the British East India Company. By the late 19th and early 20th centuries, the town had developed into a leading regional center for Vedic scholarship, Hindu religious institutions, and Western-style education within the Madras Presidency. The Tanjore district court was established in the town in 1806 and operated until 1863. Later, the opening of the Suez Canal in 1869 expanded trade links with Britain, and an 1877 railway line connected Kumbakonam with the ports of Madras, Tuticorin and Nagapattinam.

=== Post-independence and modern incidents ===
Kumbakonam continued to grow after Indian independence, though it's growth lagged behind the neighboring Thanjavur in population and administrative scope. Its population growth rate declined noticeably after 1981. This decline has been attributed to the geographical land constraints and limited industrial development, although census data indicates continued growth in the town's peripheral areas. During the 1992 Mahamaham festival, a stampede resulted in 48 deaths and 74 injuries. On 16 July 2004, a fire at the Sri Krishna school resulted in the deaths of 94 school children.

== Geography ==
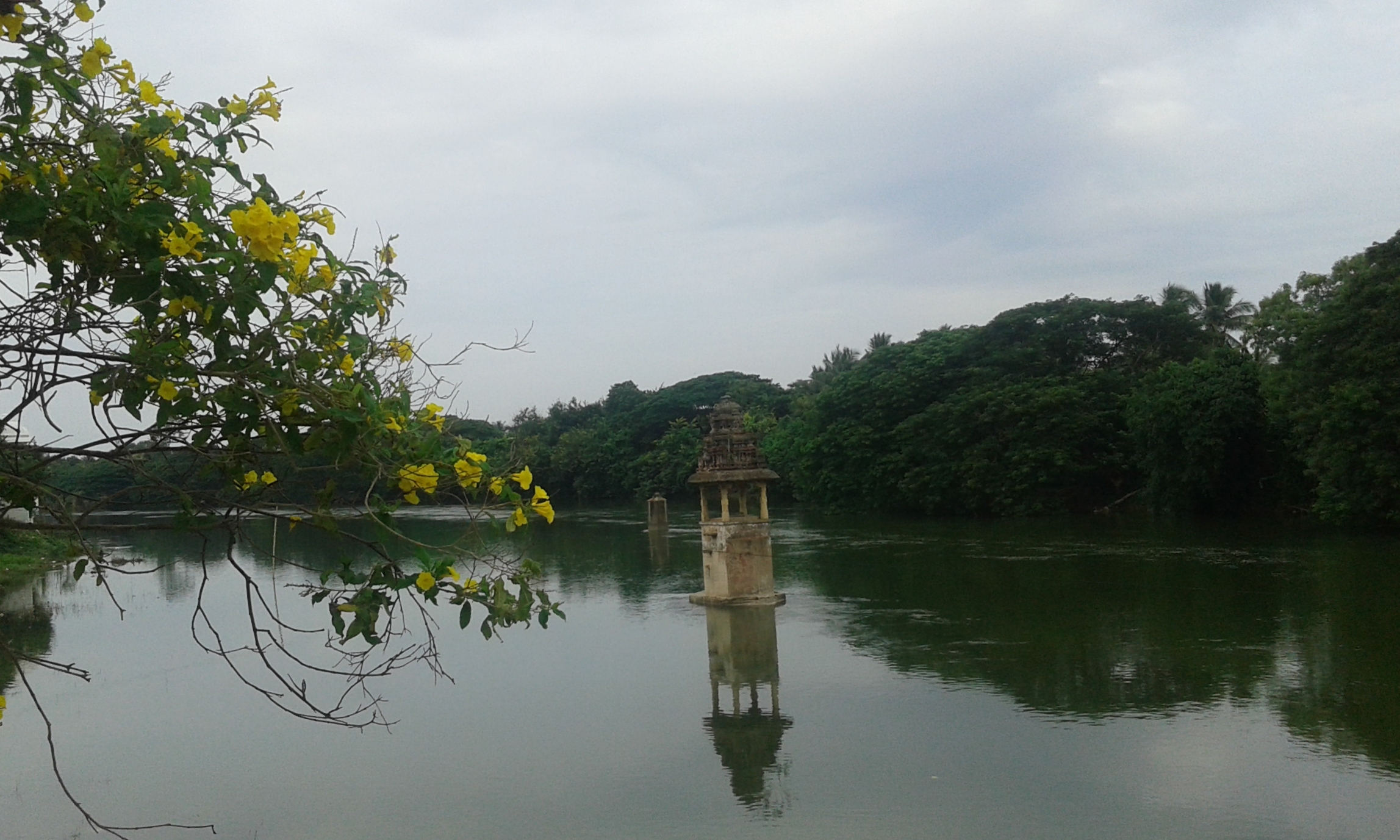
River Kaveri as viewed from bridge

Kumbakonam is located at 10.97°N 79.42°E. It is situated 282 km (175 mi) south of Chennai, 96 km (60 mi) east of Tiruchirappalli, about 40 km (25 mi) northeast of Thanjavur, and about 35 km (22 mi) southwest of Mayiladuthurai. It lies in the "Old delta" region, comprising the northwestern taluks of Thanjavur district that have been naturally irrigated by the Kaveri and its tributaries, in contrast to the "New delta" taluks developed after the construction of the Grand Anicut canal and the Vadavar canal system in 1934. The city has an average elevation of 26 m (85 ft).

The climate is tropical, with summer temperatures reaching approximately 40 °C (104 °F) and winter minimums around 20 °C (68 °F). The town experiences slightly lower average temperatures than Chennai. Kumbakonam receives an average annual rainfall of 114.78 cm (45.19 in). The surrounding region is covered with alluvial or black soil suitable for rice cultivation, alongside secondary crops such as mulberry, cereals and sugarcane.

The town is surrounded by extensive paddy fields, supported by regional irrigation networks following the completion of the Mettur Dam in 1934. Geologically, Kumbakonam lies on the western flank of the Kumbakonam-Shiyali ridge which runs along the Kollidam River basin and separates the Ariyalur-Puducherry depression from the Nagapattinam depression. This ridge extends eastward beneath the Puducherry depression, forming a subterranean layer of cretaceous rock beneath the sedimentary topsoil.

== Demographics ==
Religious census
Religion	Percent(%)
Hindu	86.07%
Muslim	9.57%
Christian	3.99%
Sikh	0.0%
Buddhist	0.0%
Jain	0.23%
Other	0.13%

Historical population
Year	Pop.	±%
1871	44,444	—
1881	50,098	+12.7%
1891	54,307	+8.4%
1901	59,673	+9.9%
1911	64,647	+8.3%
1921	60,700	−6.1%
1931	62,317	+2.7%
1941	67,008	+7.5%
1951	91,648	+36.8%
1961	92,581	+1.0%
1971	113,130	+22.2%
1981	132,832	+17.4%
1991	139,449	+5.0%
2001	140,021	+0.4%
2011	140,056	+0.0%
Sources: 1871 – 1901: 1911 – 1961: 1951 – 2001: 2011:

According to the 2011 census, Kumbakonam had a population of 140,156 with a sex ratio of 1,021 females per 1,000 males, higher the national average of 929. Chikdren under six years of age were 12,791 (6,495 males and 6,296 females). The average literacy of the town was 83.21%, compared to the national average of 72.99%. There were a total of 9,519 workers, including 32 cultivators, 83 primary agricultural labourers, 1,206 household industry workers, 7,169 other main workers, 1,029 marginal workers, 24 marginal cultivators, 45 marginal agricultural labourers, 212 marginal workers in household industries.

Hindus constitute the majority of the population, alongside Muslim and Christian communities. Major Tamil-speaking Hindu communities include, Vanniyars, Kallars, Brahmins and Dalits Kumbakonam has historically had higher Brahmin population than other towns in the state. Other communities include Moopanars, Konars and Nadars. The Muslim population predominantly are Tamil-speaking Rowthers, engaged in local commerce and trade. The christian population includes Protestant Christians—established partly through the early work of the missionary Christian Friedrich Schwarz. The Catholics are affiliated with the Roman Catholic Diocese of Kumbakonam, which was separated from the Archdiocese of Pondicherry in 1899.

Tamil is the primary language of the city, with the Central Tamil dialect being the most widely spoken. Linguistic minorities include the population speaking Thanjavur Marathi, Saurashtra and other regional languages as their mother tongue.

Residential areas account for 32.09% of the municipal area, while commercial enterprises and industrial units comprise 2.75% and 1.21%, respectively. Non-urban land constitutes approximately 44.72% of the total area. The city has 45 notified slum areas, with a population of 49,117.

According to the 2011 religious census, the population was 86.07% Hindu, 9.57% Muslim, 3.99% Christian, 0.23% Jain, and 0.14% other or unstated.

== Administration and Politics ==
=== Municipal Corporation ===
Municipality corporation officials
Mayor	K.Saravanan(Congress)
Corporation Commissioner	M.Senthil Murugan
Deputy Mayor	Tamilazhagan(DMK)
Elected members
Member of Legislative Assembly	Vinoth raj
Member of Parliament	R. Sudha

The Kumbakonam municipality was constituted in 1866, initially governing an area of 7.68 km^{2} (2.97 sq mi) through a municipal committee. It was later upgraded to a special-grade municipality covering an area of 12.58 km^{2} (4.86 sq mi) out of the town's total area of 64.02 km^{2} (24.72 sq mi). It comprises 48 wards and is the largest municipality in Thanjavur district. On 24 August 2021, it was upgraded to a Municipal Corporation, expanding its administration jurisdiction to 42.9 km^{2} (16.6 sq mi).

The municipal administration is organized into six departments: General Administration, Engineering, Revenue, Public Health, Town planning and Information Technology. The executive authority remains with the Municipal Commissioner. The legislative functions are carried out by a council of 48 elected ward members, headed by a Mayor and Deputy Mayor.

=== Politics ===
The city forms part of the Kumbakonam Legislative Assembly constituency, electing a member to the Tamil Nadu Legislative Assembly every five years. The Indian National Congress won the initial state elections between 1952 and 1971. From 1977 onward, representation has alternated between the Dravida Munnetra Kazhagam (DMK), All India Anna Dravida Munnetra Kazhagam (AIADMK), and Congress, with DMK candidate Ko. Si. Mani serving multiple terms between 1989 and 2011. Kumbakonam had its won parliamentary constituency from 1952 until 1977, when it was abolished during delimitation. The assembly segment was merged into the Mayiladuthurai Lok Sabha constituency.

=== Law Enforcement ===
Law enforcement in Kumbakonam is overseen by the Thanjavur subdivision of the Tamil Nadu Police, headed by a Deputy Superintendent of Police (DSP). The city contains four police stations, including an all-women police station. Specialized district units—such as crime records, prohibition enforcement, social justice and human rights—operate under the district Superintendent of Police (SP). Suburban areas fall under the jurisdiction of surrounding stations at Swamimalai, Patteeswaram, Nachiyarkovil, Tiruvidamarudhur, Cholapuram.

== Economy ==
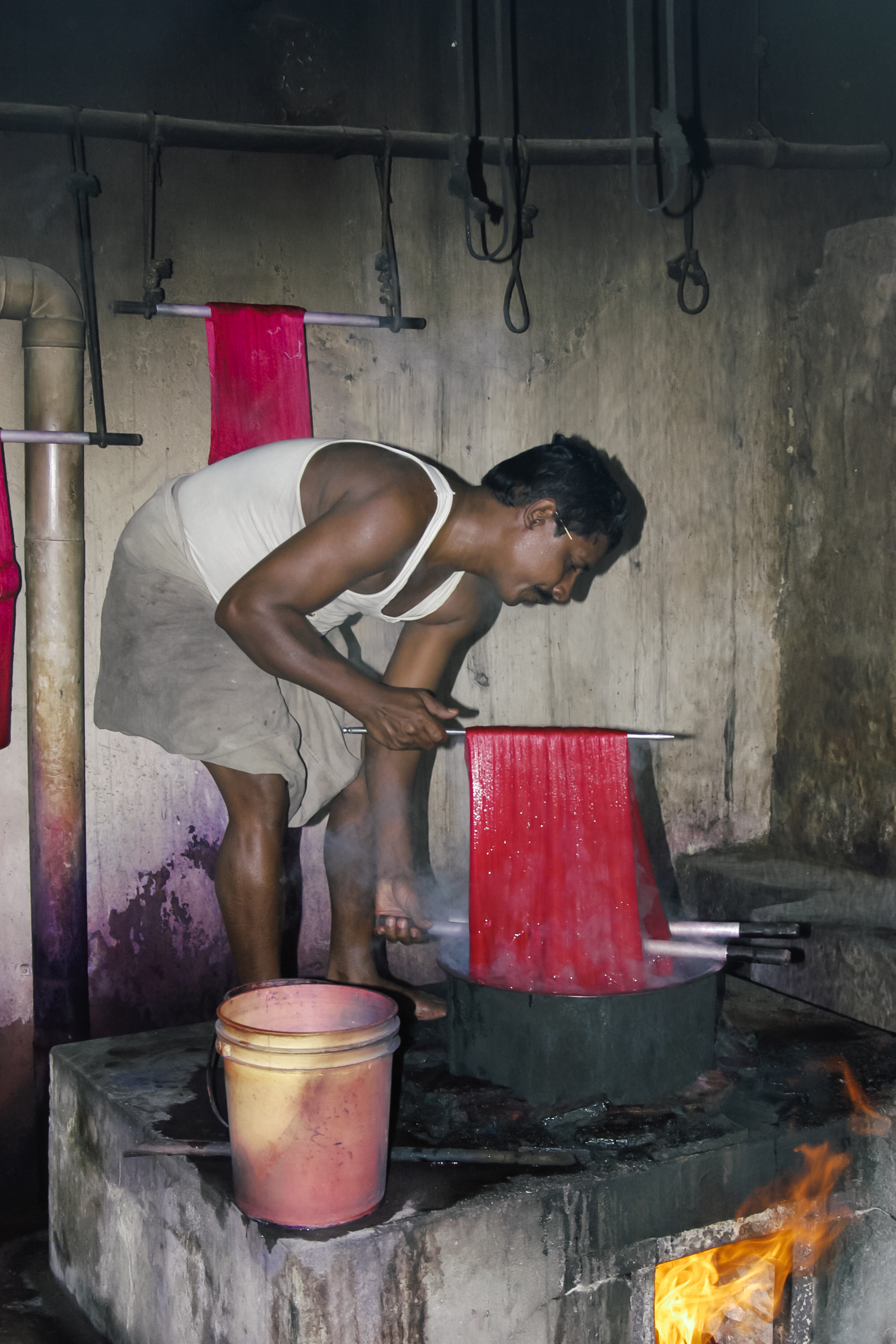
A man dyeing silk red in boiling water in Kumbakonam, Tamil Nadu

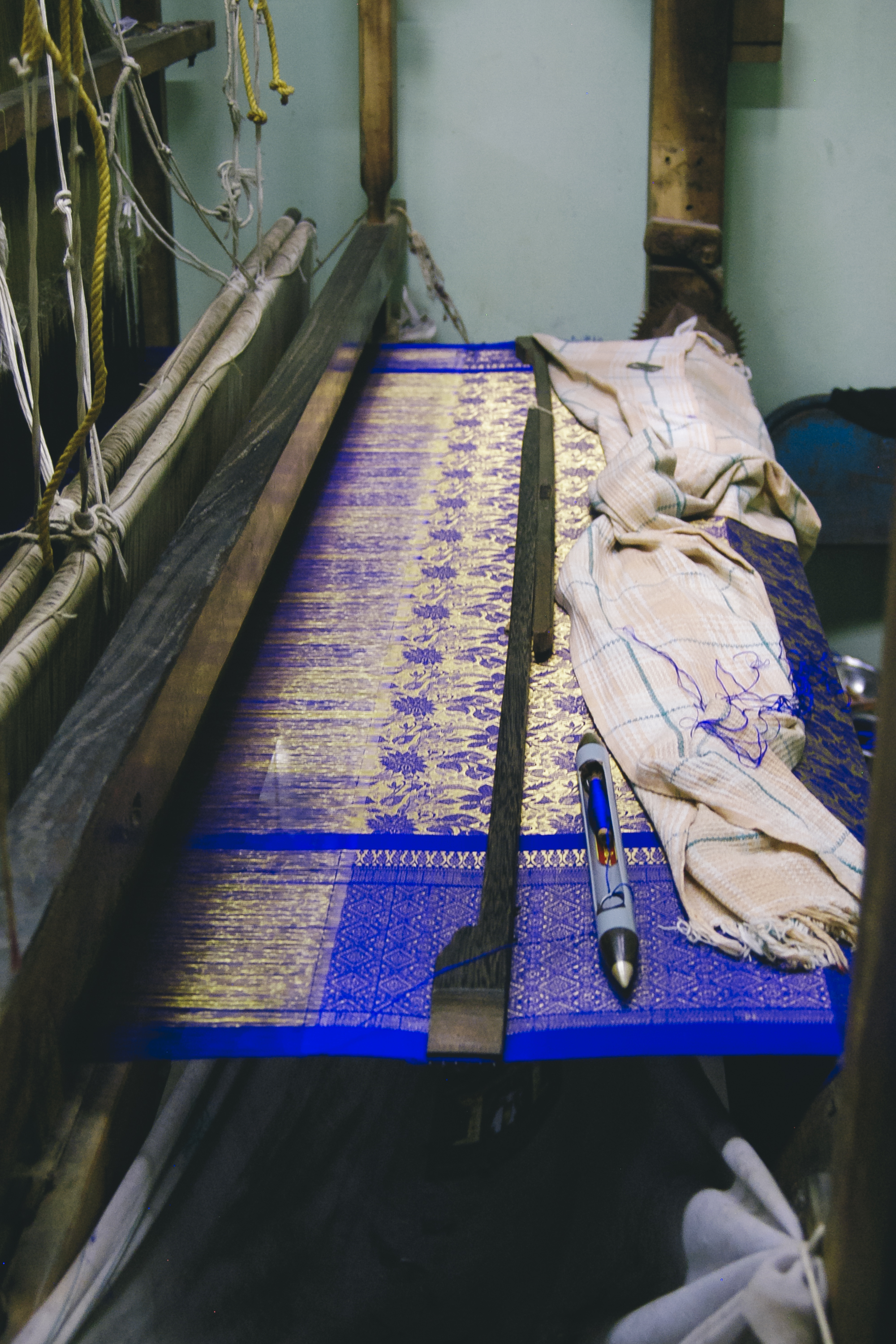
A silk saree loom in Kumbakonam, Tamil Nadu

Kumbakonam acts a primary commercial center for the Thanjavur region. Major traditional manufactures include brass, bronze, copper and pewter vessels, silk and cotton textiles, sugar, indigo, and pottery. Agriculture and food processing form a major component of the local economy; of194 industrial units registered in 1991, 57 were rice and flour mills. The surrounding rural areas produces betel leaves and areca nuts, supporting local processing enterprises such as A. R. R. Agencies and the cosmetic manufacturer T. S. R. & Co. The region is known for metal casting and bronze iconography, supported by training facilities run by the Tamil Nadu Handicraft Development Corporation in nearby Swamimalai. Silk weaving is another major traditional craft, involving over 5,000 families in the weaving of Thirubuvanam silk sarees and handloom fabrics. Kumbakonam was a salt-producing center during British rule. The town is also known for Kumbakonam Degree Coffee, a style of filter coffee brewed with undiluted milk. Chemical and fertilizer manufacturing has also emerged in the surrounding area..

Pilgrimage and cultural heritage tourism contribute substantially to the local eceonomy. Key attractions include numerous historical temples within the city and the 12th-century Airavatesvara Temple at nearby Darasuram, a UNESCO World Heritage Site. The city also attracts buyers of handlooms, metal iconography craft, and regional antiques. Financial services in the city are provided by City Union Bank, which was founded here in 1904 as Kumbakonam Bank Limited and remains headquartered in the city, along with branches of major public and private sector banks.

== Utility services ==
Electricity distribution is managed by the Kumbakonam circle of Tamil Nadu Electricity Board (TANGEDCO/TNEB). It is supported by substations at Rajan Thottam, Nagariyam, Sakottai and Patteeswaram. Potable water is sourced from the Kaveri and Kollidam river through pumping stations at Valayapettai and Kudithangi. The supply is approximately 3,265 kL (863,000 U.S. gal). Municipal services collect about 18 t (40,000 lb) of solid waste each day—composed of 53% domestic and 32% commercial waste. The collected waste is processed into compost at yards outside the city. The municipal corporation maintains an underground drainage system, with work ongoing for peripheral area connectivity. Sullage disposal relies on septic tanks and open storm drain that discharge into local low-lying areas.

Telecommunication and broadband internet services are provided by Bharat Sanchar Nigam Limited (BSNL) and private operators. Healthcare services are provided by Kumbakonam district headquarters hospital, the Coronation Municipal Hospital, the Melakaveri Urban Primary Health Centre, and several private clinics.

== Landmarks ==
=== Temples ===
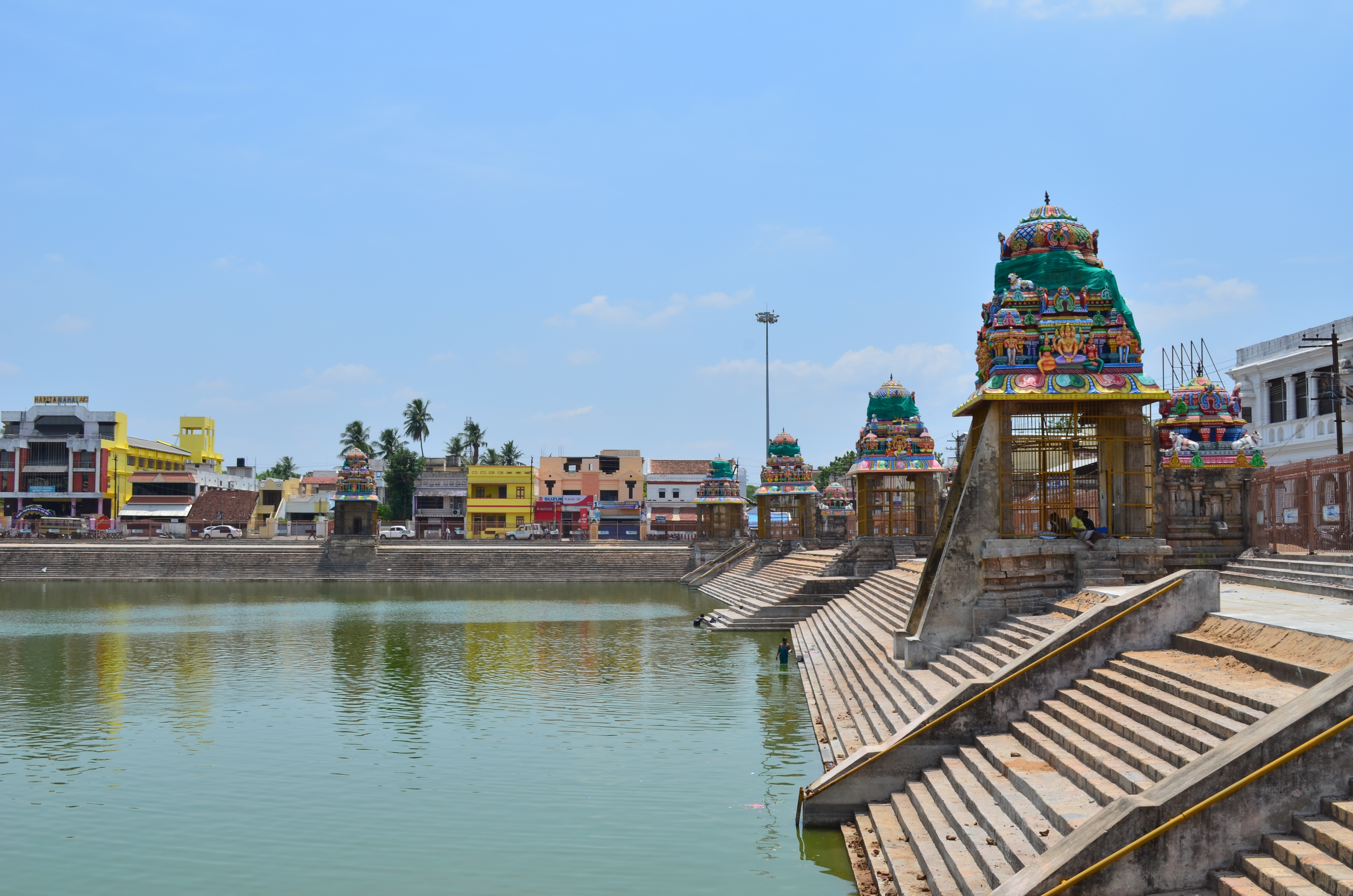
Mahamaham tank – one of the most prominent landmarks of the town

Kumbakonam is known for its temples and mathas (monasteries). Approximately 188 Hindu temples are within the municipal limits, with several additional temples across the surrounding taluk town thereby earning the moniker "Temple Town" and "City of Temples".

Adi Kumbeswarar Temple is the oldest Shaivaite shrine in the city, with origins dating back to 7th-century Chola period. The Nageswaraswamy Temple features a separate shrine for Surya, the Sun god. Along with Kasi Viswanathar temple, both shrines are revered in the 7th- to 8th-century Tevaram canons. The city also contains a rare temple dedicated to Brahma.

Sarangapani temple is the largest Vaishnavaite shrine in Kumbakonam, featuring a twelve-tiered gopuram (gateway tower) constructed during the Nayak period. It is one of the "Divya Desams", the 108 temples of Vishnu revered by the 12 Alvar saint-poets. The Ramaswamy temple, known for its depiction of Ramayana on its walls, was built by Govinda Dikshitar, prime minister to the Thanjavur Nayak rulers Achuthappa Nayak (r. 1560–1614) and Raghunatha Nayak (r. 1600–1634). Dikshitar also laid out Chinna Kadai Veethi, a market corridor linking Ramaswamy and Chakrapani temples. The Mahamaham festival, held once every 12 years, attracts millions of pilgrims from all parts of India who take a holy dip in the Mahamaham tank. Over 4 million pilgrims participated in the festival during the 2016 event which is also known as the Southern Kumbha mela. Govinda Dikshitar also constructed the sixteen mandapams (pavilions) surrounding the Mahamaham tank. Most Vaishnavite temples in the region continue to adhere to the Vadakalai tradition of Sri Vaishnavam.

The city is a traditional center for monastic institutions (mathas). The Kanch Kamakoti Peetham was temporarily based here during the reign of Thanjavur Maratha ruler Pratap Singh (r. 1739–1763) until the mid-20th century. Other major mathas include the Raghavendra matha, a branch of Ahobila mutt, and nearby Shaiva monasteries at Dharmapuram and Thiruppanandal.

Other prominent nearby shrines include the Thenupuriswarar Temple at Patteeswaram, Oppiliappan Kovil and Swamimalai Murugan temple. At Darasuram, located 3 km (1.9 mi) away, is the 12th-century Airavatesvara Temple built by Rajaraja Chola II (r. 1146–1173). It is recognized as a UNESCO World Heritage Site, along with other Great Living Chola Temples.

== Transport ==
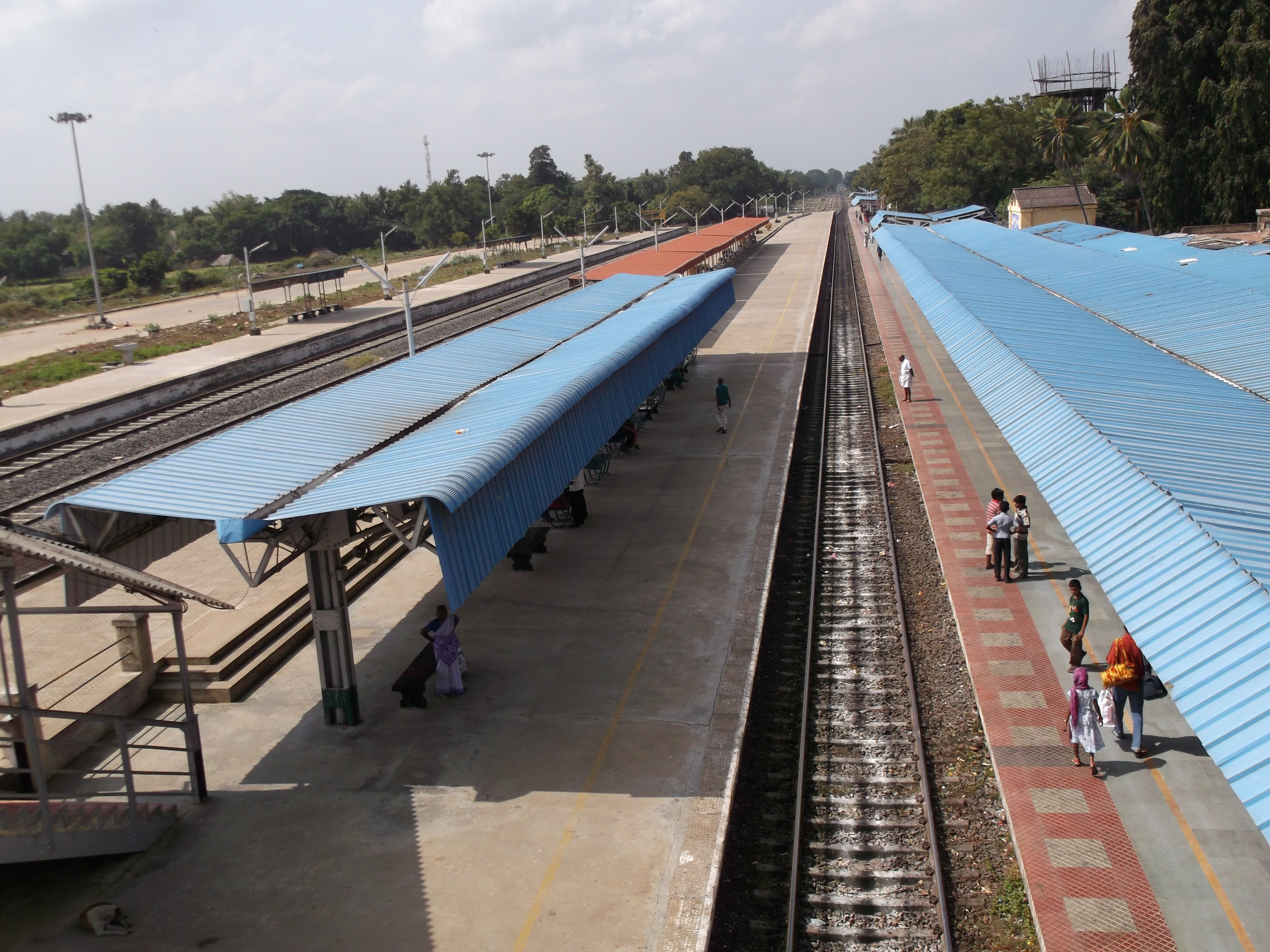
Kumbakonam railway station (southern side)

=== Infrastructure ===
The National highway NH-36 connecting Vikravandi - Manamadurai, passes through this town. The nearest commercial airport is the Tiruchirappalli International Airport, located 91 km (57 mi) away. The nearest seaport is at Nagapattinam, approximately 50 km (31 mi) away. The length of road network within the city limts is approximately 141 km (88 mi), including 122.29 km (75.99 mi) of municipal roads—over 87% are paved—across 544 streets and 18.71 km (11.63 mi) of state highways.

=== Rail services ===
Kumbakonam railway station provides rail connectivity across South India, including direct services such as Mysore–Mayiladuthurai Express to Mysuru and Bengaluru. Daily express trains link the city with major destinations in Tamil Nadu, including Chennai, Coimbatore, Madurai and Tiruchirapalli. Regional passenger trains operate to Thanjavur, Tiruchirappalli, Chidambaram and Mayiladuthurai. National Highway 36 (NH 36), which connects the city to Thanjavur and Chennai, is currently being widened from two lanes to a four-lane highway.

=== Bus services ===
Regular bus services operate from the city to several major cities across Tamil Nadu, including Chennai, Thanjavur, Tiruchirappalli, Coimbatore, and Salem, as well as Puducherry. Interstate bus services to Bengaluru and Mysuru are operated by the Karnataka State Road Transport Corporation (KSRTC) and the State Express Transport Corporation (SETC). On 1 March 1972, the Government of Tamil Nadu established the Cholan Roadways Corporation in Kumbakonam, and acquired the fleets of private operators including Sri Ramavilas Service, Raman and Raman Limited and Sathi Vilas. It was renamed Tamil Nadu State Transport Corporation (TNSTC), Kumbakonam on 1 July 1997. This organization presently functions as Division I of the state transport network and maintains the central reconditioning facilities in the city.

Local transit operates from the town bus stand, located opposite the Arignar Anna Bus Stand for long-distance routes. Historically, bullock carts and river coracles were primary modes of transport. Students and residents crossed the Kaveri by coracle until a road bridge was constructed in 1944.

== Education ==
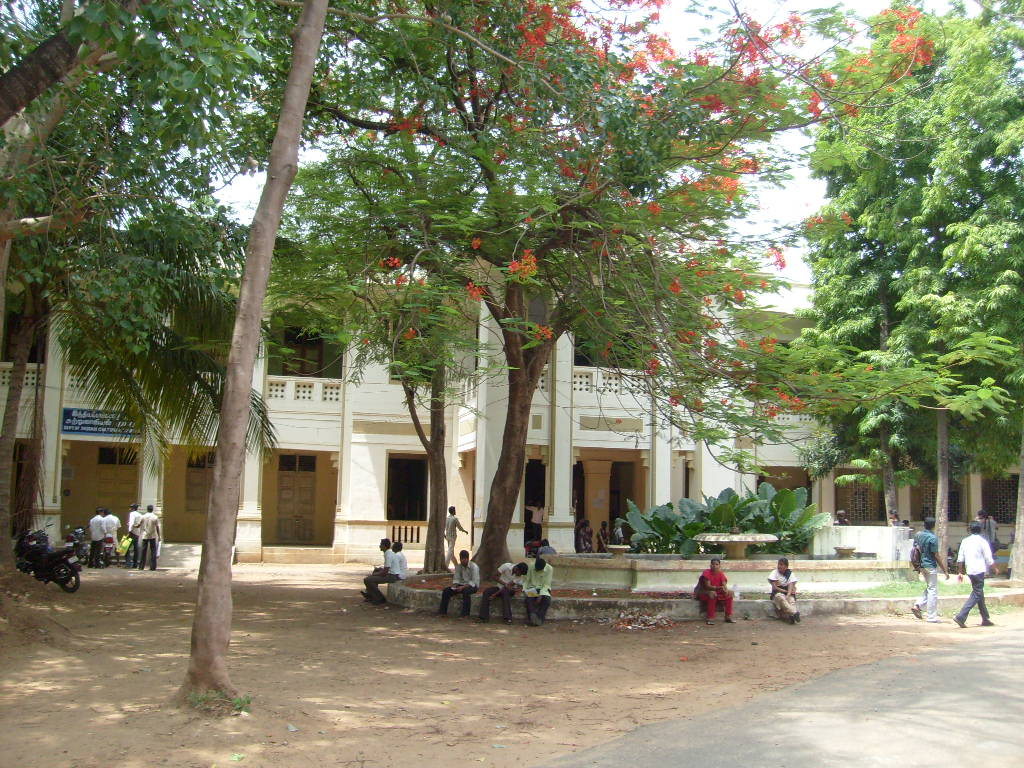
Government Arts College, Kumbakonam

The Raja Veda Padasala, established by Govinda Dikshitar in 1542, is a traditional institution that teaches Vedic disciplines including the Rig Veda, Yajur Veda, Sama Veda, Agamas and Sastras. The city developed into an important educational centre in the late 19th century, earning the nick name "Cambridge of South India". The Government Arts College started as a provincial school on 19 October 1854 and was later upgraded to a college in 1867. It was later affiliated to the Madras University in 1877.

The college's early educators—William Archer Porter (a Cambridge Wrangler) and T. Gopala Rao—shaped it's curriculum. Secondary school classes were discontinued in 1881 as it transitioned to an exclusive higer education institute. Tamil scholar U. V. Swaminatha Iyer (1855–1942) was a faculty, while the alumni include the Indian mathematician Srinivasa Ramanujan (1887–1920) and statesman V. S. Srinivasa Sastri (1869–1946). The Government Arts College for Women was established in 1963, which later affiliated with Bharathidasan University, provides undergraduate and postgraduate degree programs. Other higher education institutes include Government College Of Fine Arts, several private engineering and arts colleges, and a satellite campus of SASTRA University.

Historic secondary schools in the city include the Native High School (established 1876) and the Town Higher Secondary School, where Ramanujan was a student. Kumbakonam currently contains 36 government and private schools.

== Notable people ==
- U. V. Swaminatha Iyer (1855–1942), Tamil scholar
- Srinivasa Ramanujan (1887–1920), mathematician
- Valangaiman Sankaranarayana Srinivasa Sastri (1869–1946), politician
- Mankombu Sambasivan Swaminathan (1925–2023), geneticist and plant breeder
- Sir Henry Cotton (1845–1915), British Civil servant and Member of Parliament
