= 2004 Kumbakonam School fire =

Fire in Tamil Nadu, India

Kumbakonam School fire
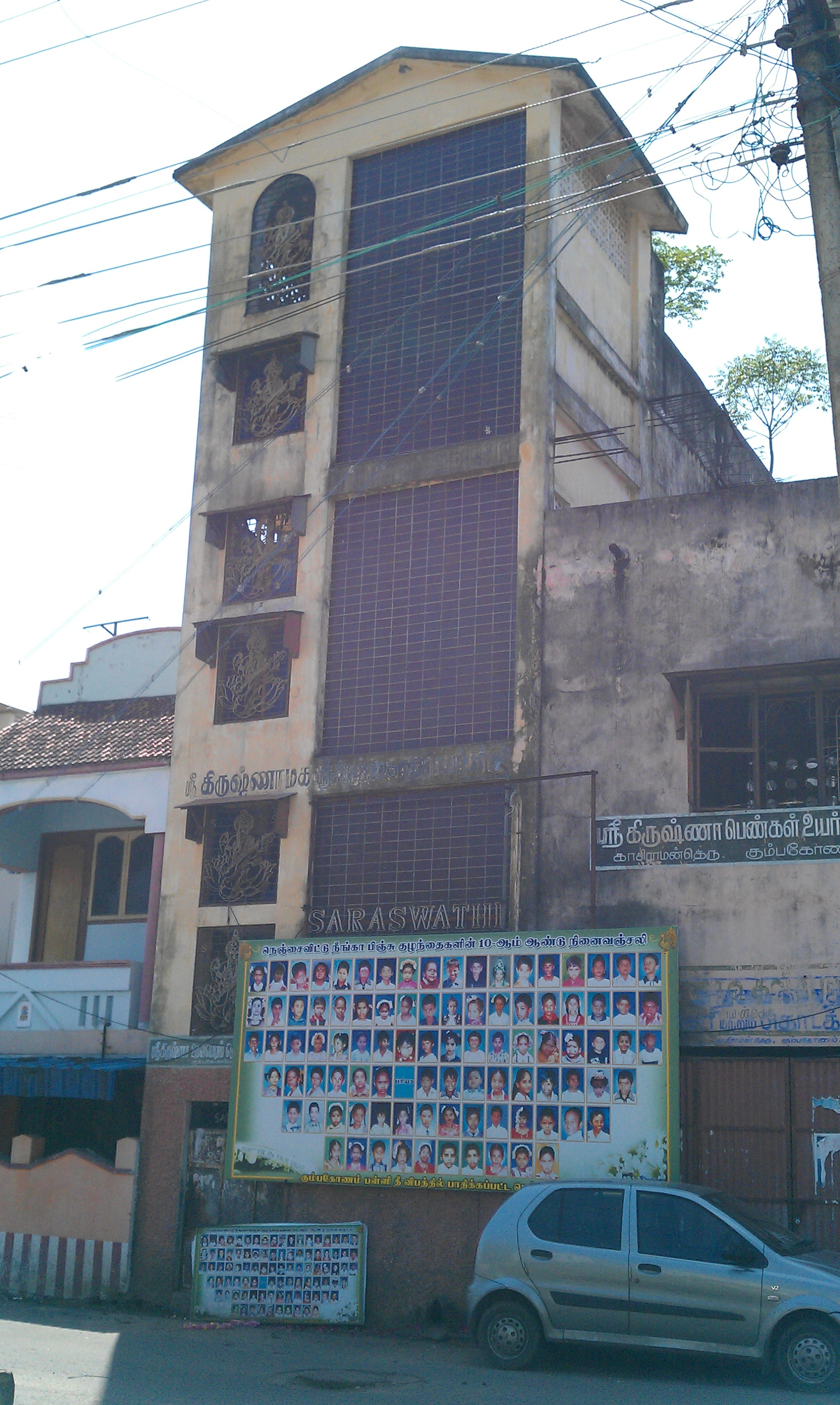
- The school after the fire with the pictures of the deceased children
- Date: 16 July 2004
- Location: Kumbakonam; 10°58′12″N 79°25′12″E
- Cause: Fire
- Deaths: 94
- Charges: 21
- Verdict: 1 (life imprisonment), 8 (five years jail), 1 (two years jail)
- Convictions: 10

The 2004 Kumbakonam school fire happened in a school in Kumbakonam in the Thanjavur district of the Indian state of Tamil Nadu. On 16 July 2004, 94 students from the Krishna English Medium School's primary section were killed after the school's thatched roof caught fire. The accident was one of the four most significant fire accidents, the most significant school accident in the history of Tamil Nadu, and the second-largest school fire in India in terms of casualties after the Dabwali fire accident.

A committee set up under retired Judge Sampath found out that the heavy casualties were due to the management's tactics to admit extra students to a primary school in order to mislead the authorities about the student-teacher ratio. The Chief Minister, who visited the site, ordered the withdrawal of the recognition of the three schools, prosecution of the school authorities and the correspondent, and the suspension of the Chief Educational Officer, the District Elementary Educational Officer, and the Assistant Elementary Educational Officer of the Thanjavur school district.

A compensation of ₹ 100,000 was provided to the next of the kin of the deceased, ₹ 25,000 to the severely injured, and ₹ 10,000 to other injured victims from the Chief Minister’s Public Relief Fund. The district administration arranged another primary school in Natham village and accommodated 46 students under the government's Educational Guarantee Scheme.

After a long delay, a trial began on 24 September 2012 in the Thanjavur district court. The case had 21 accused and 488 witnesses, including 18 children who survived the fire. The headmaster Prabharan and three others were charged in the case, along with Pulavar Palanichamy, his wife and correspondent of the school Saraswati, three teachers, six officers of the Elementary Education Department, the Kumbakonam Municipal Commissioner, the town planning officer, and four assistants of the education department. On 30 July 2014, the court sentenced the school founder Pulavar Palanichamy to life imprisonment and fined him ₹5,165,700. Eight others, including school staff and officials from Kumbakonam and the state education department, were sentenced to five years imprisonment, and another to two years imprisonment. Eleven of those accused, including three teachers, were acquitted.

== Background ==
There were three schools, namely, Sri Krishna Aided Primary School, Saraswathy Nursery and Primary School, and Sri Krishna Girls High School, operating in the same building in Kasiraman street in Kumbakonam, a town in the South Indian state of Tamil Nadu. The school was located amidst residential buildings, 15 m (49 ft) away from the main road. The school had a small gate 4 ft (1.2 m) wide, immediately beyond which the classrooms were located. The classrooms did not have any partition, and there was a stage at the end of the classroom. On the northwest side of the stage were the noon meal kitchen and a cycle stand, both of which were thatched structures. The northern wing in the ground floor accommodated the Saraswathy Nursery and Primary School, which had six classes, one each for LKG (Lower Kindergarten), UKG (Upper Kindergarten), I, II, IV, and V. There was another entrance to the school on the eastern side.

The buildings in the nursery and primary schools had no ventilation. Near the eastern entrance, there was a narrow staircase 4.5 ft (1.4 m) wide leading to the first floor of the building. The layout of the first floor was similar to the ground floor, where classes had no separation, and the exit was through a narrow collapsible door. The lower end of the class on the western side was connected to the noon meal kitchen thatched roof and the cycle stand roof, where the accident occurred. The Sri Krishna Girls High School had 179, Sri Krishna Aided Primary School had 477, and Saraswathy Nursery and Primary School had 126 students in their roles, totaling 782 students in the three schools. The second floor measured 62.5 ft (19.1 m) * 13 ft (4.0 m) and had classes for standards VI, VII, VIII, and IX of the girl's high school. The third floor had an open terrace having a water tank.

== Accident ==
On 16 July 2004, a fire broke out, with the school's thatched roof structure catching fire initially. The school started at 9:15 a.m., and during one of the breaks at 10:30 a.m., one of the girl students noticed the fire and alerted the teacher, and the news spread to other classes. The fire sparked from the midday meal kitchen thatch and spread to the upper level, which also had a thatched roof and spread rapidly. The narrow staircase had sundry material that prevented the exit of children. The staircase was also located close to the kitchen. The kitchen used fire logs for cooking unlike other schools, which had gas stoves. The school was overcrowded, having 900 children enrolled. The thatch and the supporting bamboo poles caught fire, fell on the children, and also blocked the exit.

The fire service was informed at 11 a.m., and the personnel arrived in a few minutes. But since they were unprepared for such a large-scale fire, the rescue services were not effective. The locals also helped by breaking the concrete window. The injured children were admitted to the Government hospital in Kumbakonam and some of them later got shifted to Thanjavur Medical College hospital.

== Victims ==
The deceased children were taken to the government hospital for postmortem. By the end of the day of the accident, 76 children were reported killed, and their bodies had been handed over to their families by the district administration. The Collector of the district administration arranged for temporary wards in the Government hospital for the parents to identify their children. The digging of graves for 56 bodies went on until 2 a.m. the next morning, with the help of additional diggers arranged by the district administration.

On 16 July, additional doctors arrived from Kilpauk Medical College, JIPMER Medical College Hospital, C.M.C., Vellore, Salem, and Coimbatore to treat the injured. The casualty increased to 90, 89 of whom were identified and handed over to the parents. Some of the injured were shifted to private hospitals in Kumbakonam, Madurai, and Chennai as requested by the parents. There were 65 who were still undergoing treatment on 16 July, although four of them later died, increasing the total death toll to 94.

== Aftermath ==
Prayer for departed children of Kumbakonam

"Oh dear little ones! Oh dear little ones!
For you, parents had glorious dream!
And You were all immersed in your own dreams
Yet, Agni engulfed you and all those dreams
Taking you to Almighty's divine presence
Usually, departed old parents and buried by sons
Whereas, Kumbakonam, saw a sad scene!
Crying parents burying their little ones!!
Oh Almighty! show your grace on those little ones
And keep them in Thy holiest presence!!
Oh Almighty! bless those parents wailing in grief
To have the strength to bear this great loss
May Thy compassion and grace pervade all souls
And bring down the pain and wipe away the tears
Oh Almighty! show your grace on those little ones"

— ~ A.P.J. Abdul Kalam, Prayer for departed children of Kumbakonam, 2004

The accident was one of the four major fire accidents in the state following the Brihadeeswarar Temple fire on 7 June 1997, when 60 people were killed, Erwadi fire incident on 6 August 2001 that killed 30 mentally challenged people and fire at a marriage hall on 23 January 2004 at Srirangam where 30 people including the bridegroom were killed. The accident was the second in terms of casualties for fire accidents in schools after the one in 1995 in Dabwali, Mandi in Sirsa District of the Haryana State, where 400 people were killed in a school fire during a prize distribution ceremony of the DAV Public School. It was the largest school accident in Tamil Nadu, followed by a private school building collapse in Madurai during the 1950s that killed 35 girls and injured 137 others. The accident raised several questions on the Tamil Nadu Educational Department on the safety rule implementation, training of school teachers in civil defense, and enforcement of rules imparting education.

The Chief Minister who visited the site ordered the withdrawal of recognition of the three schools, prosecution of the school authorities and the correspondent, Suspension of the Chief Educational Officer, the District Elementary Educational Officer, and the Assistant Elementary Educational Officer of Thanjur school district. A compensation of ₹ one lakh was provided to the relatives of the deceased, ₹25,000 to the severely injured and ₹ 10,000 to other injured from the Chief Minister’s Public Relief Fund. Counseling sessions were arranged for the children affected by the trauma and arrangements were made to facilitate the surviving children to join other schools. A central minister also visited the site on behalf of the Prime Minister of India. The relief announced by the state and central government were disbursed on 17 July 2004. The district administration arranged a primary school in Natham village and accommodated 46 students under the Educational Guarantee Scheme of the government.

Yadava College constructed a park in memory of the 94 children by planting 94 saplings and termed in Kumbakonam Park in an idea to create environmental awareness among future generations. The state government constructed a memorial park near Palakarai, the Cauvery bridge, in Kumbakonam in memory of the lost lives. The park was opened by the then Deputy Chief Minister, M.K. Stalin on 6 June 2010. The park was constructed at a cost of ₹ 19 lakh, housing children's amusement equipment in an area of 7,300 sq ft (680 m^{2}). The government allotted housing plots to 59 homeless parents of the deceased of the total 89. A charitable trust named Amritha helped construct houses in the plots and the colony was named Amrithapuram. In 2012, 25 families of the victims constructed an Amritha Vinayagar temple on the premises in memory of the lost lives. The temple was consecrated on 21 June 2012.

The state government constructed a memorial park near Palakarai, Kumbakonam, in memory of the lost lives, which opened on 6 June 2010. The government also allotted housing plots to 59 homeless parents of the 89 deceased students.

== Investigation ==
The Tamil Nadu state government deputed a committee under Justice K. Sampath on 20 July 2004 to inquire into the circumstances and causes of the fire accident. The committee assumed office on 1 August 2004 and was constituted with expert members Dr. Rani Kandhaswami (Former Principal, Lady Willington Institute of Advanced Studies in Education, Chennai), S.K. Saxena (Fire Officer, Madras Atomic Power Station, Kalpakkam), K. Vijayan (Clinical Psychologist, Institute of Mental Health, Chennai) and P.A. Annamalai (retired Head Master).

The committee was given a timeline of four months but the timeline was extended four times; the investigation was completed on 30 June 2005. The investigations revealed that the school had not been inspected by the Education Department officials for three years. The fire officials reported that the building laws were not followed as the school had a thatched kitchen and classroom, had no emergency exits and was a "death trap". The schools had to follow minimum safety standards, the chapter IV on fire and safety of National Building Code of India 2005 and 14435:1997 states the code of practice of fire safety in educational institutions. A public interest litigation was filed in the Supreme Court of India by Avinash Mehrotra quoting the accident and pleading protection of life and safety of school children across various other schools in India.

The school teachers were not trained properly to handle the situation. The investigation revealed that the role of teachers was highly questionable. One view held that most of them found ways to escape themselves rather than saving the children as many came out unscathed. Some of the student eyewitnesses revealed that the teachers asked them to remain in the classes. However, some hold that the teachers tried their best to rescue the children and some of them asked the children to stay in the classes as they thought the fire was just the regular smoke from the kitchen.

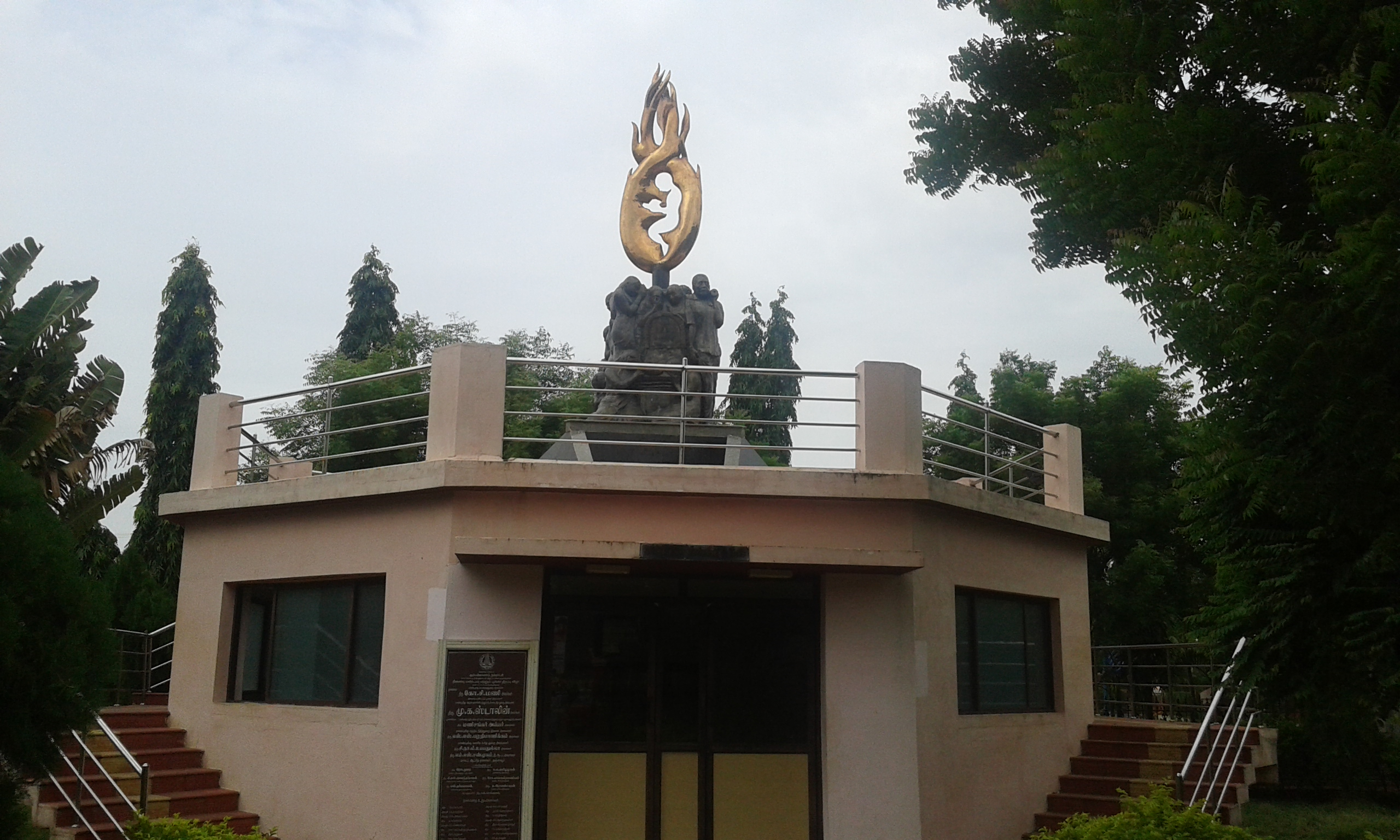
Kumbakonam school fire memorial located near Kaveri bridge

The committee found that the major reason for the heavy casualty was the false tactics of the management to bring the other two school students to the aided primary school to mislead the inspecting authorities about the student-teacher ratio. The management was held responsible for the whole accident. The report pointed out that the teachers were not trained in disaster management and the prohibited thatch structure was close to the classrooms. It also stated that the schools had inadequate exit facilities and had no firefighting capabilities. Pulavar Palanichamy, the owner of the schools, was reported to have used his political clout and coalesced with the municipal and the revenue department officials for getting the permits for the schools. Vijayalakshmi, the noon meal organizer and teacher of the English Medium School, was held accountable for not performing her duties of taking safety precautions.

Vasanthi, the head cook, lit the oven in the absence of her assistant, Sivasankari, who usually lights it. There were contrasting reports on whether Sivasankari was present in the school during the event. The tahsildar of Kumbakonam Taluk, Paramasivam, was reported "dishonest" for granting a license under the Tamil Nadu Public Buildings (Licensing) Act, 1965 to the school. The chartered engineer Jayachandran was also held dishonest of giving stability certificate to the building without visiting the school once. The additional assistant educational officer, Madhavan for allowing the school to run without recognition for 6 years. Sivaprakasam, the assistant elementary education officer, was held accountable for allowing Madhavan, who was not competent to allow a permit to the school. Balaji, the deputy education elementary officer was accused of carelessly passing the papers signed by Madhavan. The local health officer Dr. Sivapunyam was accused of giving a false sanitary certificate to the school. Annadurai, a friend of Pulavar Palanichamy was accounted for advising circumvention of rules. Pingapani, the deputy educational officer, who inspected the high school, did not show interest in learning that the same campus had a primary school acting beyond rules. The other officers who were earlier responsible for permitting the nursery school against the rules during 1999, namely, Shanmughavelu, Sethuramachandran, Chandrasekharan, and Dr. Palanivelu. The Deputy elementary educational officer, Durairaj, and assistant elementary educational officer, Balakrishnan, were held less culpable for knowing about the thatched structure and the exaggerated attendance, but not initiating any action.

== Legal ==
The case trial started after a long delay on 24 September 2012 in the Thanjavur district sessions court. The case had 21 accused and had 488 witnesses that included 18 children affected in the accident. The headmaster, Prabharan, and three others turned approvers. There was a petition filed in the court to include the then collector of the district, J Radhakrishnan, and three others in the case, but it was dismissed. A total of 17 people were charge-sheeted in the case and were set to face trial. The seventeen included Pulavar Palanichamy, his wife and correspondent of school Saraswati, three teachers, six officers in the education department (elementary), the Kumbakonam municipal commissioner, town planning officer, and four assistants in the education department.

The education department officials were accused of negligence in their duties and the lower level officers for colluding with the officials to obtain and renew the licenses. The three teachers were accused of showing negligence in rescuing the children. Pulavar Palanichamy, Saraswati, and the three teachers filed petitions in the lower court to discharge them from the case. Their plea was dismissed both in the lower court and Madras High Court on 14 July 2012.

=== Verdict ===
The trial was concluded on 17 July 2014. On 30 July 2014, Thanjavur district session court sentenced school founder Pulavar Palanichamy to life imprisonment and fined ₹5,165,700 (US$54,000). Palanichamy's wife and school correspondent P Saraswathi, headmistress J Santhalakshmi, noon meal organizer R Vijayalakshmi, cook R Vasanthi were sentenced to five years imprisonment. Officials in the district elementary education office, officer R Balaji, his assistant S Sivaprakasam, superintendent T Thandavan, and assistant G Durairaj were also sentenced to five years in jail. Total fine of ₹5,257,000 (US$55,000) was imposed and ordered the compensation of ₹50,000 (US$520) to parents of each victim.

The chartered engineer, B Jayachandran was sentenced to two years of jail time and a fine of ₹50,000 (US$520) but later the court suspended his punishment. The court cleared charges of other eleven accused, including three teachers, six education department officials, and two municipality officers.

The bench of Madras High Court in Madurai allowed the appeal filed by the state government against the release of 11 accused in the case on 13 September 2014. The eleven who were acquitted by the Principal District Court were B. Palaniswamy, the District Elementary Educational Officer, R. Narayanaswamy, the District Educational Officer, J. Radhakrishnan, the Assistant Elementary Educational Officer, V. Balasubramanian, the Assistant Elementary Educational Officer (Nursery), K. Balakrishnan and G. Madhavan, Additional Assistant Elementary Educational Officers, P. Devi, R. Mahalakshmi, and T. Anthoniammal, the teachers of the school, R. Sathiyamoorthy, the then Kumbakonam Municipal Commissioner and K. Murugan, the Town Planning Officer.

== See also ==
- Mahamaham Stampede
