= Raja Veda Kavya Patasala, Kumbakonam =

School in Tamil Nadu, India

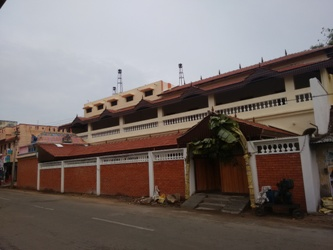
Raja Veda Kavya Patasala

Raja Veda Kavya Patasala is a Patasala also Paathasala (religious school) located at Kumbakonam, Thanjavur district of Tamil Nadu, India.

== Location ==
It is located on the southern banks of the Cauvery river.

== History ==
By the efforts of Govinda Dikshitar this Patasala was established. His other monumental works are the gopura and granary of Palaivananathar Temple, new shrines and gopura of Kumbeswarar Temple, and Ramaswamy Temple. Established in 1542 CE, this Patasala produced eminent scholars. To main this, in 1972 CE Advaitha Vidyacharya Maharaja Sahib Sri Govindha Dikshitar Punya Smarana Samethi was set up. The primary aim of this institution is to impart the knowledge of VEDAS and Sastric studies. This Patasala is continuing its services for the past 473 years without interruption. The three sects Smartha, Vaishnava and Madhwa without any discrimination undergo their respective Vedic studies here. The 480th annual day was celebrated on 8 May 2022.

== Classes ==
In this Patasala, classes are taken on four vedas for eight and ten years and certificates are issued to students. A student can continue his study in this institution, along with School education.

== Renovation ==
This was renovated in 1933 CE and on 1 November 2015.
