= Kumbakonam Degree Coffee =

Filter coffee preparation method

Kumbakonam Degree Coffee is a traditional way of preparing filter coffee that originates from Kumbakonam, in the Thanjavur District of the state of Tamil Nadu, India. Its speciality is the use of cows' milk without any adulterants.
