= Patteeswaram =

Village in Tamil Nadu, India

- Suburban
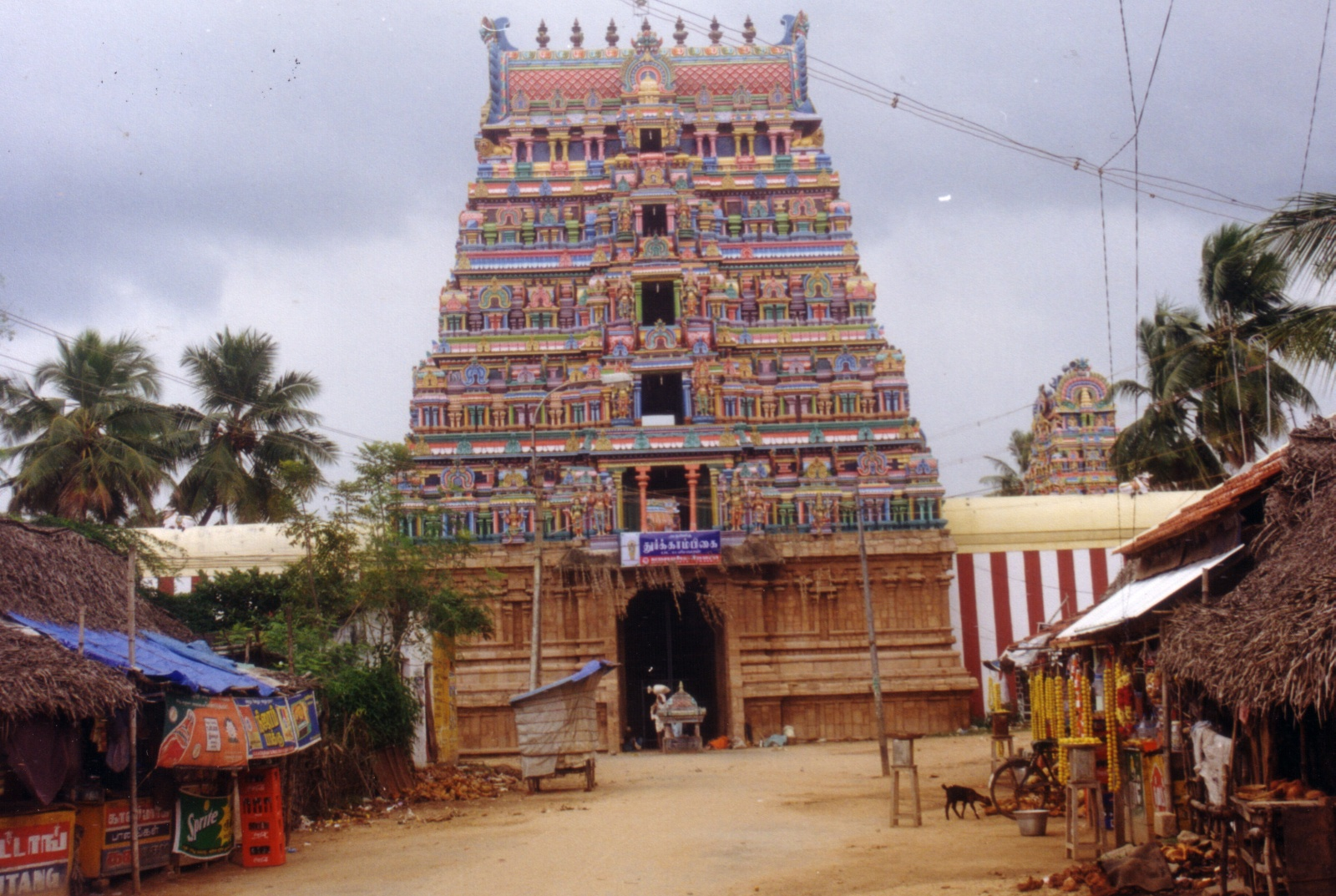
- Durgambikai temple gopuram in Patteeswaram, photograph taken in 1999

- Location in Tamil Nadu, India
- Coordinates: 10°55′33″N 79°20′42″E
- Country: India
- State: Tamil Nadu
- District: Thanjavur
- Taluk: Kumbakonam

Languages
  - Official: Tamil
- Time zone: UTC+5:30 (IST)
- Postal code: 612703
- Vehicle registration: TN 68, TN 49

Patteeswaram is a village, 8 kilometres (5.0 mi) from Kumbakonam in the state of Tamil Nadu in India. The village was named after Patti (also called Nandini), the calf of Kamadhenu, the divine cow in Hindu mythology. It is the suburban region of Kumbakonam city in Thanjavur district. It has the famous temples like Thenupuriswarar Temple of Lord Shiva and Durga and Kothandaramaswamy Temple. This village was very important time in history as so many kings had built these temples in various periods of history.

== Patteswaram village ==
Name of Taluk	Kumbakonam
Population	16,001
Mode of transportation	Bus
Travel time to district	2 hours
Distance from district	50 km
Distance from RBH	8 km
Tributary	Mudikondan
Main occupation of men	Agriculture
Main occupation of women	Agriculture
Non-Farm source income	Weaving silk sarees
Cost of 1-acre (4,000 m^{2}) of land	Rs. 1,200,000
Crops	Paddy, sugarcane, coconut
Crop cycles	2
Distance to the school	0.5 km
Number of students in the school	1,800
Number of teachers	40
Clinics	4
Number of certified doctors	3
PHC in village	yes
Number of pharmacies	2
Distance to hospital	8 km
Rate of interest charged by moneylenders	4%
Number of self-help groups	60
Rent of 200 square feet (19 m^{2}) shop	1,500
Government schemes offered	NREGS

== Temples ==
The village is famous for two temples Thenupuriswarar Temple and Kothandaramaswamy Temple. Both the temples are historically and religiously important. Thenupuriswarar Temple is revered in the 7th century Tamil Saiva canonical work, the Tevaram, written by Tamil saint poets known as the Nayanars and classified as Paadal Petra Sthalam. The temple is associated with the legend of Sambandar to whose view Nandi moved to have a direct view of the presiding deity. Muthupandal festival celebrated in the temple in associated with the legend. During this Muthupandal festival Sambandar Visits Kothandaramaswamy Temple and gets a divine Silk Shall from the temple which shows the diversity between Shaivism and Vaishnavism in this village.

Brahmanandeesvarar Temple is another temple in the village, dedicated to Shiva. It is located near the Thirumalairajan River.
