= Govinda Dikshita =

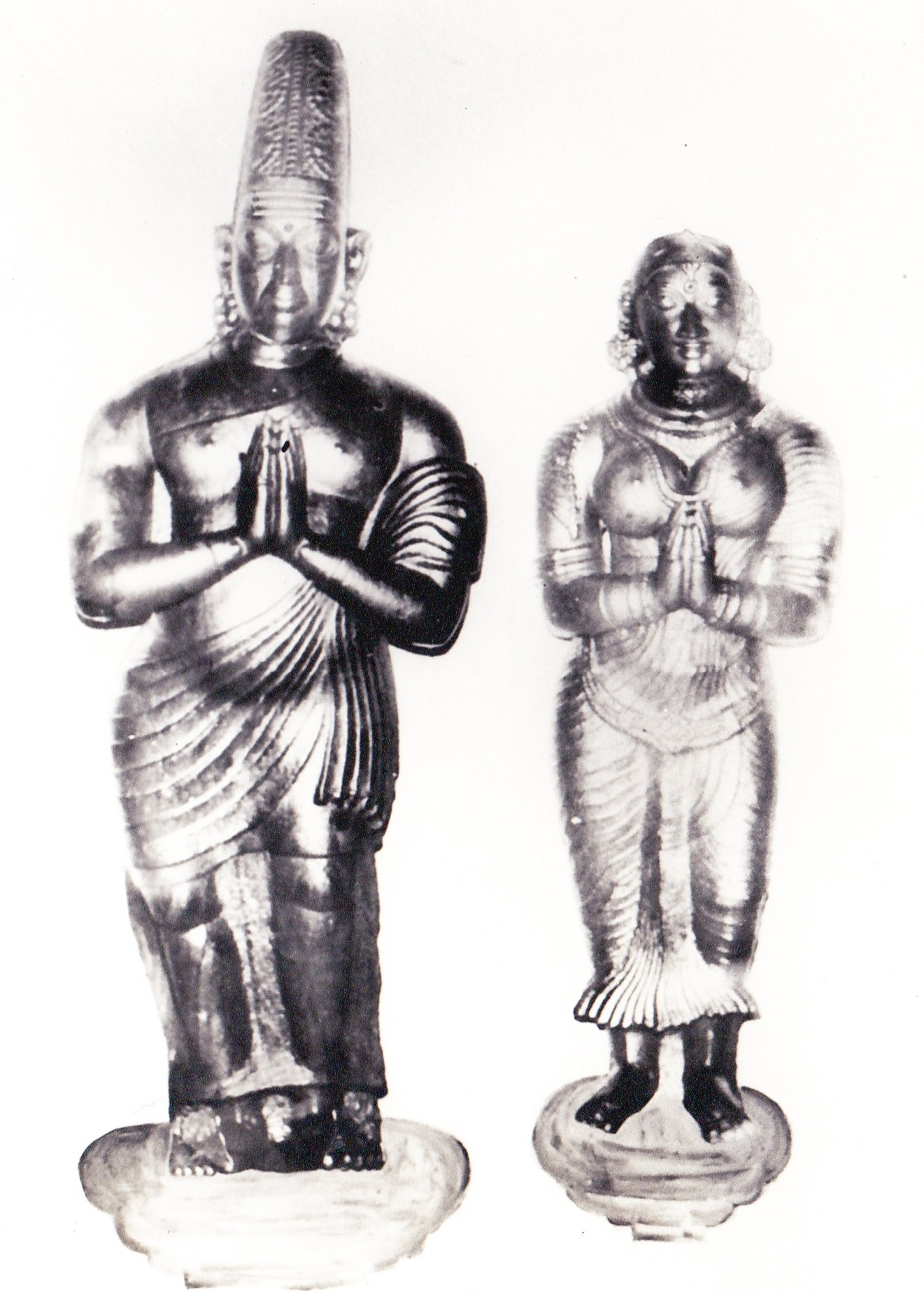
Image of Dikshitar

Govinda Dikshita (Dikshitar) was the minister of three successive Nayaks of Thanjavur, who ruled the region of Thanjavur in South India between the 16th and 17th centuries CE.

== About the scholar ==
Govinda Dikshita was a scholar, philosopher, statesman and musicologist. He was a Kannadiga (native Kannada language speaker) belonging to the Hoysala Karnataka Brahmin community, although he served as a minister in the region of Thanjavur under Achuthappa Nayak and Raghunatha Nayak. He lived in a palatial house in Patteeswaram, the remnants of which are believed to exist. This versatile genius and erudite scholar composed Arivamsa Saracharitram and Sangitha Sudhanidhi(a treatise on music). He is credited with the construction and repair of the Amman shrine of Thenupuriswarar Temple at Patteeswaram. The sculpture of Dikshita and his wife, holding their hands in adoration, are found in the mandap in front of the Amman shrine.

Legend associates him with Tirunageswaram, a village located 6 km from Kumbakonam in the Kumbakonam - Karaikal road and also with Patteswaram, 6 km south east of Kumbakonam. The name of his wife is ascertained as Nagamba. But the presence of the idol of Dikshita in the premises of Patteswaram temple and presence of ruins of his house in the village outskirts confirm his private location to be Patteeswaram. His location is also believed to be Tirupalathurai, near Papanasam. Life like images of Govinda Dikshithar is now worshipped at Patteswaram, with the presiding deity of Linga also called "Govinda Dikshita lingam". Dikshita spent his early years in Vijayanagara kingdom where he attained his education. Dikshita is a Karnataka Brahmin of Asvalayana sutra of Rig veda.

== Carnatic Music ==
Dikshita is spoken of as 'One of the Trio of Theoreticians' of modern period; the others being Ramamatya and Somanatha. The Nayaks brought with them the glorious tradition of their country to the fertile regions of river Cauvery. The Nayaks donated an entire village to 500 Brahmin families for fostering art and learning. Other fertile villages were encouraged to become seats of music and learning as Nayaks gave them to Telugu families. Muvanallur, Tepperumanallur, Sulamangalam, Uthukadu and Saliyamangalam can be cited as examples.

Govinda Dikshita was the father of another musicologist, Venkatamakhin, who is noted for his Chaturdandiprakashika, a treatise which formed the basis of the melakarta system of classification used in Carnatic music today.

== Construction ==
Dikshita is believed to have constructed the Ramaswamy Temple, Kumbakonam. In 1620, when Govinda Dikshita, divan-administrator for the Nayaks, constructed the Ramaswamy Temple, Kumbakonam, he added a commercial corridor between the new temple and the older Chakrapani Temple, Kumbakonam. In 1542, Dikshita founded Raja Veda Kavya Patashala in Kumbakonam, which is even today a centre for learning Vedic education.
