= Thirumalairajan River =

River in Tamil Nadu, India

Thirumalairajan is a river flowing in the Thanjavur, Tiruvarur and Nagapattinam districts of the Indian state of Tamil Nadu and Karaikal district of Puducherry. The river splits from Kudamurutti, a tributary of Kaveri river at Rajagiri near Papanasam, Thanjavur district. The river enters Bay of Bengal at Tirumalarajanpattinam near Karaikal.The river has a 150 years old bridge built by a king, who ruled the nearby places of the river.The bridge is also named after the river, the thirumalairajan river bridge.

== See also ==
List of rivers of Tamil Nadu
