= Erwadi fire incident =

2001 fire in a mental asylum in Erwadi, Tamil Nadu, India

Coordinates: 9°51′00″N 78°51′04″E

- Charred remains of the victims and the Moideen Badusha Mental Home at Erwadi
- Date: 6 August 2001
- Location: Erwadi, Tamil Nadu, India
- Deaths: 28

The Erwadi fire incident was an incident that occurred on 6 August 2001, when 28 inmates of a faith-based mental asylum died in the fire. All these inmates were bound by chains at the Moideen Badusha Mental Home in Erwadi village in Tamil Nadu, India.

A large number of mental homes existed in Erwadi which was famous for the dargah of Quthbus Sultan Syed Ibrahim Shaheed Valiyullah, a Moroccan who came to India to propagate Islam. Various people believe that holy water from the dargah and oil from the lamp burning there have the power to cure all illnesses, especially mental problems. The treatment also included frequent caning, beatings supposedly conducted to "drive away the evil". During the day, patients were tied to trees with thick ropes. At night, they were tied to their beds with iron chains. The patients awaited a divine command in their dreams to go back home. For the command to come, it was expected to take anywhere from two months to several years.

As the number of people seeking cure at dargah increased, homes were set up by individuals to reportedly take care of the patients. Most of these homes were set up by people who themselves had come to Erwadi seeking cure for their relatives.

The origins of the fire are unknown, but once it spread, there was little hope of saving most of the 45 inmates, who were chained to their beds in the ramshackle shelter in which they slept, though such shackling was against Indian law. Some inmates whose shackles were not as tight escaped, and five people were hospitalized for severe burns. The bodies of the dead were not identifiable.

== Aftermath ==
All mental homes of this type were closed on 13 August 2001, and more than 500 inmates were placed under the care of the Government of India. As per Supreme Court directions, a commission headed by N. Ramdas was set up to enquire into these deaths. The commission recommended that care of mentally ill people is to be improved, that anybody wishing to set up a mental home be required to obtain a license, and that all inmates be unchained.

In 2007, the owner of the Moideen Badusha Mental Home for the Mentally Challenged, his wife and two relatives were sentenced to seven years imprisonment by a magistrate Court.
