= Saptha Stana Temples =

Hindu temples in Tamil Nadu, India

Saptha Stana Temples are a group of seven temples. In Tamil Nadu, India, such groups of temples are found in many places, particularly in and around Thanjavur District.

Om symbol Tiruvaiyaru Saptha Stana Temples Om symbol
The seven important temples in and around Thiruvaiyaru
Temple	Location
Aiyarappar temple	Thiruvaiyaru
Apathsahayar Temple	Thirupazhanam
Odhanavaneswarar Temple	Tiruchotruturai
Vedapuriswarar Temple	Thiruvedhikudi
Kandeeswarar Temple	Thirukkandiyur
Puvananathar Temple	Thirupanturuthi
Neyyadiappar Temple	Tillaistanam

== Saptha Stana ==
Saptha + Stana means seven sacred places. The temples found in these places are known as Saptha Stana Temples.

== Tiruvaiyaru Saptha Stana Temples ==
Having Tiruvaiyaru as the primary temple, seven temples belonging to seven places are also referred as the ashramas of seven Munipunkavars (Saptarishi). These rishis are Agastya, Atri, Bhardwaja, Gautam, Jamadagni, Vashistha and Vishvamitra. They set up ashrams in Aiyarappar temple, Apathsahayar Temple, Odhanavaneswarar Temple, Vedapuriswarar Temple, Kandeeswarar Temple, Puvananathar Temple and Neyyadiappar Temple. Ayyarappa, the main deity of Thiruvaiyaru took with them Nandhidevar-Suyasambikai to these seven ashrams in order to get the blessings of the rishis.

=== Nandikeswara Festival ===
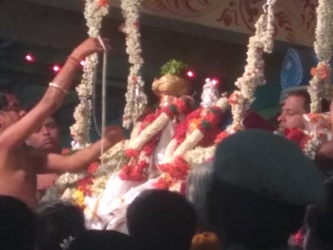
Nandikeswara wedding Festival

Just before the festival wedding festival of Nandikeswara took place. Nandikeswara was the son of Silakitha Munivar. In order to get married off him to Suyasambikai of Tirumazhapadi, Ayyarappar along with His consort go to Tirumazhapadi on a glass palanquin. On that night itself Ayyarappar along with newly wedded couples crosses Kollidam and reaches Thiruvaiyaru.

=== Saptha Stana Festival ===
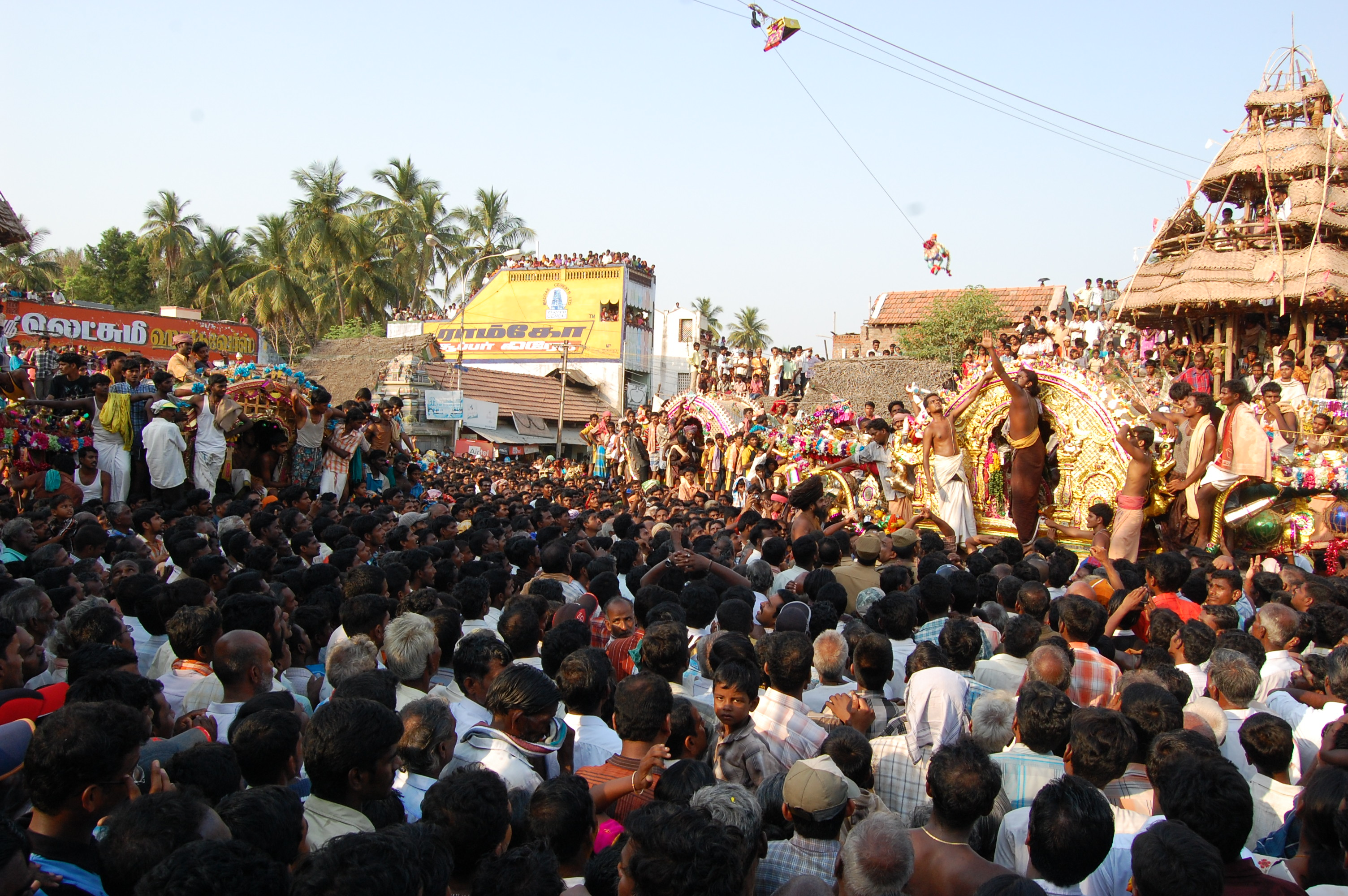
Poochorithal (flower festival)

In the decorated palanquin Ayyarappar along with His consort will leave Thiruvaiyaru and go to the other six connected temples during the festival of Saptha Stana. At that time, the palanquins of the respective temples will join with the Ayyarappar Palanquin. This festival is conducted at Tiruvaiyaru during April every year. As per Hindu legend, it is the wedding festival of Nandikeswara, the sacred bull of Shiva on the Punarpoosa star during the Tamil month of Panguni. The festival deity of Aiyarappar temple of Thiruvaiyaru is carried in a decorated glass palanquin along with the images of Nandikeswara and Suyasayambikai to the temples in Thirupazhanam, Thiruchottruthurai, Thiruvedhikudi, Thirukandiyur and Thirupoonthurthi. Each of the festival deities of the respective temples mounted in glass palanquins accompany Aiyarppar on the way to the final destiny, Thillaistanam. There is a grand display of fireworks in Cauvery riverbed outside Thillaistanam temple. The seven palanquins are carried to Aiyarappar temple in Thiruvaiyyaru. Hundreds of people witness the convergence of seven glass palanquins carrying principal deities of respective temples from seven places at Tiruvaiyaru. The devotees perform Poochorithal (flower festival) in which a doll offers flowers to the principal deities in the palanquins. After the Poochorithal, the palanquins leave for their respective temples.

== Other Saptha Stana Temples ==
There are other Saptha Stana Temples in and around Thanjavur district. They are known as Chakkarapalli Saptha Stana Temples, Mayiladuthurai Saptha Stana Temples, Kumbakonam Saptha Stana Temples, Karanthai (near Thanjavur) Saptha Stana Temples, Tirunallur Saptha Stana Temples, Tiruneelakkudi Saptha Stana Temples, Kanjanur Saptha Stana Temples and Nagapattinam Saptha Stana Temples. As the palanquin of the Kumbeswara Temple was in a damaged condition the festival did not take place for some time. Later the trial run was held on 7 February 2016 Following the Tirttavari in Mahamaham tank in Kumbakonam during 2016 Mahamaham the festival was held on 23 April 2016. It is learnt that the Karanthanttankudi festival was not held for some years.
