= Neyyadiappar Temple, Tillaistanam =

Shiva temple in Thanjavur district, Tamil Nadu, India

Tillaistanam
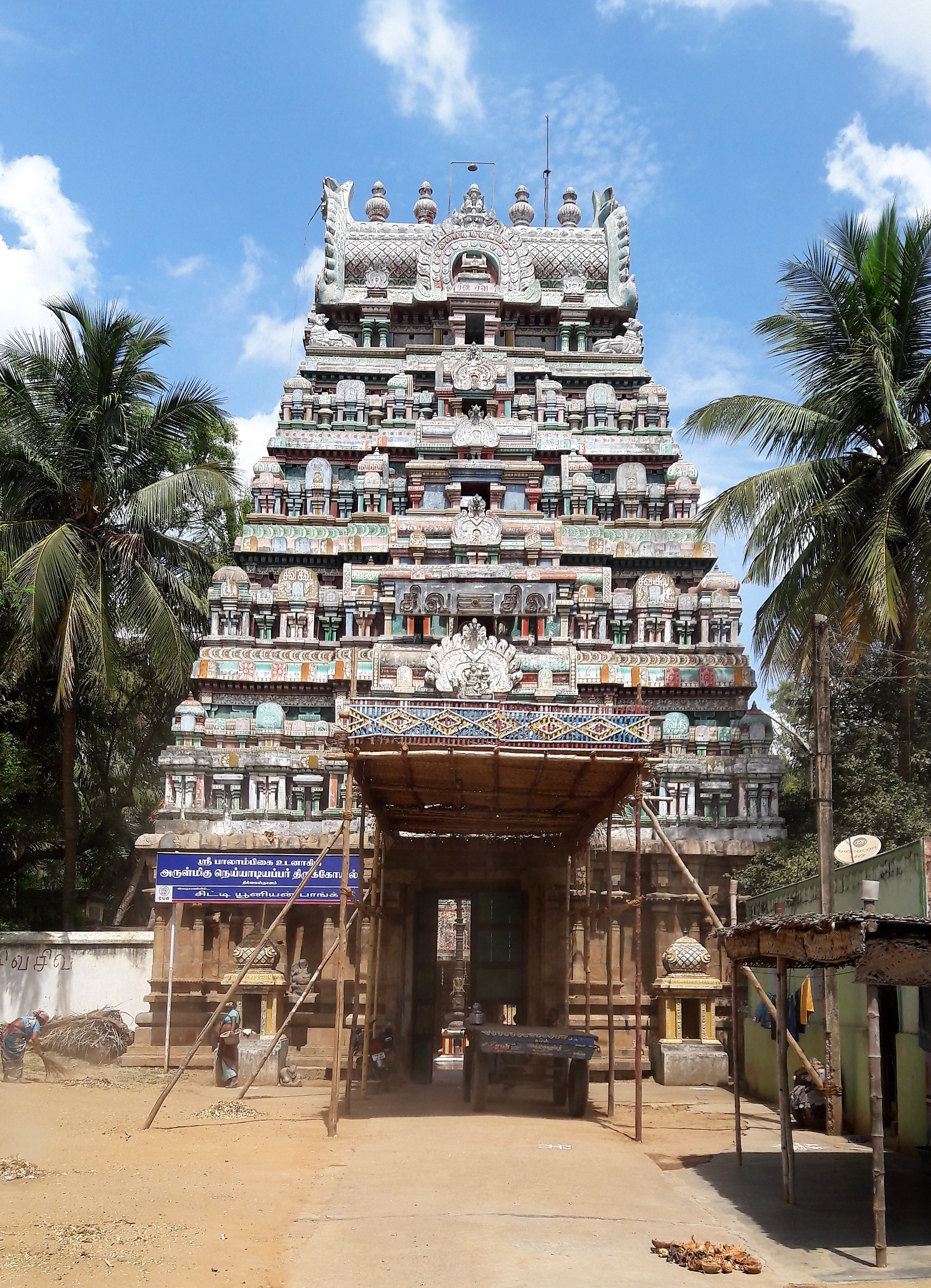

- Location in Tamil Nadu

Religion
- Affiliation: Hinduism
- District: Tanjore
- Deity: Neyyidaiappar (Shiva)

Location
- Location: Tillaistanam
- State: Tamil Nadu
- Country: India
- Coordinates: 10°53′N 79°06′E

Architecture
- Type: Dravidian architecture

Neyyadiappar Temple, Tillaistanam is a Hindu temple dedicated to Shiva located in the village of Thillaisthanam also known as Tillaisthanam or Thiruneithanam in Tamil Nadu, India. It is significant to the Hindu sect of Shaivism as one of the Saptasthanam, the seven temples associated with Aiyarappar temple in Thiruvaiyaru. Shiva is represented by the lingam in the form of Neyyadiappar. His consort Parvati is depicted as Piraisoodi Amman. The presiding deity is revered in the 7th century CE Tamil Shaiva canonical work, the Tevaram, written by Tamil saint poets known as the nayanars and classified as Paadal Petra Sthalam.

The temple is believed to have been built by Aditya Chola I during 9th century CE and with significant additions from later Chola kings and by the ruling kings of Thanjavur Nayaks. It houses five-tiered gateway towers known as gopurams. The temple has numerous shrines, with those of Neyyadiappar and Amman being the most prominent.

== History ==
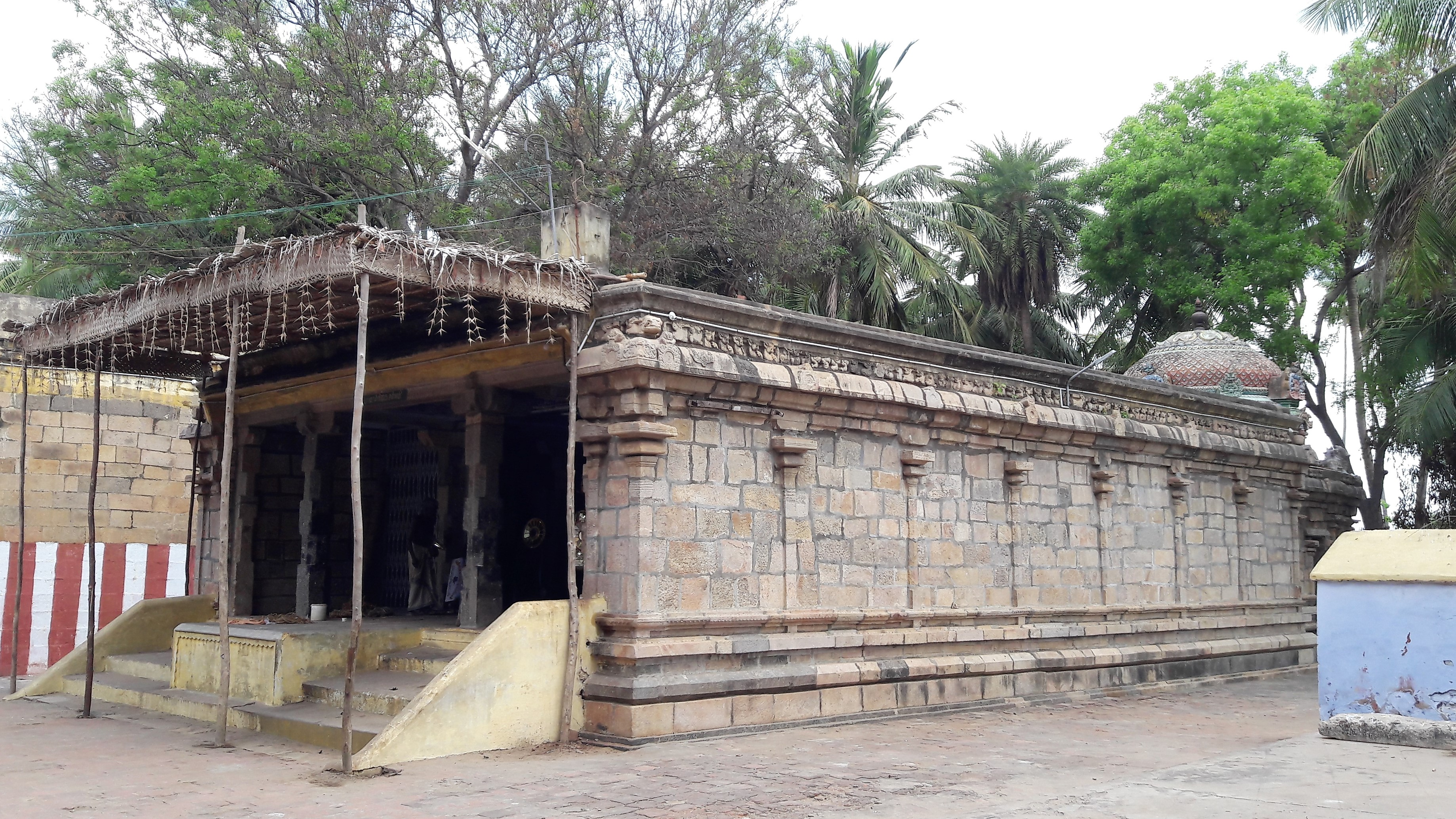
The Amman shrine in the second precinct

The temple has received contributions from various ruling kings from Pandyas, Pallava, Chola, Chera and from Irukkehvel family. The temple in its current form is believed to have been built during the 9th century by Chola king Aditya I based on various inscriptions in the temple. The earliest inscription in the temple is dated to AD 862 to the fourth year of Pandya king Marajadaiyan. Marajadaiyan is evidently Varaguna Pandiyan II who made extensive conquest of Chola territory. The two inscriptions in the two jambs on the temple indicating gift of 423 kasum to the presiding deity. The inscription in the opposite jamb indicates gift of 60 kalanjus of gold for lighting lamps in the temple by Pallava king Nandivarman III. An undated epigraph indicates hundred sheep to the temple, possibly by Aditya I.A record of golden lamp to the temple during the 8th regnal year of Parantaka I. Some of the other inscriptions indicate gifts from Aditya's son Kannaradeva, Parantaka's son Arulkulakesari, the Chola queens Tennavan Mahadevi and Tavayur Kilaradigal. The inscriptions from Parantaka I indicates enquiries about the temple and Tiruvisakam festival during the Tamil month of Vaikasi. The inscriptions also indicate that they have to be placed in the southern side of the Ardhamandapa, leading to the conclusion that the structure was built during the reign of Aditya I.

== Architecture ==
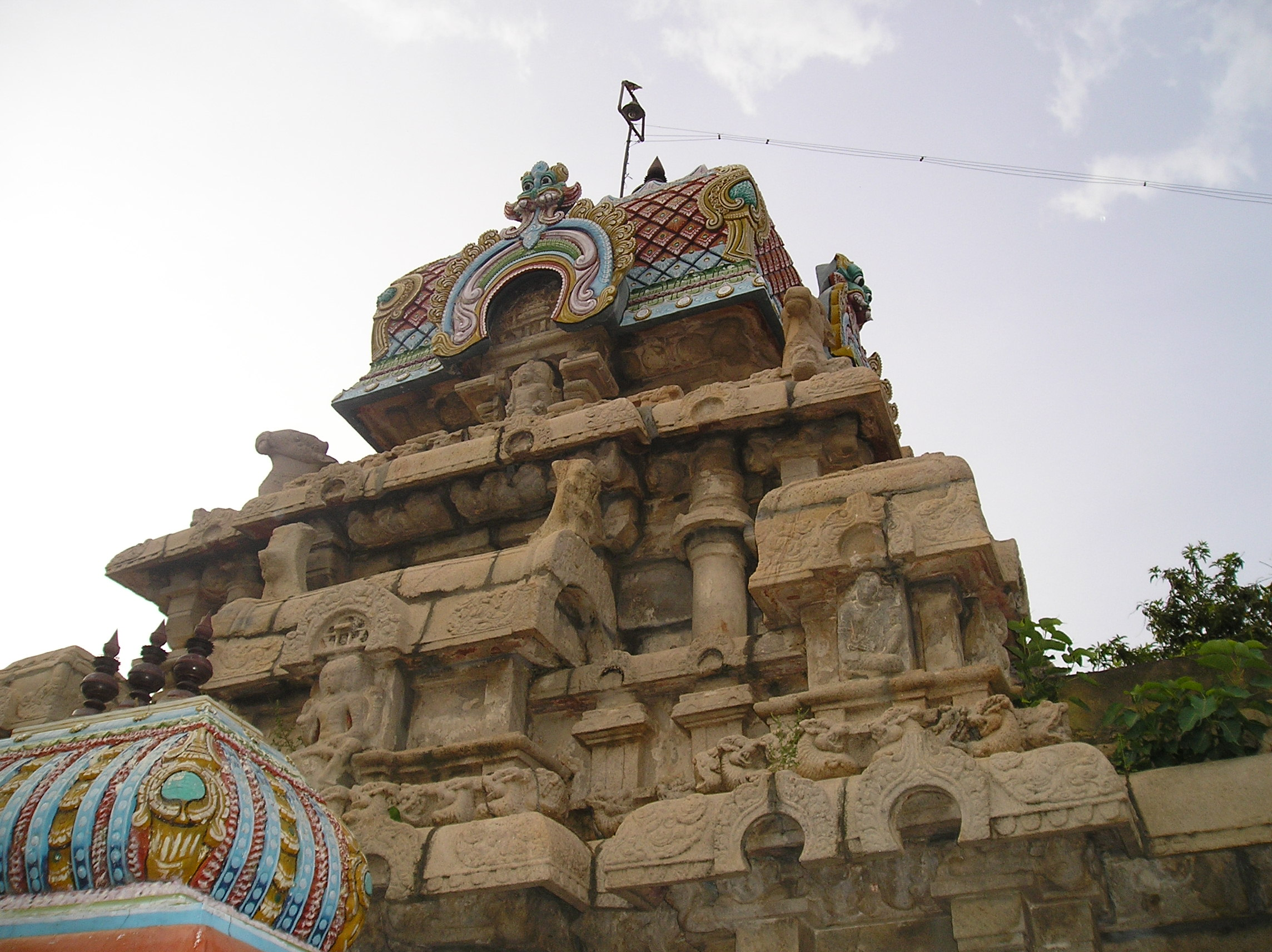
The vimana, the pyramidal roof over the sanctum

The temple is located 21 km away from Kumbakonam on the Kumbakonam- Tiruvaiyaru- Tanjore road. The temple is 3 km away from Thirukkandiyur. It houses five-tiered gateway towers known as gopurams. The temple has numerous shrines, with those of Neyyadiappar and Balambigai Amman being the most prominent. The temple has two precincts with the Amman shrine located in the second precinct in a South facing shine. The Amman shrine is dated to 13th century. The shrine houses the image of Balambigai in standing posture and is sported holding Akshamala and Padma in her hands, which are usually local features.

The presiding deity is housed in the east facing central shrine located axial to the gateway tower. The sanctum (garbhagriha) has a square plan with a dimension of 6 m (20 ft) and is surmounted by a dvitala vimana (pyramidal roof), an all stone structure. The pyramidal roof is interspersed with niches with tetragonal semi-pilasters. The corner bays have octagonal bases, while the central bays having circular ones. The two circular pilasters with circular shafts on four sides of the vimana indicates the antiquity of the temple. The feature is possibly termed Vrittasputitas in silpa texts like Shilparatna. Such a feature is otherwise found only in few other temples like Tiruttalinathar Temple in Thiruputhur, central shrine in Moovar Koil in Kodumbalur, Vijayalaya Choleeswaram in Narthamalai, Anantheswara temple in Udayarkudi and Kampaheswarar Temple, Thirubuvanam. In the first level of the vimana, there are niches of Dakshinamurthy in the south, a seated four-armed Vishnu in the west and a seated four-armed Brahma in the north. There are a number of old images like Sattanatha, Devakosha on the vimana. The niches of the karnakutas of the first tala contains images of a kneeling man on the left and a kneeling lady in the right. Such a feature is otherwise found in Dandeeswarar Temple in Velachery and Vadathirthesvarar Temple, Andanallur in Tiruchendurai.

The arthamandapa, the hall preceding the sanctum has a rectangular plan and has the same style of the sanctum. The entrance of the arthamandapa houses the six-foot images of two dvarapalas, the guardian deities on either sides. The hall has four pillars, with two of them being old ones with octagonal shafts. The hall in front of the arthamandapa is called the mahamandapa and has a five-aisled structure. The mukhamandapa, the hall in front of the arthamandapa is five-aisled and has plain pillars. There are two pillars in the hall with fluted shafts and sedated lions at the base, an architectural feature attributed to early period.

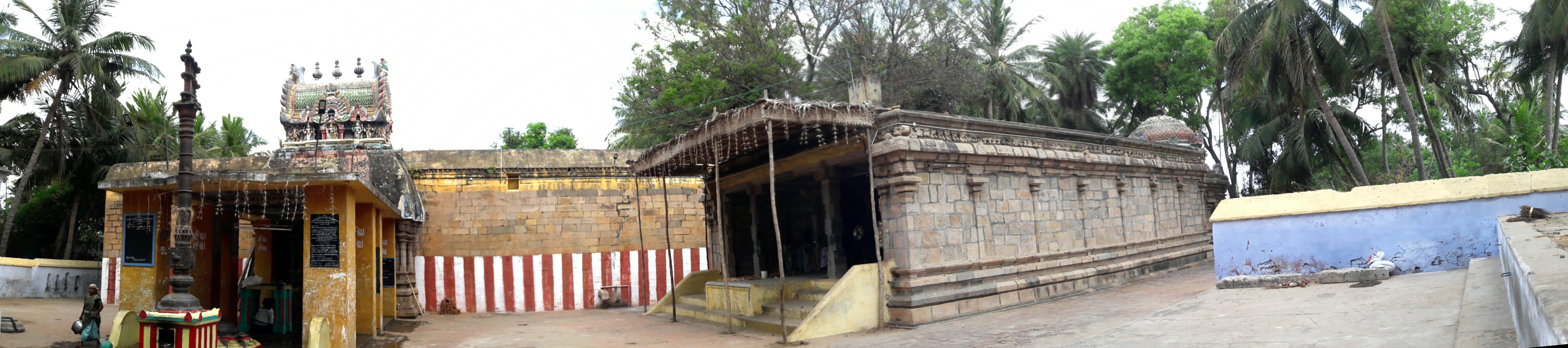
Panoramic view of the temple

== Saptha Stanam ==
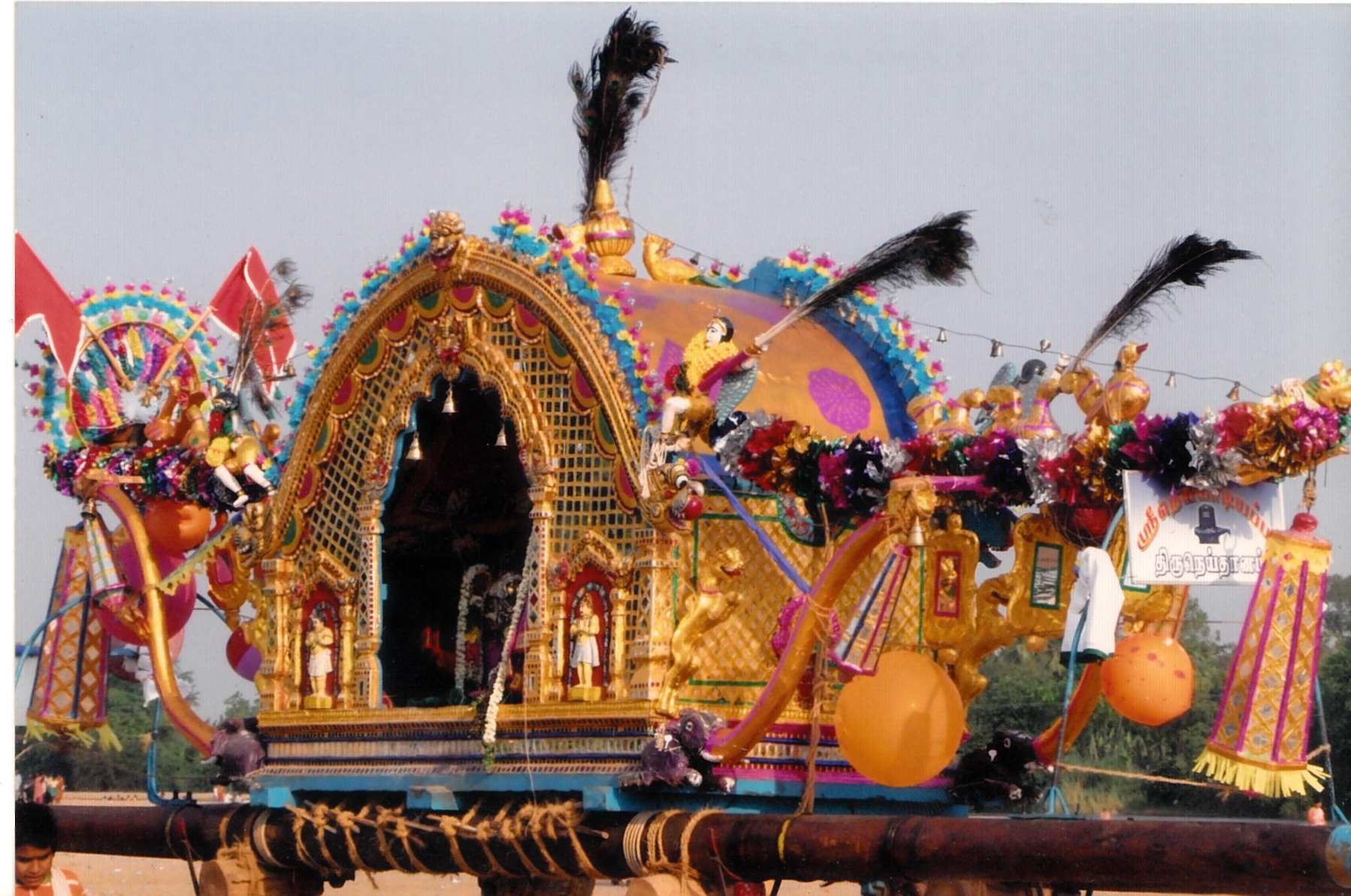
The decorated palanquin used during the festival

Om symbol Sapthastanam Om symbol
The seven important temples in and around Thiruvaiyaru
Temple	Location
Aiyarappar temple	Thiruvaiyaru
Apathsahayar Temple	Thirupazhanam
Odhanavaneswarar Temple	Tiruchotruturai
Vedapuriswarar Temple	Thiruvedhikudi
Kandeeswarar Temple	Thirukkandiyur
Puvananathar Temple	Thirupanturuthi
Neyyadiappar Temple	Tillaistanam

The sapthasthanam festival is conducted at Tiruvaiyaru during April every year. As per Hindu legend, it is the wedding festival of Nandikeswara, the sacred bull of Shiva on the Punarpoosa star during the Tamil month of Panguni. The festival deity of Aiyarappar temple of Thiruvaiyaru is carried in a decorated glass palanquin along with the images of Nandikeswara and Suyasayambikai to the temples in Thirupazhanam, Thiruchottruthurai, Thiruvedhikudi, Thirukandiyur and Thirupoonthurthi. Each of the festival deities of the respective temples mounted in glass palanquins accompany Aiyarppar on the way to the final destiny, Thillaistanam. There is a grand display of fireworks in Cauvery riverbed outside Thillaistanam temple. The seven palanquins are carried to Aiyarappar temple in Thiruvaiyyaru. Hundreds of people witness the convergence of seven glass palanquins carrying principal deities of respective temples from seven places at Tiruvaiyaru. The devotees perform Poochorithal (flower festival) in which a doll offers flowers to the principal deities in the palanquins. After the Poochorithal, the palanquins leave for their respective temples.

== Literary mention ==
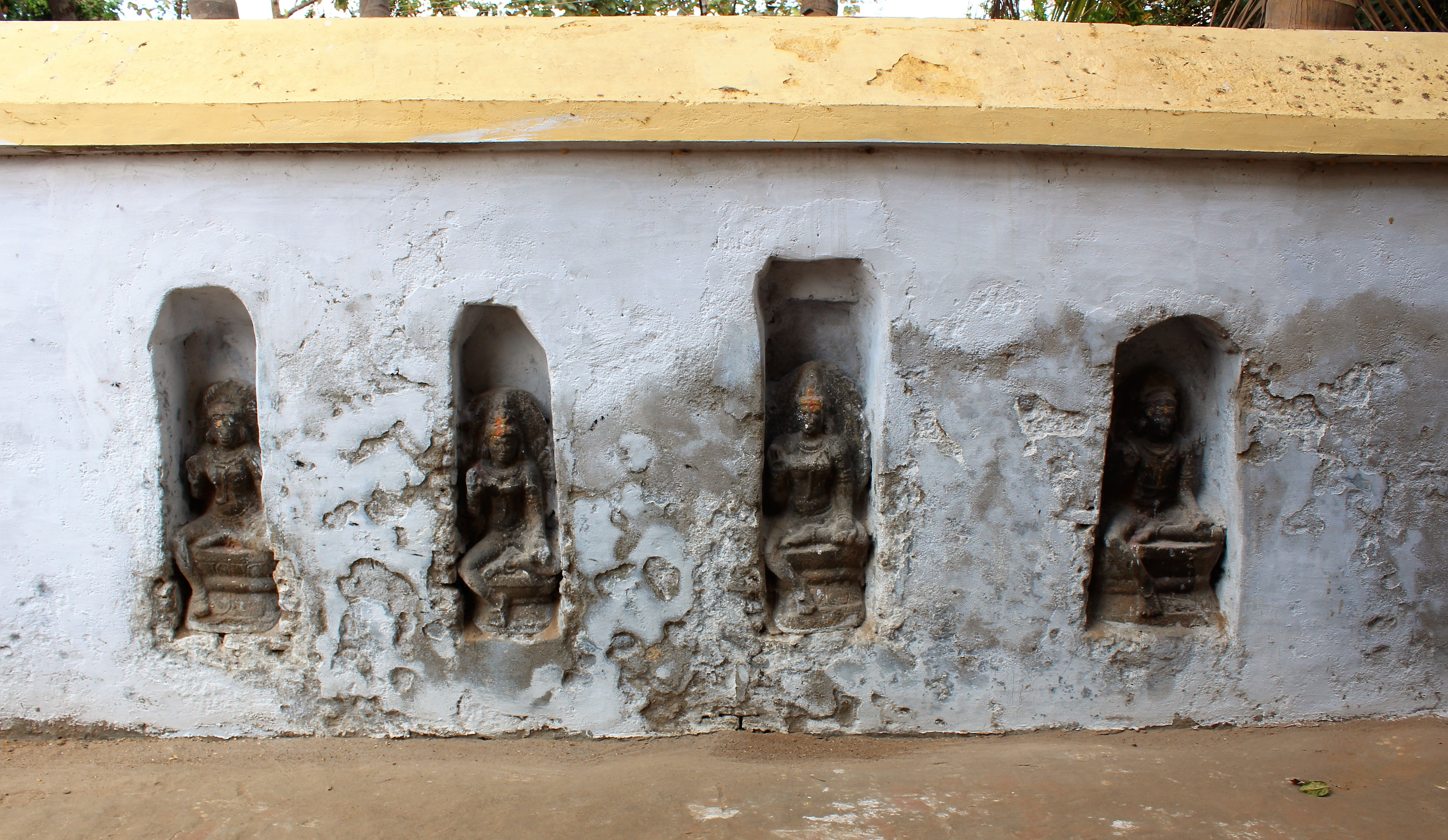
Images of the sculptures in the second precinct

Tirugnana Sambandar, a 7th-century Tamil Shaivite poet, mentioned Naganathar in ten verses in Tevaram, compiled as the First Tirumurai. Appar, a contemporary of Sambandar, also mentioned Neyyadiappar in 10 verses in Tevaram, compiled as the Fifth Tirumurai. As the temple is mentioned in Tevaram, it is a Paadal Petra Sthalam, one of the 275 temples in the Saiva canon. The temple is the 52nd in the list of temples in the northern banks of Cauvery. It is one of the temples on the northern banks of River Kaveri.
