= Apathsahayar Temple, Thirupazhanam =

Shiva temple in Thanjavur district, Tamil Nadu, India

Apathsahayar Temple
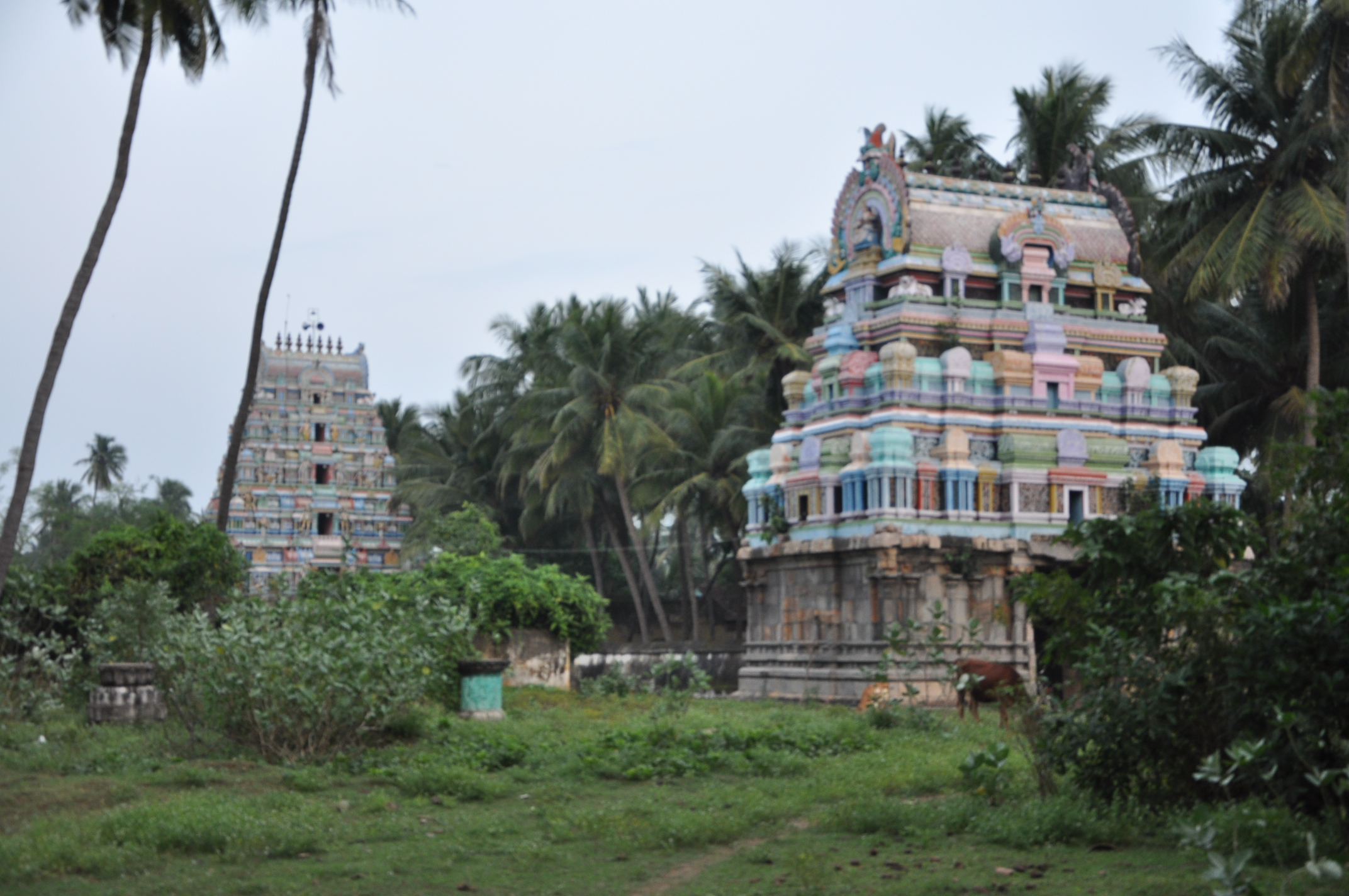

- Location in Tamil Nadu

Religion
- Affiliation: Hinduism
- District: Thanjavur
- Deity: Apathsahayar (Shiva)

Location
- Location: Thirupazhanam
- State: Tamil Nadu
- Country: India
- Coordinates: 10°53′34″N 79°8′19″E

Architecture
- Type: Dravidian architecture

Apathsahayar Temple, Thirupazhanam is a Hindu temple dedicated to Shiva located in Thirupazhanam near Tiruvaiyaru, Tamil Nadu, India. The presiding deity is revered in the 7th century Tamil Saiva canonical work, the Tevaram, written by Tamil poet-saints known as the nayanars and classified as Paadal Petra Sthalam. The temple is counted as the earliest of all Chola temples.

There are many inscriptions associated with the temple indicating contributions from Cholas, Thanjavur Nayaks and Thanjavur Maratha kingdom. The oldest parts of the present masonry structure were built during the Chola dynasty in the 9th century, while later expansions, including the towering gopuram gatehouses, are attributed to later periods, up to the Thanjavur Nayaks during the 16th century.

The temple complex is one of the largest in the state and it houses four gateway towers known as gopurams. The temple has numerous shrines, with those of Apathshayar and Periyanayagi being the most prominent. The temple complex houses many halls and three precincts; the most notable is the second precinct built during the Vijayanagar period that has many sculptures. The temple is maintained and administered by Hindu Religious and Charitable Endowments Department of the Government of Tamil Nadu.

== Legend ==
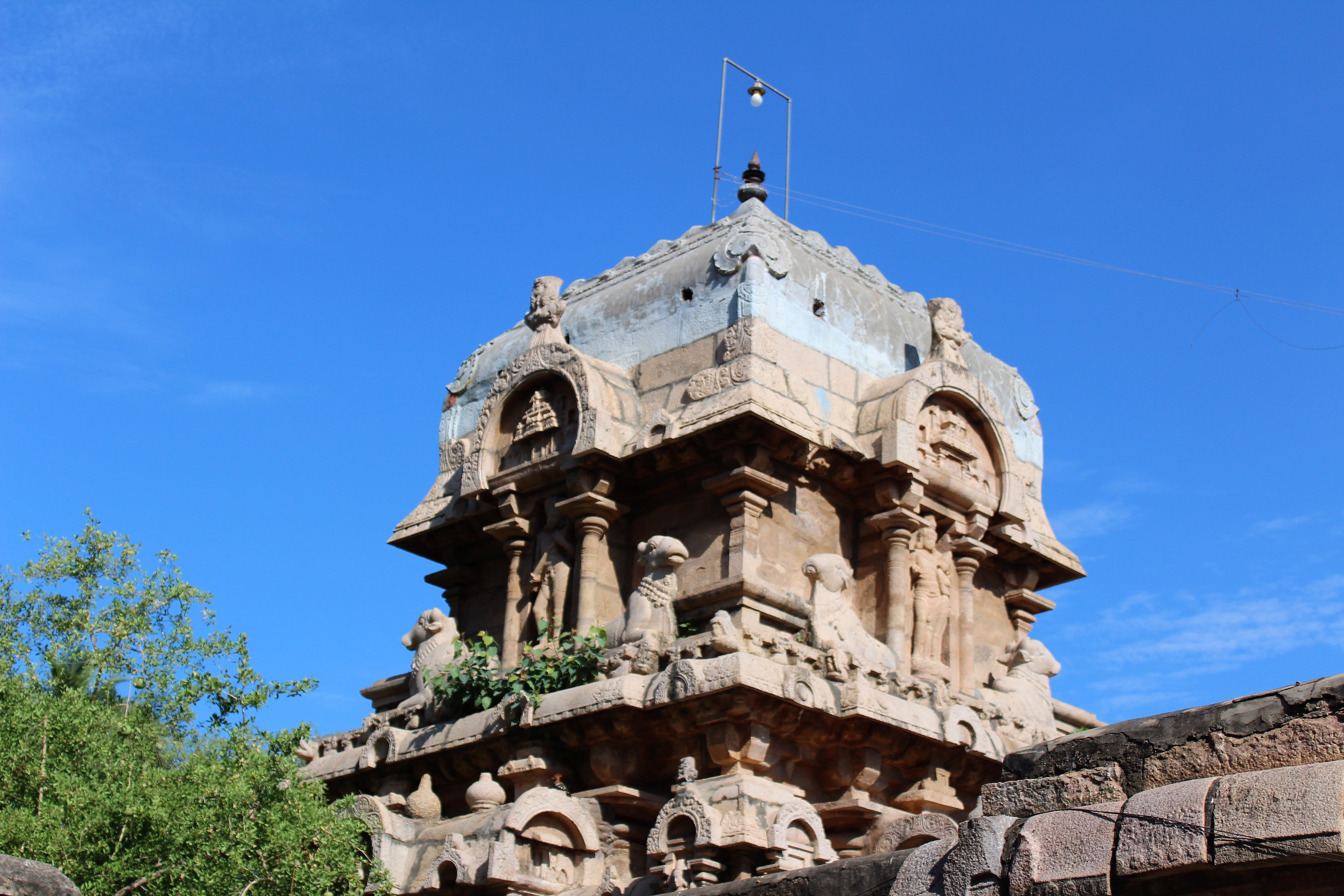
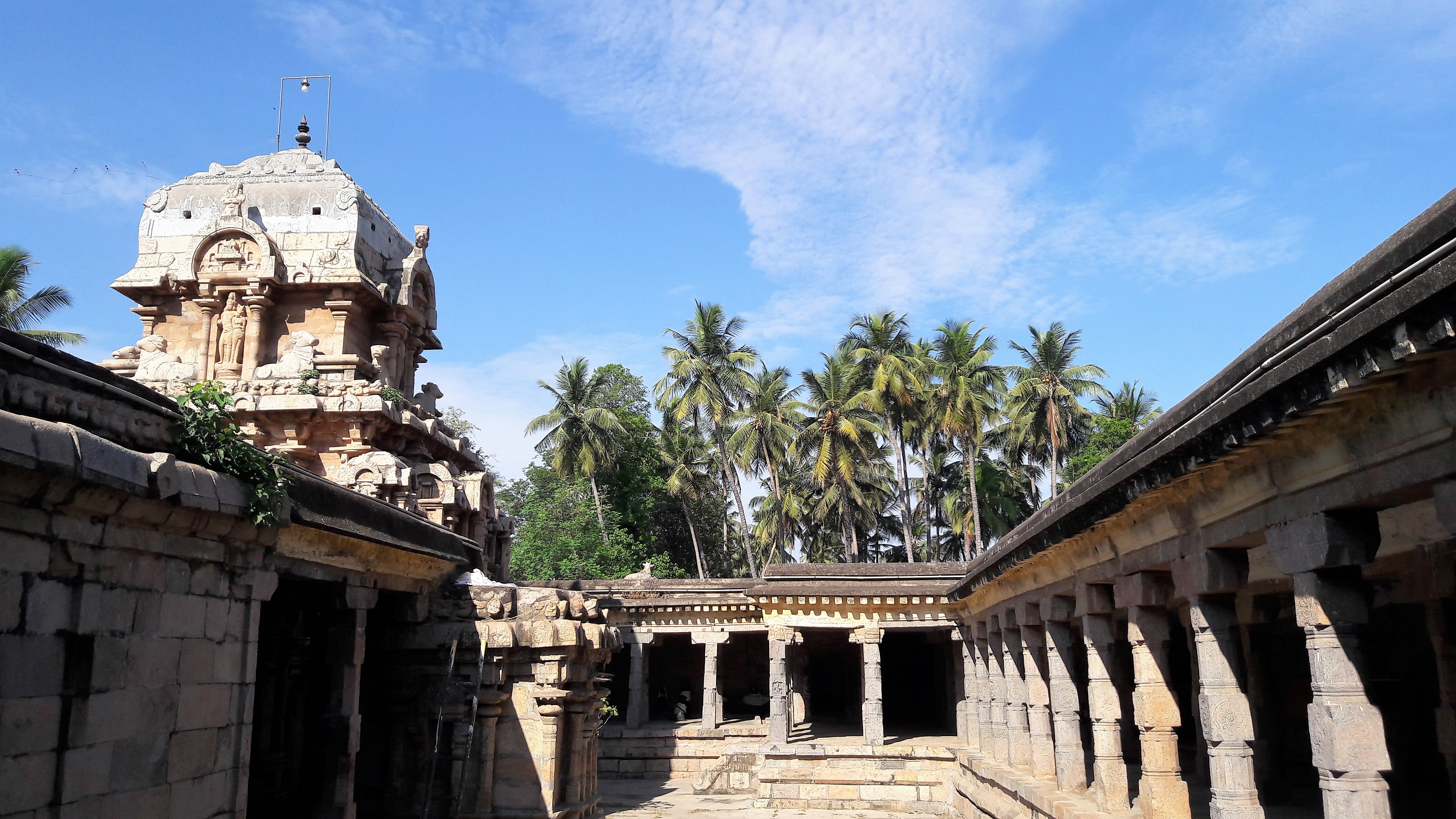
Shrines of the temple

The temple is revered by the hymns of 7th century Tamil saint poet, Appar The temple and the place is associated with Apoothi Adigal, an ardent devotee of Saiva saint Appar (Thirunavukkarasar). Apoothi Adigal was an ardent devotee of Shiva and saint Appar without even having met him once. He built various resting houses in the village in the name of Thirunavukkarasar. He also named all his sons as Thirunavukkarasar. Appar, during his visit to various temples, visited the place and was surprised to see so many welfare institutes named after him. Apoothi Adigal was very much pleased to meet Appar and arranged a grand feast. When one of his sons went to pluck plantain leaf, he was bitten by a snake and was killed. Appar is believed to have prayed to Apathsahayar, the presiding deity of the temple and pleased by his devotion, the boy was brought back to life by Apathsahyar.

== Architecture ==
The temple is located 31 km away from Kumbakonam on the Kumbakonam-Tiruvaiyaru-Tanjore road. The temple is 2 km away from Tiruvaiyaru. Kandeeswarar has a five-tiered rajagopuram, a three-tiered gopuram internally and an East facing sanctum. The sanctum lies axial to the temple gateway and the flag staff, which is located after the gopuram in the second precinct. The shrine of Ambal is south facing and she is sported in standing posture. There are shrines of Vinayagar, Murugan with Valli & Deivanai, Mahalakshmi and Vishnu Durgai. The images of Brahma, Lingodhbhavar and Dakshinamurthy are located in the planks around the sanctum. The sanctum is guarded by Dvarapalas and the festival images of temple are housed in the Mukhamandapa. In the halls in the first precinct, there are various lingas and a shrine for Venugopala. Jackfruit tree is the temple tree and is located in the second precinct. The temple is one of few places where there is a separate shrine for Brahma.

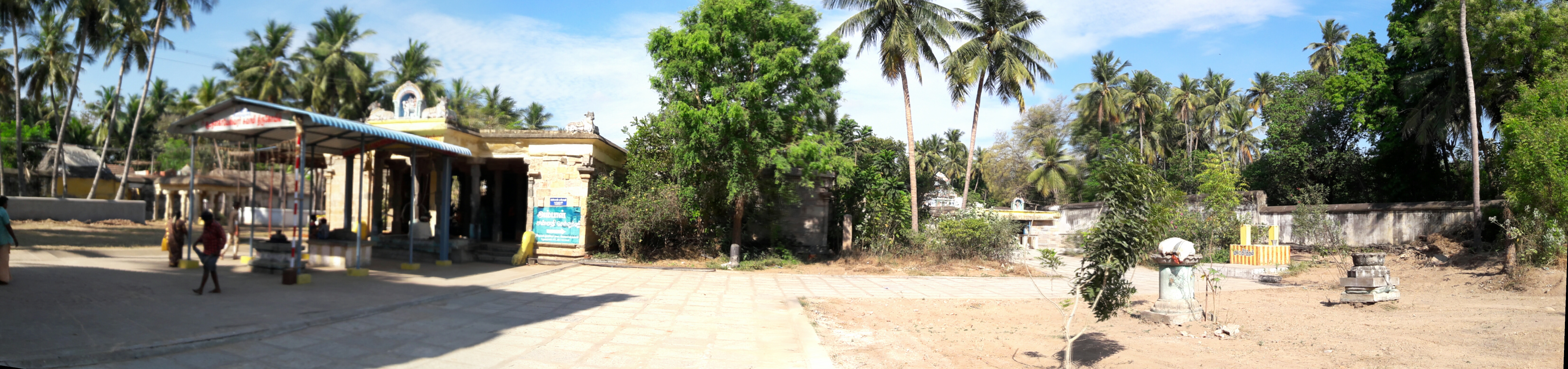
Panoramic view of the temple

== Saptha Stanam ==
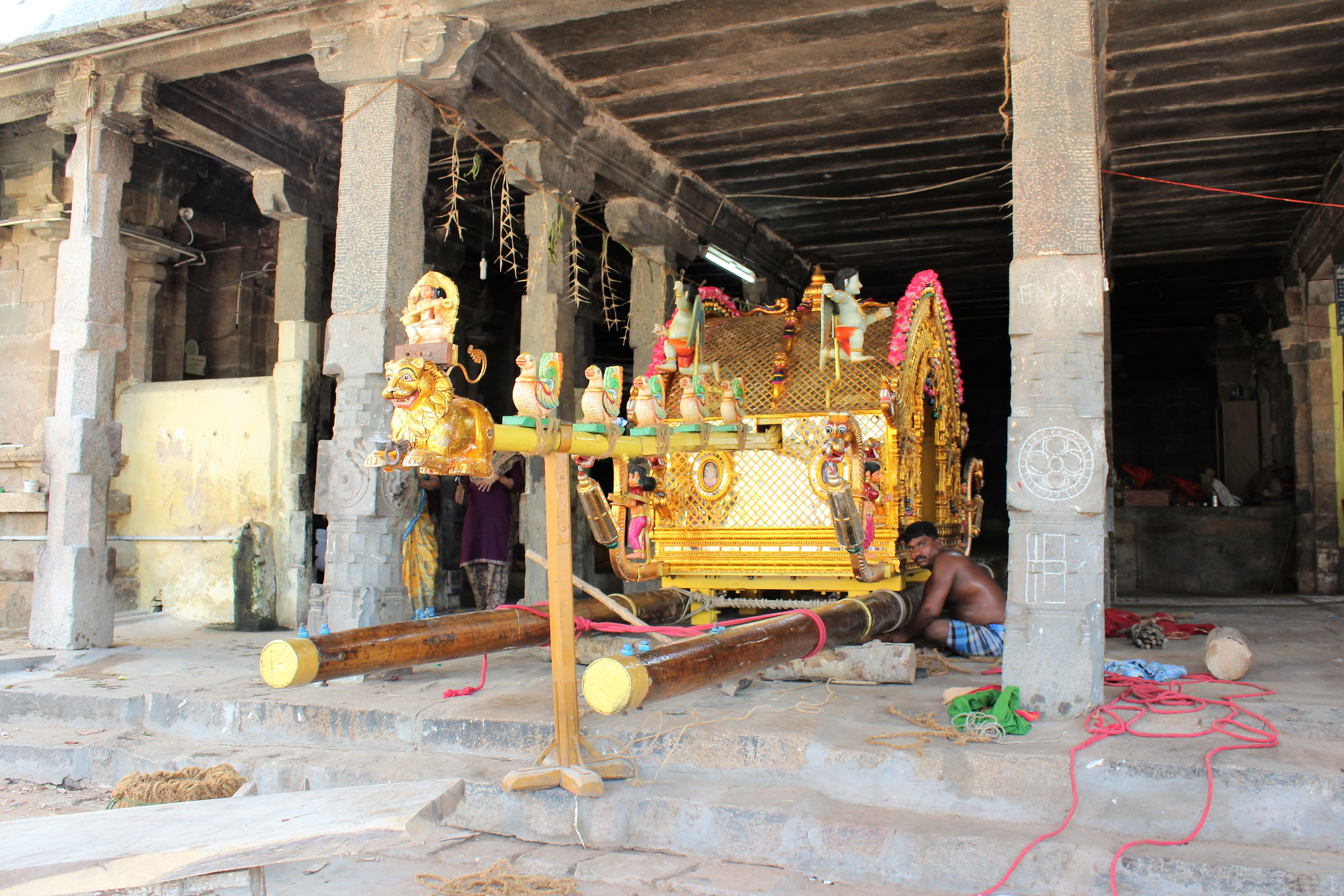
The decorated palanquin used during the festival

Om symbol Sapthastanam Om symbol
The seven important temples in and around Thiruvaiyaru
Temple	Location
Aiyarappar temple	Thiruvaiyaru
Apathsahayar Temple	Thirupazhanam
Odhanavaneswarar Temple	Tiruchotruturai
Vedapuriswarar Temple	Thiruvedhikudi
Kandeeswarar Temple	Thirukkandiyur
Puvananathar Temple	Thirupanturuthi
Neyyadiappar Temple	Tillaistanam

The sapthasthanam festival is conducted at Tiruvaiyaru during April every year. As per Hindu legend, it is the wedding festival of Nandikeswara, the sacred bull of Shiva on the Punarpoosa star during the Tamil month of Panguni. The festival deity of Aiyarappar temple of Thiruvaiyaru is carried in a decorated glass palanquin along with the images of Nandikeswara and Suyasayambikai to the temples in Thirupazhanam, Thiruchottruthurai, Thiruvedhikudi, Thirukandiyur and Thirupoonthurthi. Each of the festival deities of the respective temples mounted in glass palanquins accompany Aiyarppar on the way to the final destiny, Thillaistanam. There is a grand display of fireworks in the Cauvery riverbed outside Thillaistanam temple. The seven palanquins are carried to the Aiyarappar temple in Thiruvaiyyaru. Hundreds of people witness the convergence of seven glass palanquins carrying principal deities of respective temples from seven places at Tiruvaiyaru. The devotees perform Poochorithal(flower festival) in which a doll offers flowers to the principal deities in the palanquins. After the Poochorithal, the palanquins leave for their respective temples.
