= Pushpavananathar Temple, Tiruppoonturutti =

Shiva temple in Thanjavur district, Tamil Nadu, India

Pushpavananathar Temple
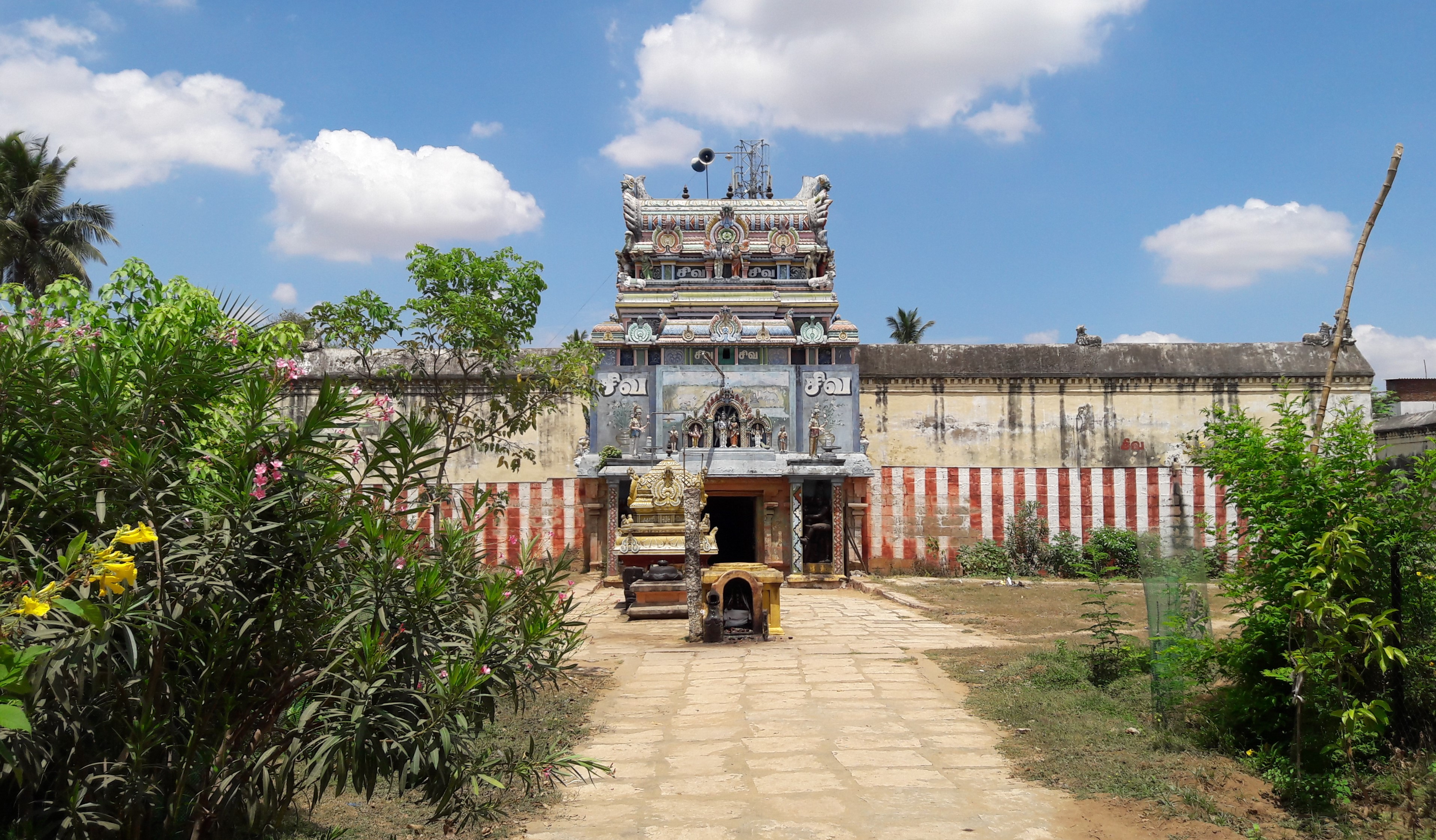

- Location in Tamil Nadu

Religion
- Affiliation: Hinduism
- District: Thanjavur
- Deity: Pushpavananathar (Shiva)

Location
- Location: Tiruppoonturutti
- State: Tamil Nadu
- Country: India
- Coordinates: 10°51′38″N 79°4′46″E

Architecture
- Type: Dravidian architecture

Pushpavananathar Temple is a Hindu temple dedicated to Shiva located in the village of Tiruppoonturutti near Tiruvaiyaru, Tamil Nadu, India. Shiva is worshiped as Aiyarappar, and is represented by the lingam and his consort Parvati is depicted as Soundaranayagi. The presiding deity is revered in the 7th-century-CE Tamil Saiva canonical work, the Tevaram, written by Tamil poet saints known as the nayanars and classified as Paadal Petra Sthalam.

== Legend ==
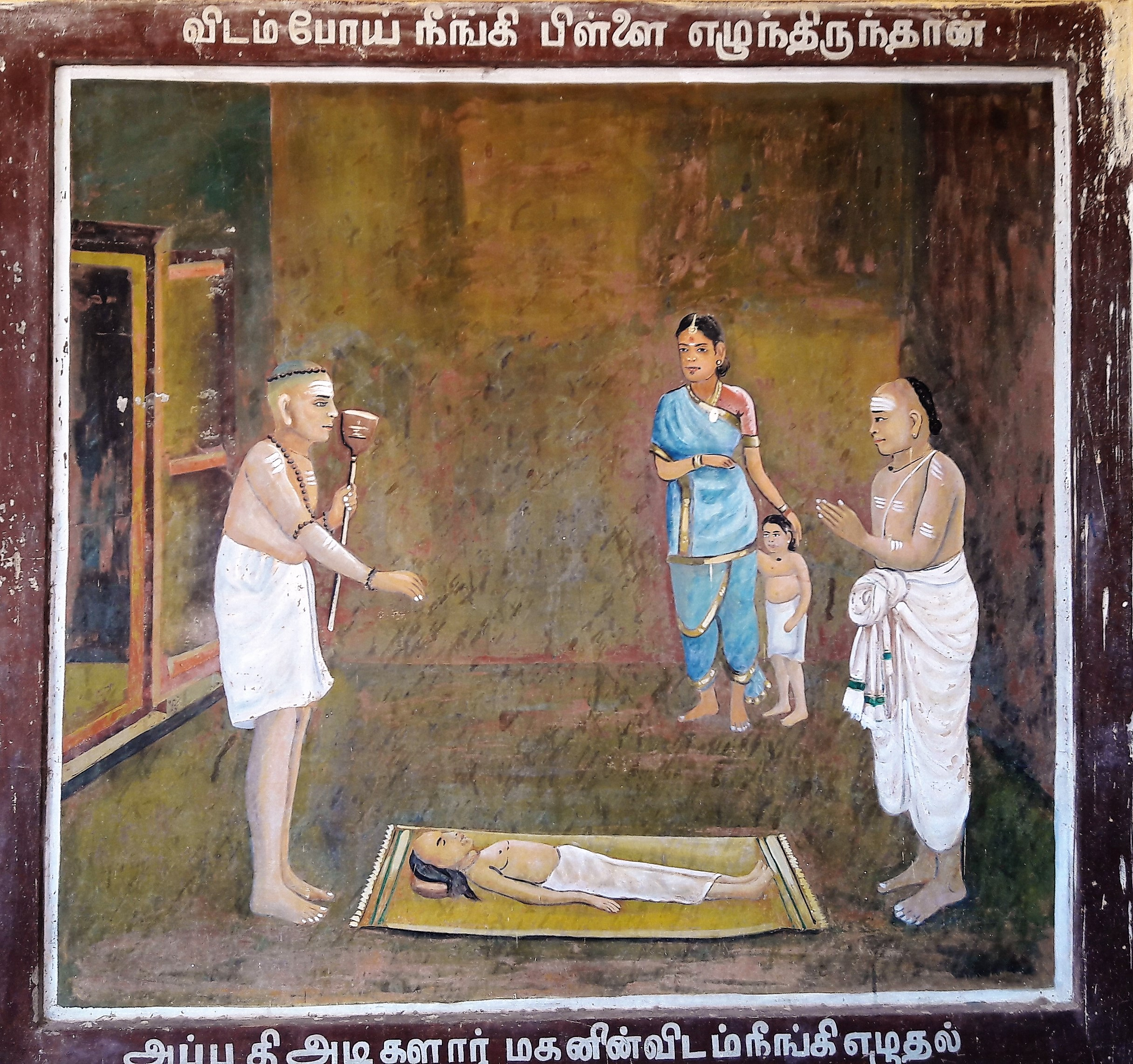
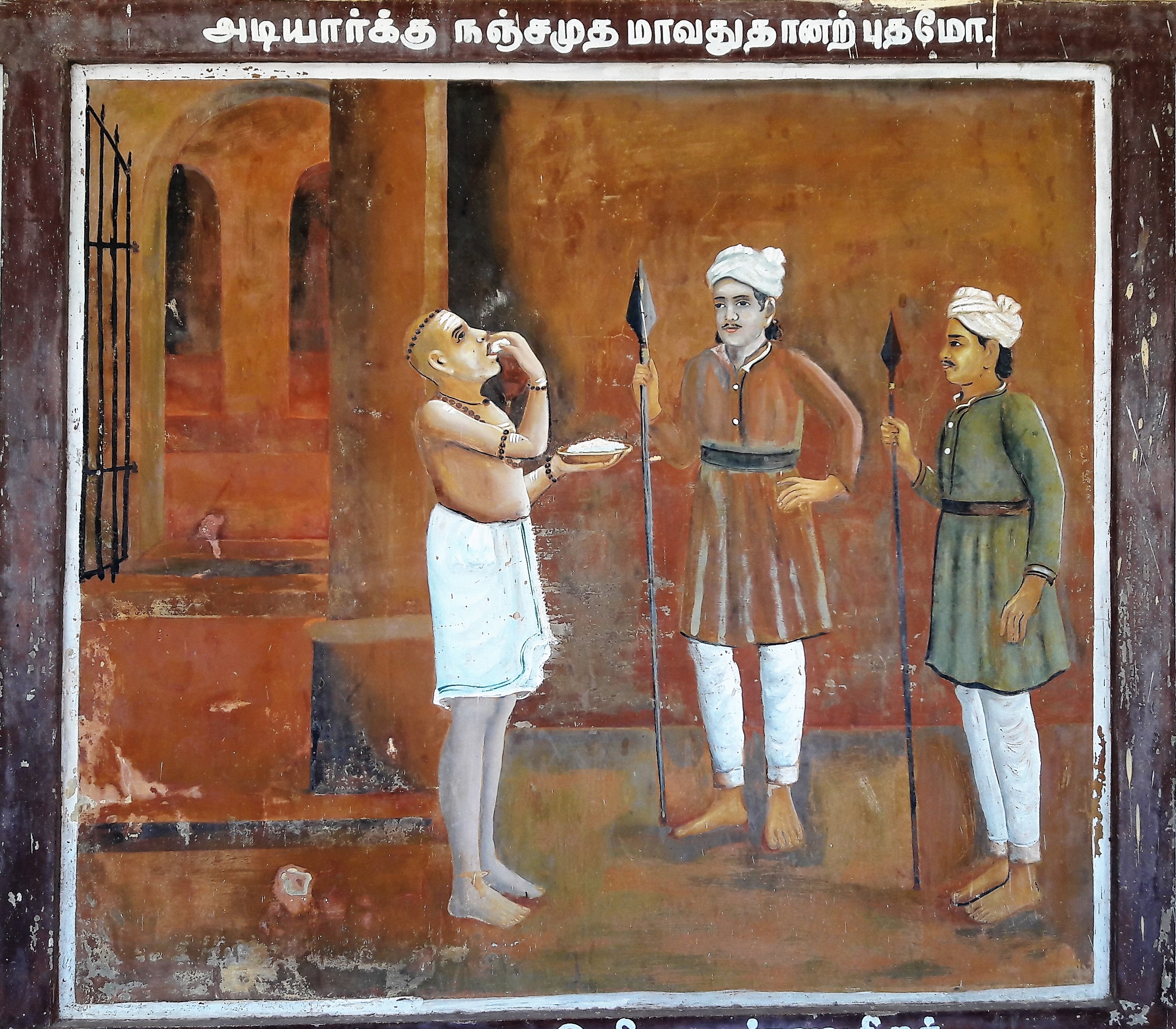
Sculptures in the temple

The temple is believed to be the place where Thirunavukkarasar (also called Appar), the Saivite saint from the 7th century is believed to have performed extensive weeding work in the temple. The temple is also the place where the other Saivite saint Sambandar is believed to have stopped at the entrance and the Nandi moved a little to allow him the view of the sanctum. The place is also believed to be the place where Appar shouldered the palanquin of Sambandar. As per Hindu legend, Indra was cursed by sage Gautama to have thousand moles in his body to make him ugly for his bad desires. Indra was passing through many places for relief, but when he reached the place, he started performing worship with flowers (called poo in Tamil). The presiding deity thus came to be known as Pushpavananthar. As per the regional view, a holy place lying between two rivers is called Thurthi. It is one such place, with the other Thuruthi located near Mayiladuthurai.

== Architecture ==
The temple is located 5 km south-west of Tiruvaiyaru on the Thanjavur Tiruvayyaru road. The temple has a five-tiered rajagopuram the gateway tower. The Panchamurthi mandapa is found in the first precinct and the Vasantha Mandapa is found in the second entrance. The first precinct has paintings of the life of sage Appar. There are various unique sculptures in the temple like Appar in seated posture, Panruti Katava Nambi and Durga standing in one leg to atone the killing of Mahishasura. The temple occupies an area of around 2.5 acres (1.0 ha). The central shrine houses the image of Pushpavananthar in the form of Lingam facing east. Unlike other temples, where the Nandi is located axial to and facing the sanctum, in this temple the Nandi is located slightly out of axis. The central shrine is approached through the flagstaff and Mahamandapam, both which are located axial to the gateway. The shrine of Valambigai, the consort of Shiva facing West is located in the Mahamandapam leading to the sanctum. As in other Shiva temples in Tamil Nadu, the shrines of Vinayaka, Murugan, Navagraha, Chandikesa and Durga are located around the precinct of the main shrine. There is a hall of Nataraja near the sanctum. In modern times, the temple is maintained and administered by the Hindu Religious and Charitable Endowments Department of the Government of Tamil Nadu.

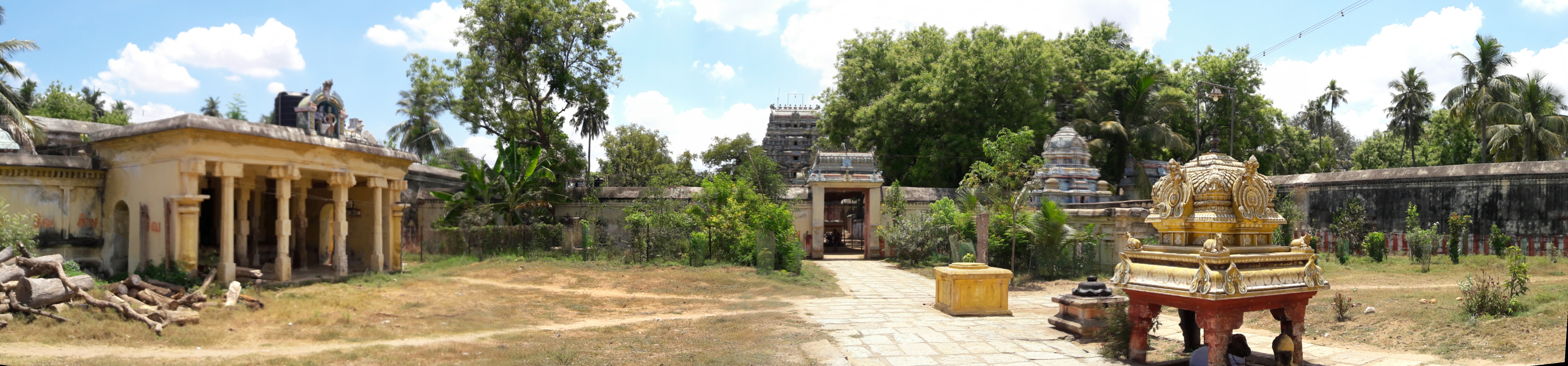
Panorama of the temple

== Saptha Stanam ==
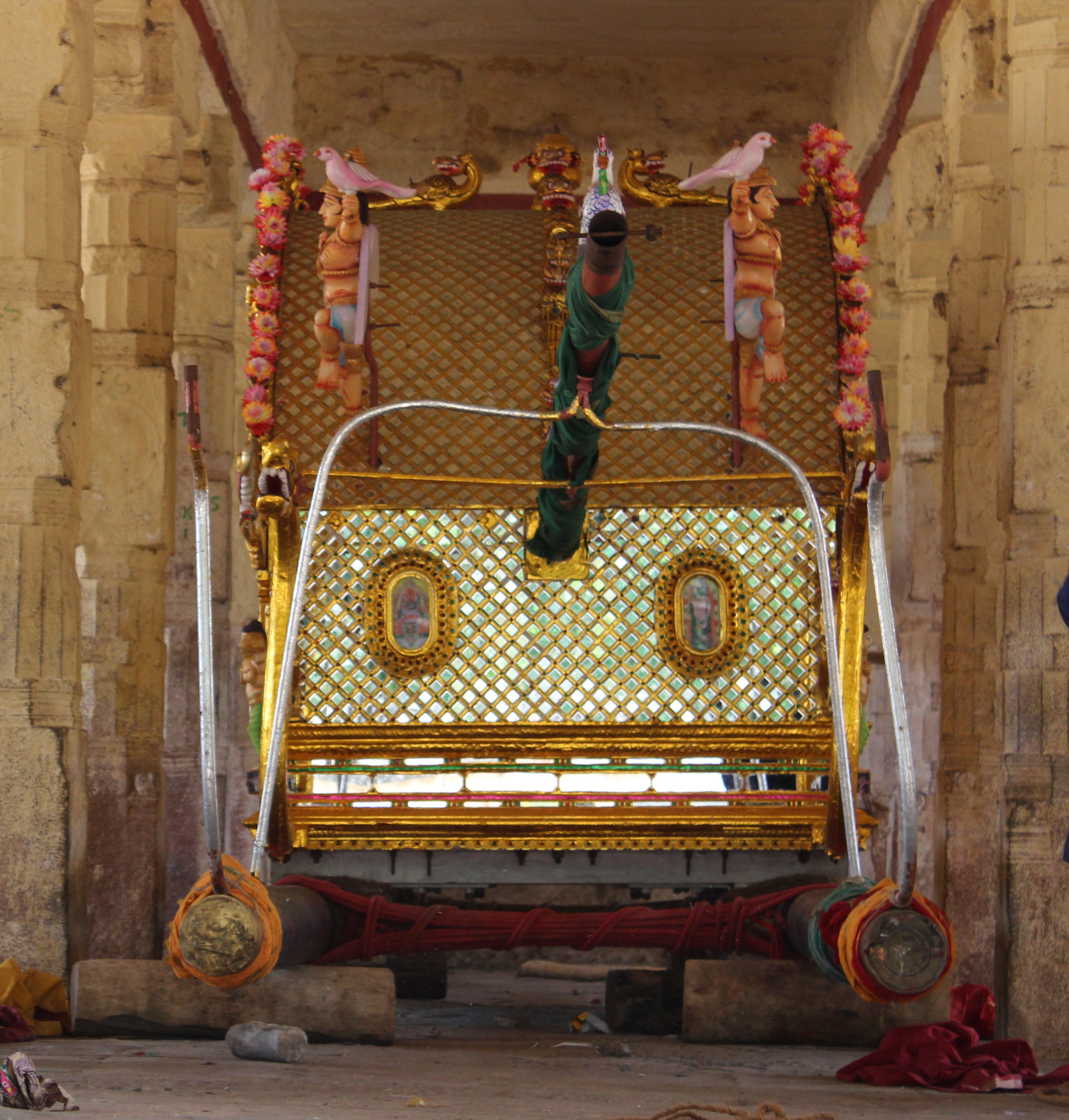
The decorated palanquin used during the festival

Om symbol Sapthastanam Om symbol
The seven important temples in and around Thiruvaiyaru
Temple	Location
Aiyarappar temple	Thiruvaiyaru
Apathsahayar Temple	Thirupazhanam
Odhanavaneswarar Temple	Tiruchotruturai
Vedapuriswarar Temple	Thiruvedhikudi
Kandeeswarar Temple	Thirukkandiyur
Puvananathar Temple	Thirupanturuthi
Neyyadiappar Temple	Tillaistanam

The sapthasthanam festival is conducted at Tiruvaiyaru during April every year. As per Hindu legend, it is the wedding festival of Nandikeswara, the sacred bull of Shiva on the Punarpoosa star during the Tamil month of Panguni. The festival deity of Aiyarappar temple of Thiruvaiyaru is carried in a decorated glass palanquin along with the images of Nandikeswara and Suyasayambikai to the temples in Thirupazhanam, Thiruchottruthurai, Thiruvedhikudi, Thirukandiyur and Thirupoonthurthi. Each of the festival deities of the respective temples mounted in glass palanquins accompany Aiyarppar on the way to the final destiny, Thillaistanam. There is a grand display of fireworks in Cauvery riverbed outside Thillaistanam temple. The seven palanquins are carried to Aiyarappar temple in Thiruvaiyyaru. Hundreds of people witness the convergence of seven glass palanquins carrying principal deities of respective temples from seven places at Tiruvaiyaru. The devotees perform Poochorithal (flower festival) in which a doll offers flowers to the principal deities in the palanquins. After the Poochorithal, the palanquins leave for their respective temples.

== Religious imporanct and worship practices ==
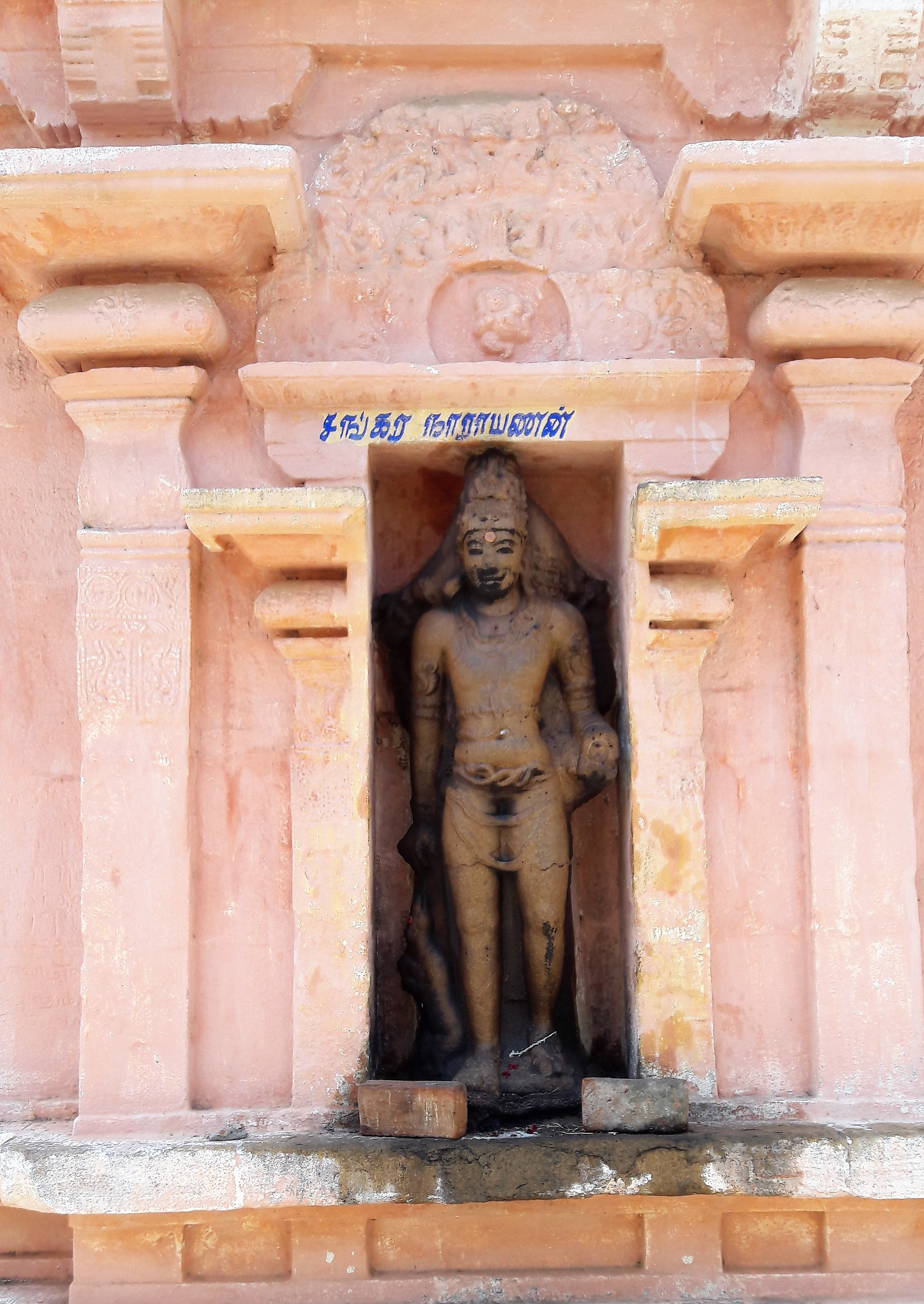
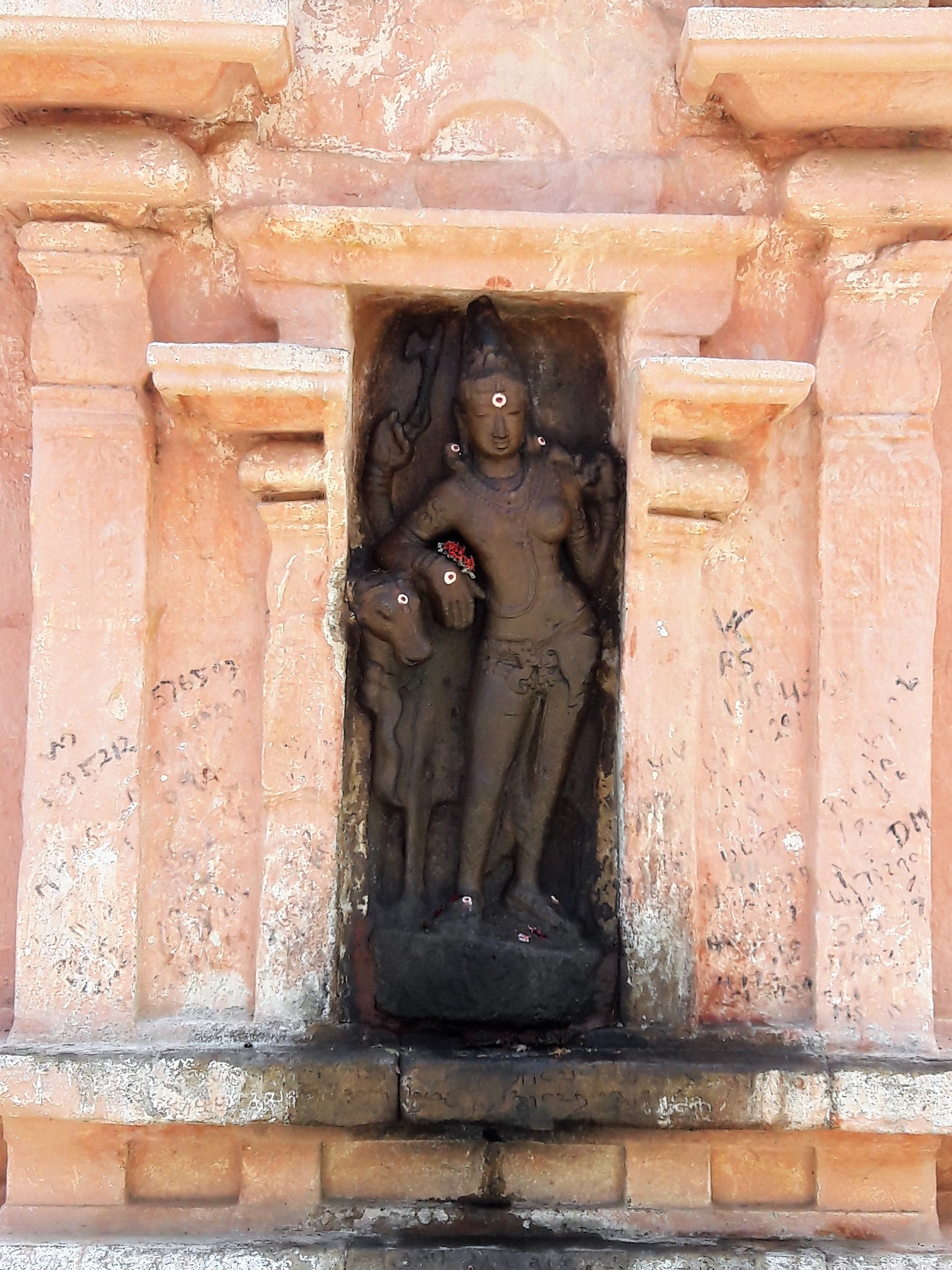
Sculptures on the walls of the temple

The temple is one of the shrines of the 275 Paadal Petra Sthalams – Shiva Sthalams glorified in the early medieval Tevaram poems by Tamil Saivite Nayanars Sundarar. The temple houses the samadhi of Sanakar, the disciple of Dakshinamoorthy in front of the image of Shiva. The temple is also the place where Sivananda Mouna Guru Swamigal was doing penance. As the temple is revered in Tevaram, it is classified as Paadal Petra Sthalam, one of the 275 temples that find mention in the Saiva canon. The temple is counted as the 242nd in the list of 276 temples. The temple is counted as one of the temples built on the banks of River Kaveri. Narayana Teertha (c. 1650 – 1745 CE) has composed many songs on the presiding deity.
