= Kandeeswarar Temple, Kandiyur =

Shiva temple in Thanjavur district, Tamil Nadu, India

Thirukandiyur
- Brahma Sira Kandeeswarar Temple
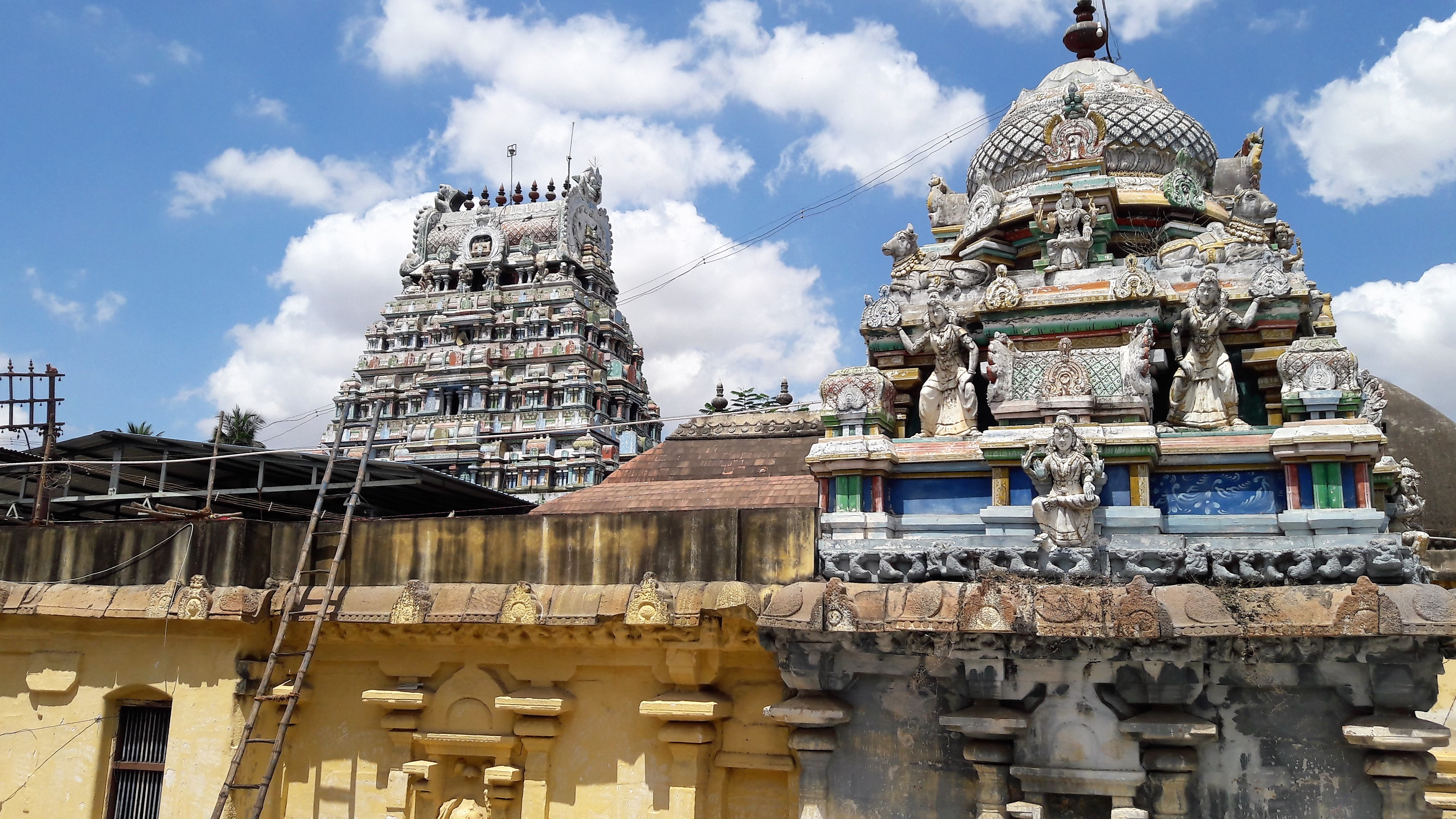

- Location in Tamil Nadu

Religion
- Affiliation: Hinduism
- District: Thanjavur
- Deity: Brahma Sira Kandeeswarar (Shiva)

Location
- Location: Kandiyur
- State: Tamil Nadu
- Country: India
- Coordinates: 10°51′36″N 79°6′30″E

Architecture
- Type: Dravidian architecture

Kandeeswarar Temple (also called Brahmakandeeswarar temple, Brahmasirakandeeswarar temple and Veerataneeswarar temple) is a Hindu temple dedicated to the god Shiva located in Kandiyur also known as Thirukkandiyur or Tirukkandiyur, near Tiruvaiyaru, Tamil Nadu, India. Shiva is worshiped as Kandeeswarar, and is represented by the lingam and his consort Parvati is depicted as Mangalanayagi. The presiding deity is revered in the 7th-century-CE Tamil Saiva canonical work, the Tevaram, written by Tamil poet saints known as the nayanars and classified as Paadal Petra Sthalam. As per legends, Shiva is believed to have destroyed eight different demons and the eight Ashta Veeratanam temples are built signifying each of his victories in the war. The temple is one of the eight where Shiva is believed to have removed one of the five heads of Brahma.

There are many inscriptions associated with the temple indicating contributions from: Cholas, Thanjavur Nayaks and Thanjavur Maratha kingdom. The temple has numerous shrines. The shrines of Kandeeswarar and Mangalanayagi are the most prominent. The temple-complex houses many halls and three precincts. The temple has six daily rituals at various times from 6:30 a.m. to 8:30 p.m., and many yearly festivals on its calendar. The temple is one of the Sapthastanams of Aiyarappar temple and the Sapthastanam festival celebrated during the month of January is the most prominent festival in the temple, and the region. The temple is maintained and administered by Hindu Religious and Charitable Endowments Department of the Government of Tamil Nadu. Many temples have same name, Kandeshwarar Temple is also in Thamarankottai, a village in Pattukottai taluk of Thanjavur district.

== Legend ==
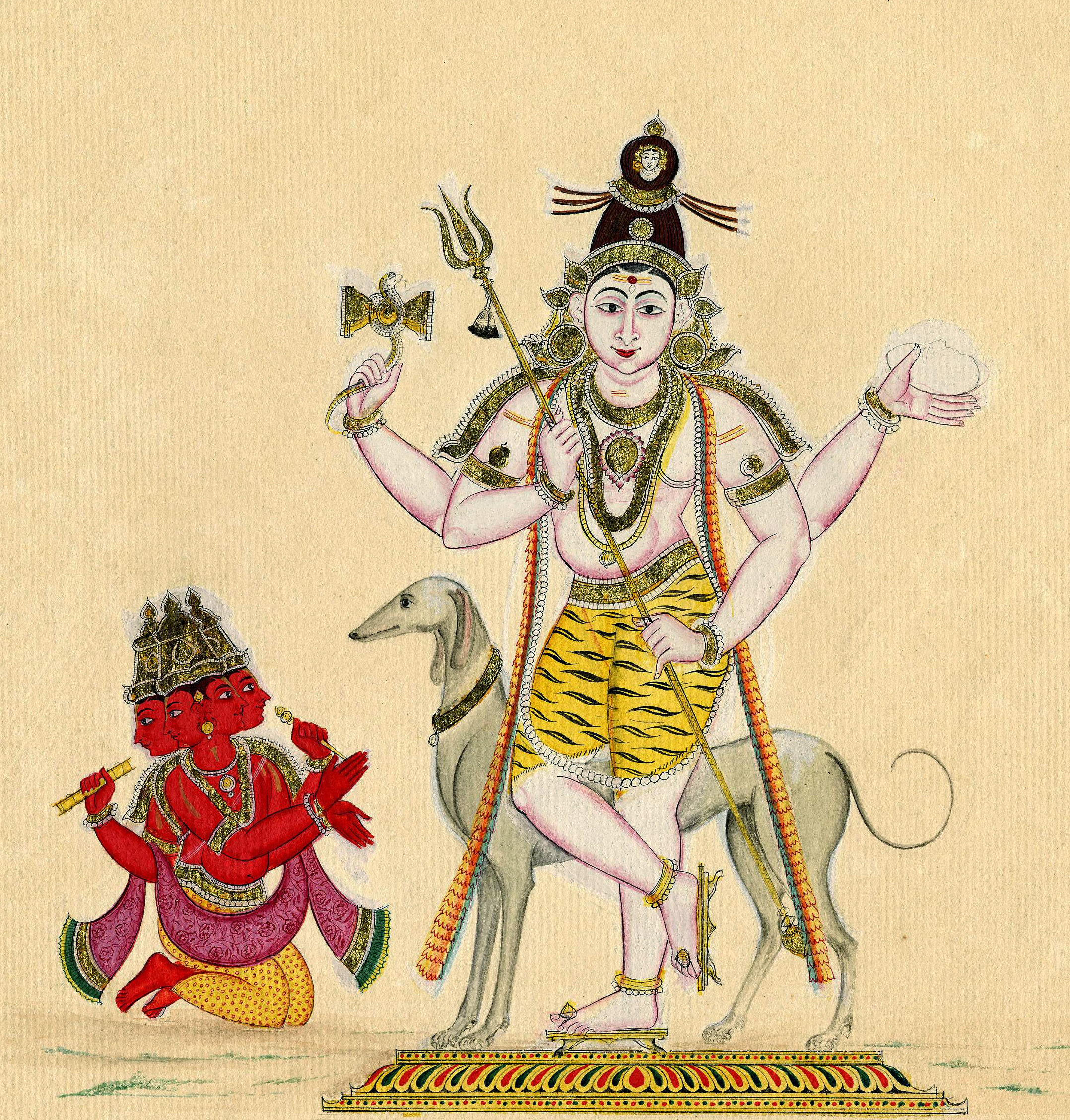
Brahma praying to Shiva

As per Hindu legend, Brahma, the Hindu god of creation and Shiva, the Hindu god of destruction, had originally five heads. Parvati, the wife of Shiva, once got confused and performed patha pooja (ablution of feet, considered an act of respect) to Brahma, instead of Shiva. Shiva got enraged and cut off one of Brahma's heads; the cut head got stuck in his hand due to Brahma's curse. To get rid off the sin, Shiva worshipped Vishnu at Thirukarambanur as Bhikshatana, where a part of his sin was relieved. He got his curse fully relieved after visiting Vishnu at Thirukandiyur and taking a holy dip in the temple tank, Kamala Pushkarani. Since Vishnu relieved (vimochana) the sin (saabha) of Shiva (also called Hara), the temple is called Hara Sabha Vimochana temple. After the incident, the tank came to be known as Kapala Theertham (kapala indicates skull). Shiva was pleased and he built the Hara Sabha Vimochana temple and also built a temple for himself near it.

As per another legend, Lakshmi, the consort of Vishnu requested Shiva to cut off one of the heads of Brahma as she felt that Vishnu would ignore her and show all his affection towards Brahma. Sage Bhrigu, King Mahabali and Chandra (Moon) all got their sins relieved worshipping Vishnu here in the temple. Sage Bhrigu, once wanted to test the superior of Vishnu, Brahma and Shiva. He kicked Vishnu in his chest in anger and got relieved of the sin here. Chandra, who sinned by seducing the preceptor's wife, got partially relieved of it by worshipping Hara Saabha Vimochana Perumal.

== Architecture ==
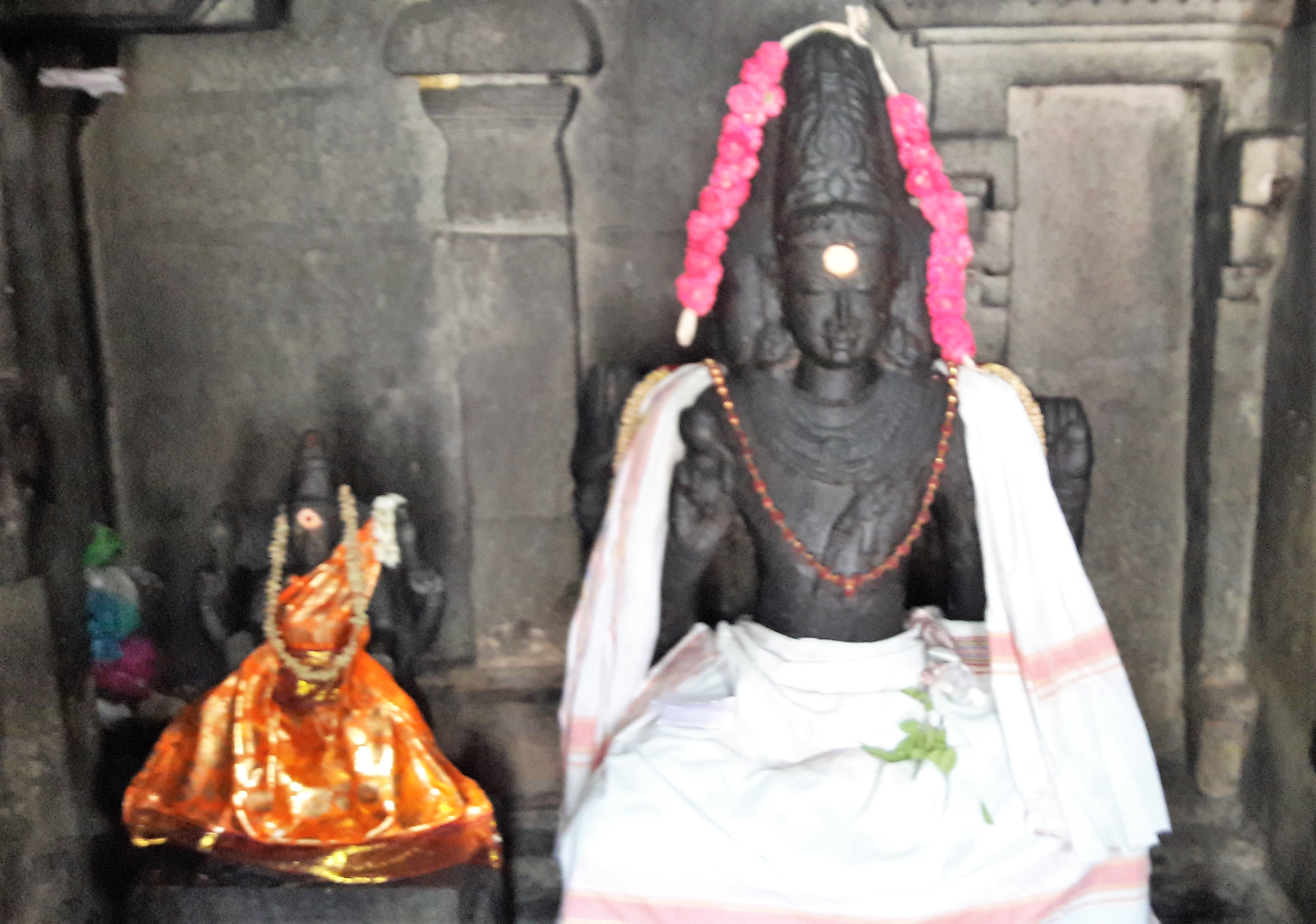
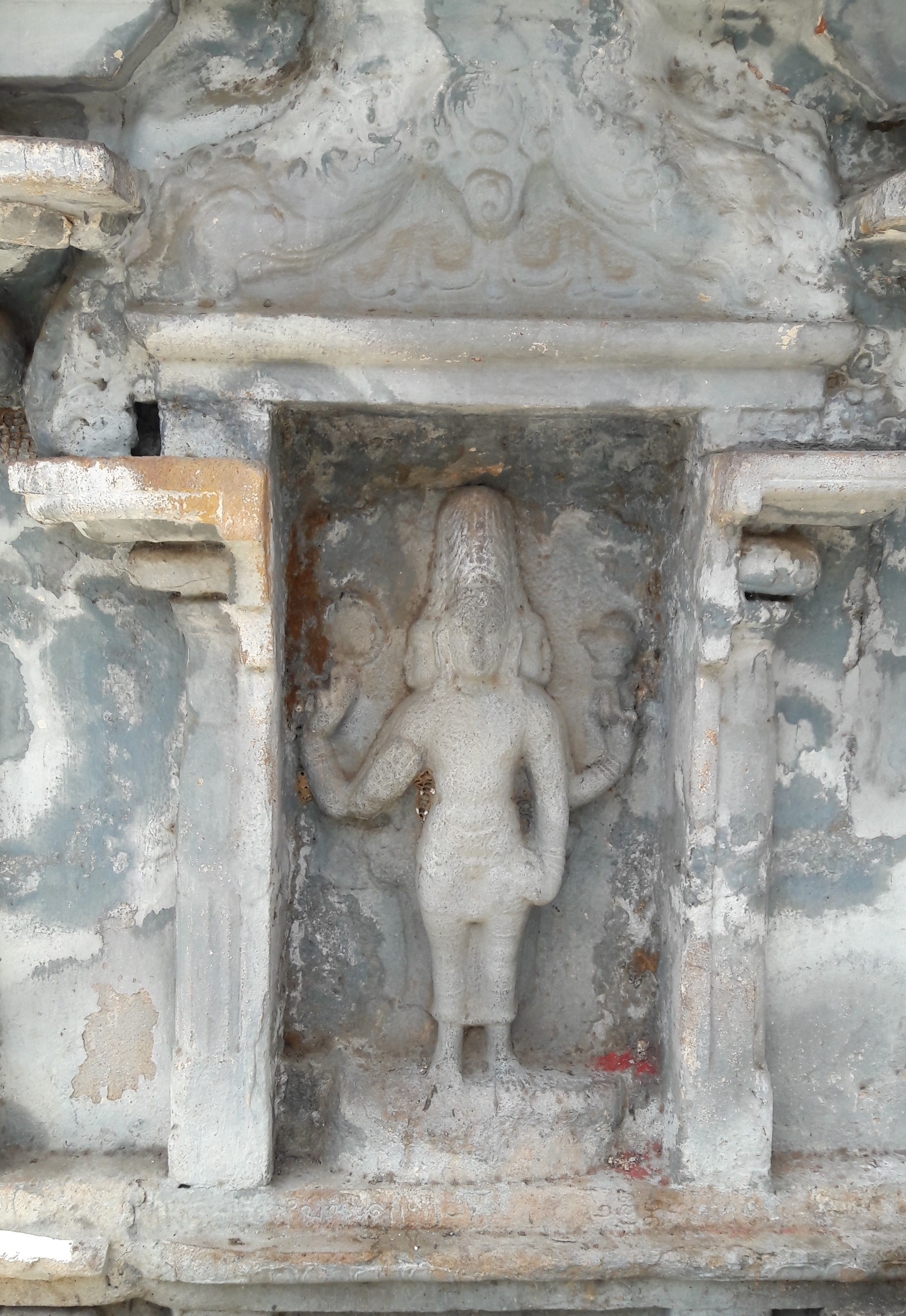
Images of Shiva and Brahma on the walls around the sanctum

The temple is located 21 km away from Kumbakonam on the Kumbakonam- Tiruvaiyaru- Tanjore road. The temple is 2 km away from Tiruvaiyaru and located in the heart of Thirukandiyur. Kandeeswarar has a five-tiered rajagopuram and a west-facing sanctum. The sanctum lies axil to the temple gateway and the flag staff, which is located after the gopuram in the second precinct. The shrine of Ambal (Parvati) is south facing and she is sported in standing posture. There are shrines of Vinayagar (Ganesha), Murugan (Kartikeya) with Valli & Deivanai, Mahalakshmi and Vishnu Durga. The images of Brahma, Lingodbhava and Dakshinamurthy are located in the planks around the sanctum. The sanctum is guarded by Dvarapalas and the image of sage Sathapatha is depicted in the nearby wall. In the halls in the first precinct, there are images of Sapthastana lingas and Panchabhoota lingas. There are small images of Brahma and Saraswathi near the sanctum. The temple is one of few places where there is a separate shrine for Brahma.

== Religious significance ==
The temple is counted as one of the temples built on the banks of River Kaveri. This temple is one of the 7 shrines associated with Saptamartrikas (seven female deities in Siva temple). The temple is one of the Ashta Veeratanam temples that commemorate Shiva's eight acts of valour and fury where he became victorious over demons, heroes or divinities. and also as places where he is believed to have performed with fury.

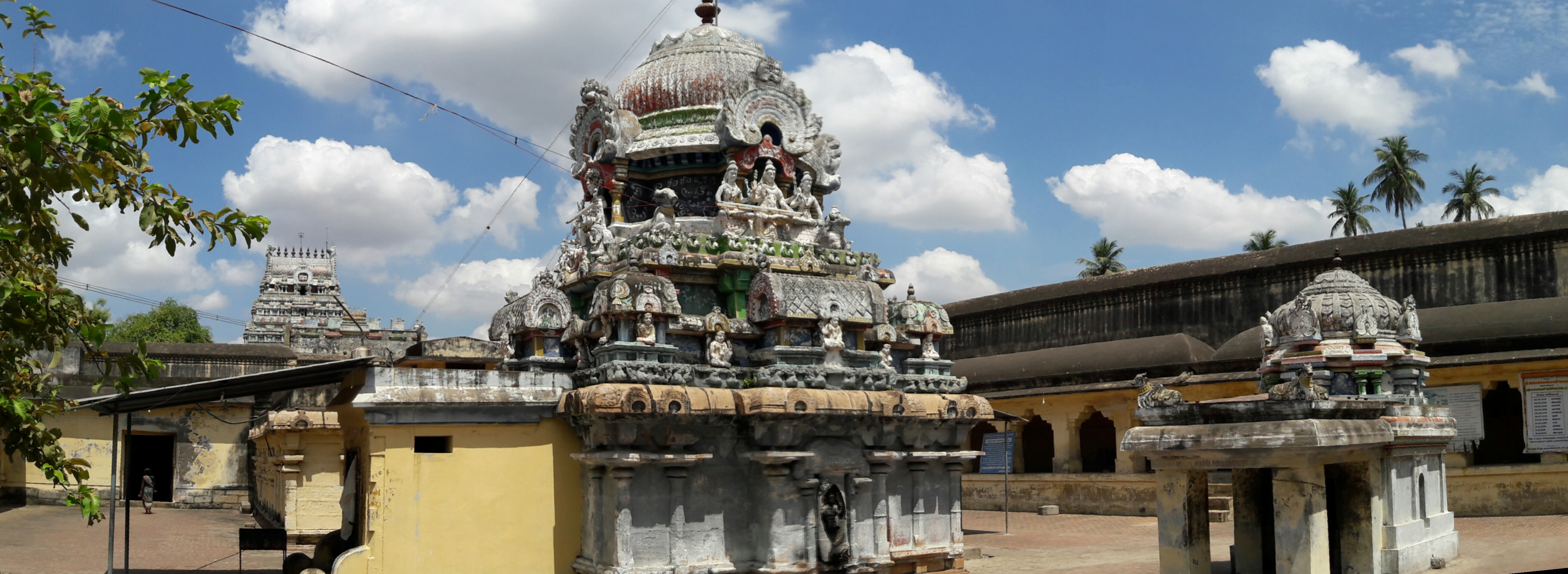
Panorma of the temple

== Saptha Stanam ==
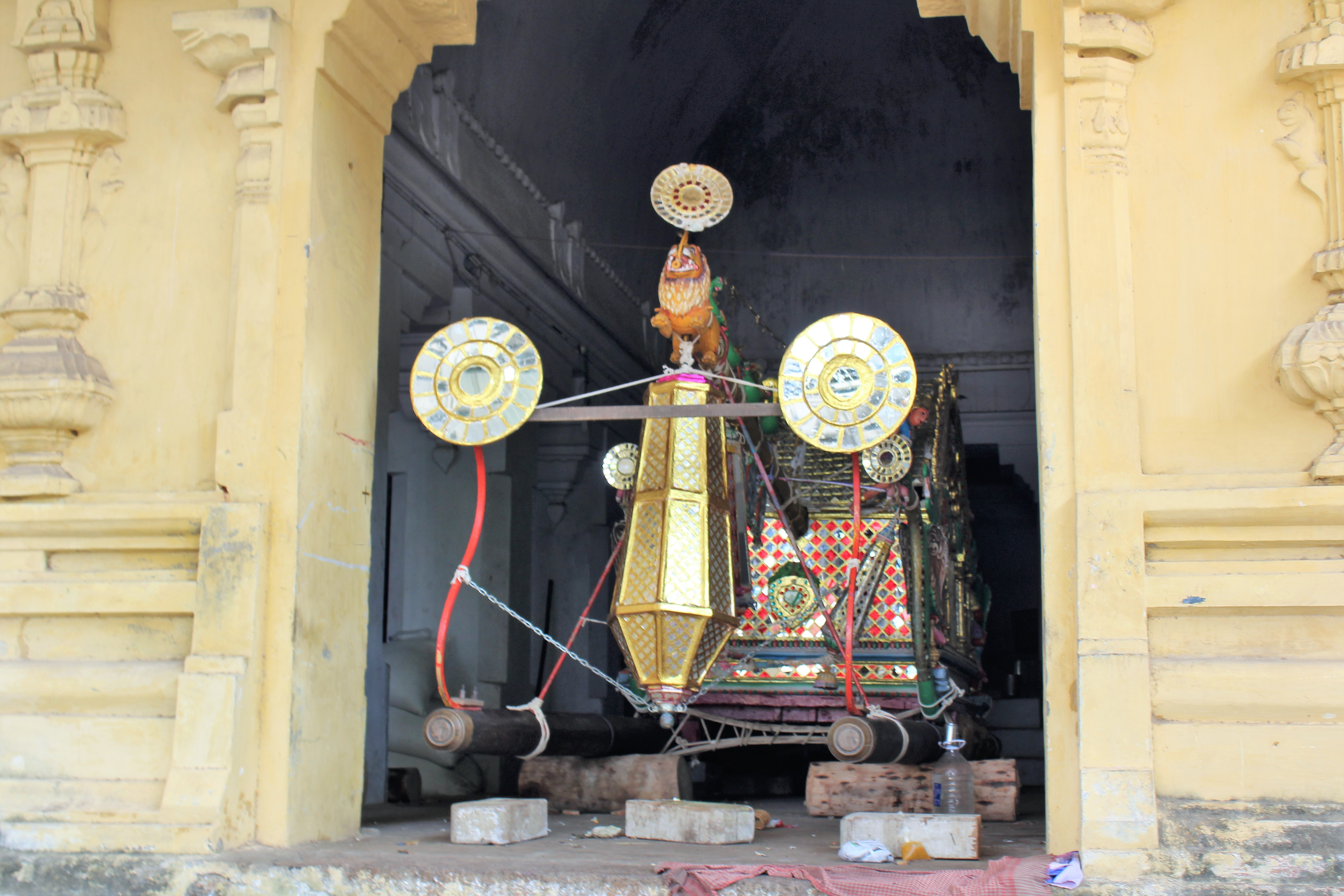
The decorated palanquin used during the festival

Om symbol Sapthastanam Om symbol
The seven important temples in and around Thiruvaiyaru
Temple	Location
Aiyarappar temple	Thiruvaiyaru
Apathsahayar Temple	Thirupazhanam
Odhanavaneswarar Temple	Tiruchotruturai
Vedapuriswarar Temple	Thiruvedhikudi
Kandeeswarar Temple	Thirukkandiyur
Puvananathar Temple	Thirupanturuthi
Neyyadiappar Temple	Tillaistanam

The sapthasthanam festival is conducted at Tiruvaiyaru during April every year. As per Hindu legend, it is the wedding festival of Nandikeswara, the sacred bull of Shiva on the Punarpoosa Star during the Tamil month of Panguni. The festival deity of Aiyarappar temple of Thiruvaiyaru is carried in a decorated glass palanquin along with the images of Nandikeswara and Suyasayambikai to the temples in Thirupazhanam, Thiruchottruthurai, Thiruvedhikudi, Thirukandiyur and Thirupoonthurthi. Each of the festival deities of the respective temples mounted in glass-palanquins, accompany Aiyarppar on the way to the "final destiny", Thillaistanam. There is a grand display of fireworks in the Cauvery Riverbed outside Thillaistanam Temple. The seven palanquins are carried to the Aiyarappar Temple in Thiruvaiyyaru. Hundreds of people witness the convergence of seven glass-palanquins carrying principal deities of respective temples from seven places at Tiruvaiyaru. The devotees perform Poochorithal (flower festival) in which a doll offers flowers to the principal deities in the palanquins. After the Poochorithal, the palanquins leave for their respective temples.

== Worship and festivals ==
The temple priests perform the pooja (rituals) during festivals and on a daily basis. Like other Shiva temples of Tamil Nadu, the priests belong to the Shaivaite community, a Brahmin sub-caste. The temple rituals are performed four times a day; Ushathkalam at Kalasanthi at 8:00 a.m., Uchikalam at 10:00 a.m., Sayarakshai at 6:00 p.m., and Ardha Jamam at 8:30 p.m. Each ritual comprises four steps: abhisheka (sacred bath), alangaram (decoration), neivethanam (food offering) and deepa aradanai (waving of lamps) for both Kandeeswarar and Mangalanayagi. The worship is held amidst music with nagaswaram (pipe instrument) and tavil (percussion instrument), religious instructions in the Vedas read by priests and prostration by worshippers in front of the temple mast. There are weekly rituals like somavaram and sukravaram, fortnightly rituals like pradosham and monthly festivals like amavasai (new moon day), kiruthigai, pournami (full moon day) and sathurthi. While Sapthastanam is the major festival in the temple, Shivratri celebrated during the Tamil month of Masi (February - March) and Thiruvadhirai during the Tamil month of Margazhi (December - January) are the other festivals in the temple.

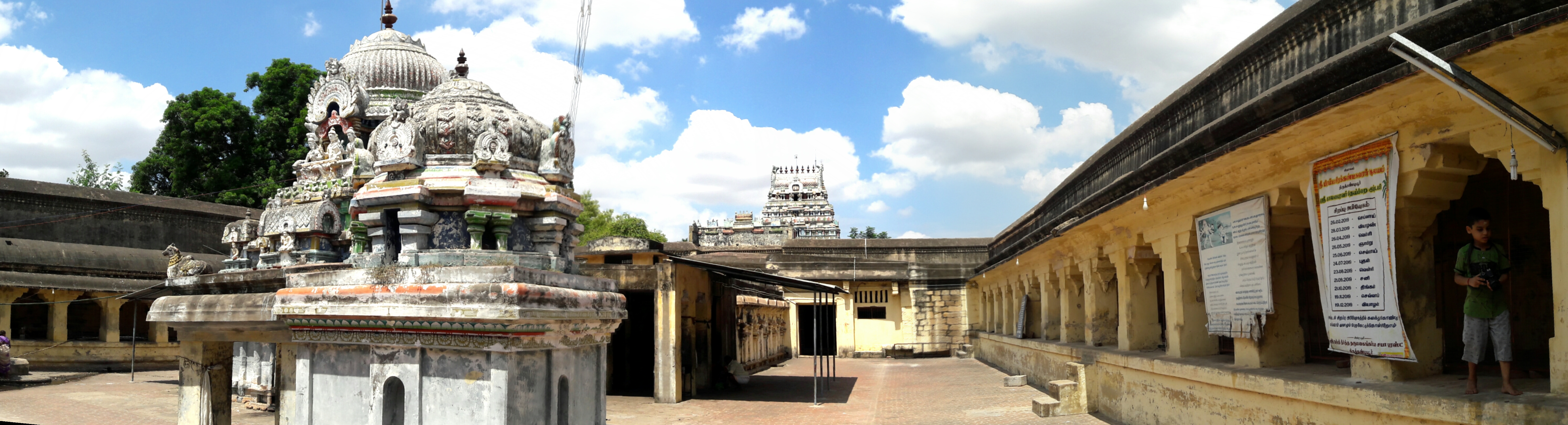
Panoramic view of the temple
