= Odhanavaneswarar Temple, Tiruchotruturai =

Shiva temple in Thanjavur district, Tamil Nadu, India

Odhanavaneswarar Temple
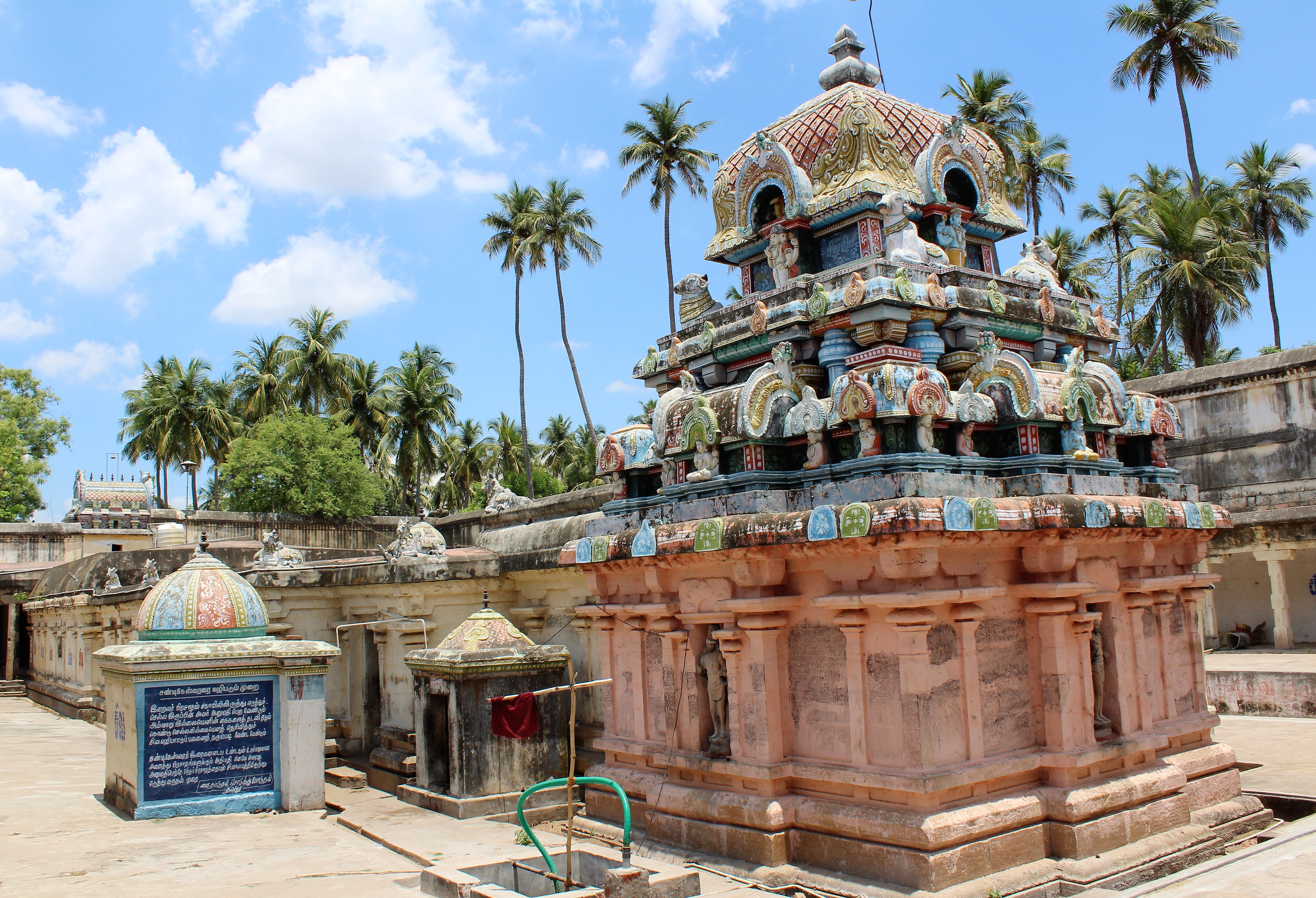
- Odhanavaneswarar Temple vimana

- Location in Tamil Nadu

Religion
- Affiliation: Hinduism
- District: Thanjavur
- Deity: Odhanavaneswarar (Shiva) Annapoorani (Parvati)

Location
- Location: Tiruchotruturai
- State: Tamil Nadu
- Country: India
- Coordinates: 10°52′32″N 79°8′16″E

Architecture
- Type: Dravidian architecture

Odhanavaneswarar Temple, Tiruchotruturai (also called Oppillaselvar Temple) is a Hindu temple dedicated to Shiva located in the village of Tiruchotruthurai, Tamil Nadu, India. The Five Rivers are Vadavaru, Vennaaru, Vettaaru, Kudamuruttiyaaru and Kaaviriyaaru. Shiva is worshiped as Odhanavaneswarar, and is represented by the lingam and his consort Parvati is depicted as Annapoorani. The presiding deity is revered in the 7th century Tamil Saiva canonical work, the Tevaram, written by Tamil poet saints known as the nayanars and classified as Paadal Petra Sthalam.

This temple is known as Dakshina Kailasham (Kailash of the South). This is the place where Nandi (the divine bull of lord Shiva) was born and became the mount for Shiva. The divine wedding of Nandi and Suyasayambikai was held at Thirumazhapadi Vaidyanathaswamy temple in Ariyalur district of Tamil Nadu. This is celebrated as Saptha Stanam festival which includes seven Shiva temples of the region.

There are many inscriptions associated with the temple indicating contributions from Cholas, Pandyas, Thanjavur Nayaks and Thanjavur Maratha kingdom. The oldest parts of the present masonry structure were built during the Chola dynasty in the 9th century, while later expansions, are attributed to later periods, up to the Thanjavur Nayaks during the 16th century.

The temple complex is one of the largest in the state and it houses four gateway towers known as gopurams.

== Legend ==
As per Hindu legend, Shiva was pleased by the devotion by one of his devotees named Arulalan and bestowed him with a vessel with never ending food giving capabilities. As per another legend, during one time, there was a never ending famine. Sage Gautama performed penance in the place, pleased by which Shiva gave a boon that the place would have never ending food supplied capabilities. The place where paddy grew is referred as arisi vilaintha vayal and the canal is referred as cottrudayan vaaykal. The place was thus referred as Thiruchotruthurai, meaning the banks of the canal where rice grew. Another variant of the legend indicates that Parvathi appeared as Annapoorani and fed his devotees in the place. The place where Ambal fed the devotees was called Annam Paintha Vayal (the field where food was produced). Following the legend, the devotees who participate in the Sapthastanam festival are fed in the temple.

== Architecture ==
The temple is located in Tiruchotruturai, a village in Thanjavur district in the Indian state of Tamil Nadu. It is situated on the banks of the river Kaveri, 10 km from Thanjavur, and 3 km from Thiruvaiyaru on the Thirukandiyur - Thanjavur road. The temple has three prakarams (closed precincts of a temple) and many mandapams (halls). The temple faces east and is entered via a three-tiered pyramidal rajagopuram (gateway tower). The presiding deity in the form of lingam is housed in the sanctum in square shape. The attached hall, the ardhamandapa measures the same width as the sanctum, while its length is twice the sanctum. The ardhamandapa projects towards the east. The Mukhamandapa has a square structure. There are five devakoshtas that cover the exterior walls of the sanctum. The images of Dakshinamurthy and Brahma are the only ones remaining out of the five. There are two large Dvarapala, guardian deities on either side of the entrance of the ardhamandapa. There are images of Lingas replicating Sapthavidangam and Saptamatrika.

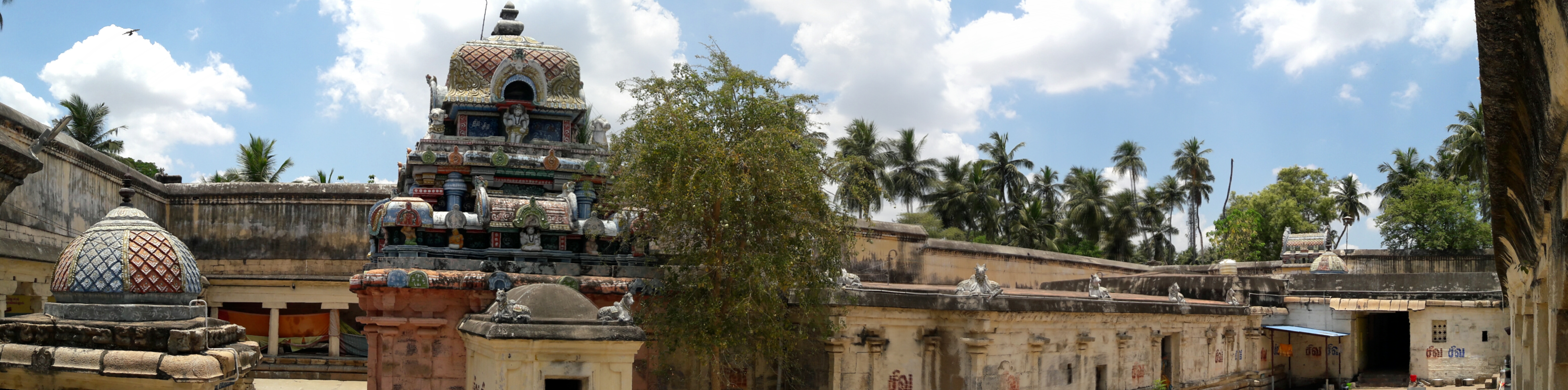
Shrines within the temple

== Saptha Stanam ==
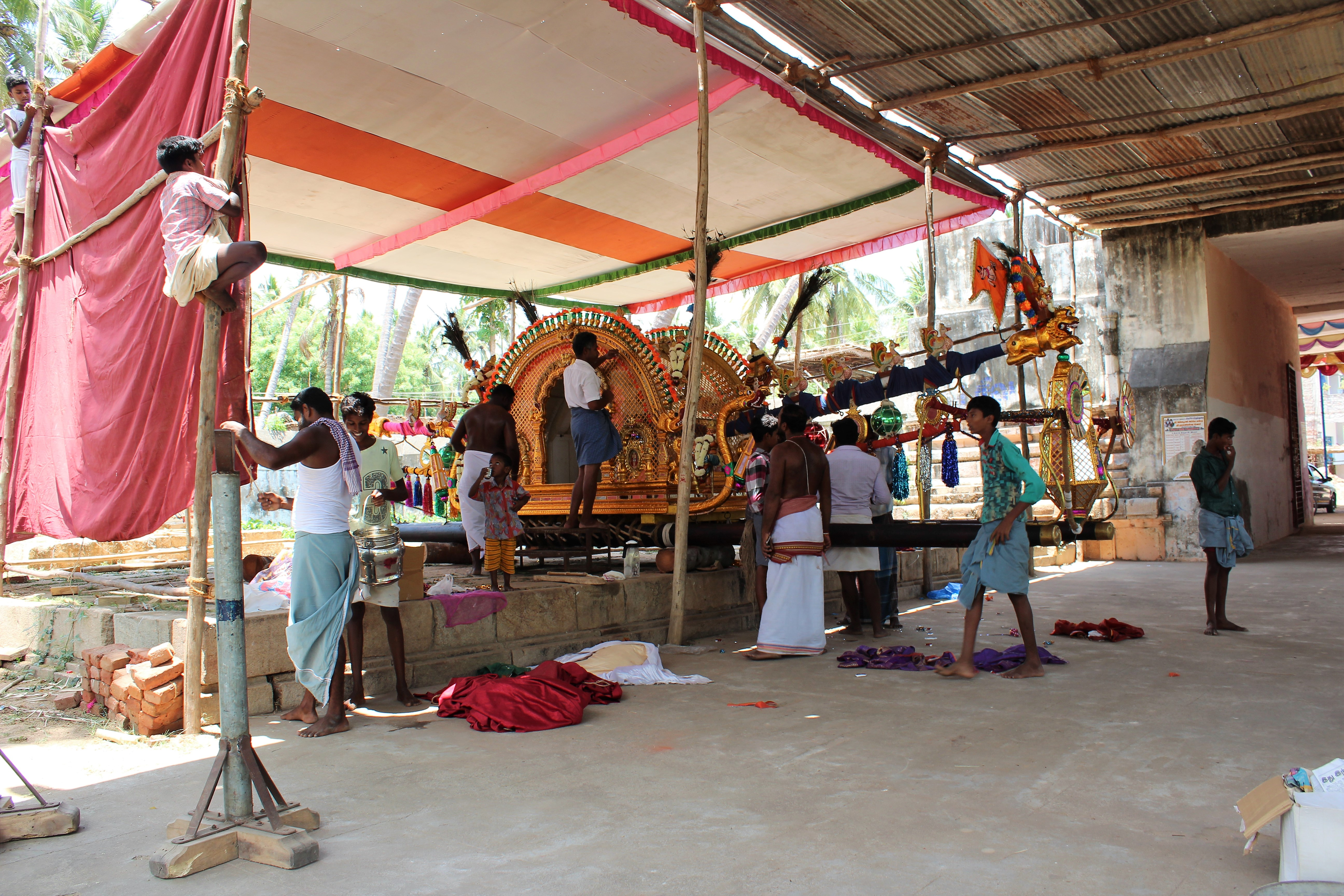
The decorated palanquin used during the festival

Om symbol Sapthastanam Om symbol
The seven important temples in and around Thiruvaiyaru
Temple	Location
Aiyarappar temple	Thiruvaiyaru
Apathsahayar Temple	Thirupazhanam
Odhanavaneswarar Temple	Tiruchotruturai
Vedapuriswarar Temple	Thiruvedhikudi
Kandeeswarar Temple	Thirukkandiyur
Puvananathar Temple	Thirupanturuthi
Neyyadiappar Temple	Tillaistanam

The divine bull Nandi was born in this temple and became the mount of lord Shiva.The divine wedding of Nandi and Suyasayambikai was held at Thirumazhapadi Vaidyanathaswamy temple in Ariyalur district of Tamil Nadu. This is celebrated as Saptha Stanam festival which includes seven Shiva temples of the region. The sapthasthanam festival is conducted at Tiruvaiyaru during April every year. As per Hindu legend, it is the wedding festival of Nandikeswara, the sacred bull of Shiva on the Punarpoosa star during the Tamil month of Panguni. The festival deity of Aiyarappar temple of Thiruvaiyaru is carried in a decorated glass palanquin along with the images of Nandikeswara and Suyasayambikai to the temples in Thirupazhanam, Thiruchottruthurai, Thiruvedhikudi, Thirukandiyur and Thirupoonthurthi. Each of the festival deities of the respective temples mounted in glass palanquins accompany Aiyarppar on the way to the final destiny, Thillaistanam. There is a grand display of fireworks in Cauvery riverbed outside Thillaistanam temple. The seven palanquins are carried to Aiyarappar temple in Thiruvaiyyaru. Hundreds of people witness the convergence of seven glass palanquins carrying principal deities of respective temples from seven places at Tiruvaiyaru. The devotees perform Poochorithal (flower festival) in which a doll offers flowers to the principal deities in the palanquins. After the Poochorithal, the palanquins leave for their respective temples.

== Religious importance ==
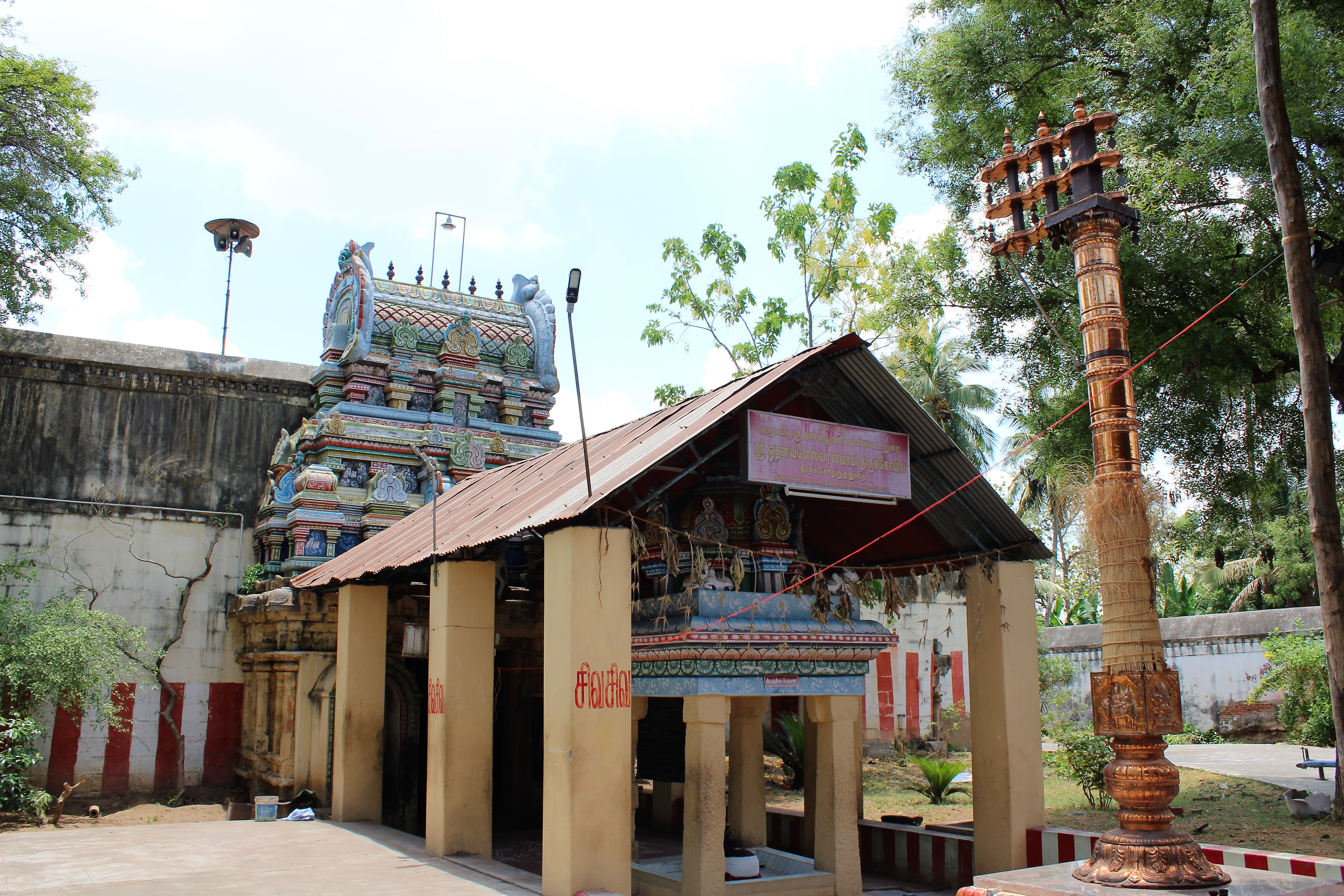
Entrance from the second precicnt

Tirugnana Sambandar, a 7th-century Tamil Saivite poet, venerated Odhavaneswarar in the 28th padigam in Tevaram, compiled in the First Tirumurai. Appar, a contemporary of Sambandar, also venerated Odhanvaneswarar in four padigams in Tevaram, compiled in the fourth, fifth and Sixth Tirumurai. Sundarar, the 8th century Nayanmar revered Odhavaneswarar in a padigam, which is compiled in Seventh Tirumuari. As the temple is revered in Tevaram, it is classified as Paadal Petra Sthalam, one of the 275 temples that find mention in the Saiva canon. The temple is counted as the 13th in the list of temples in the Southern banks of Cauvery. As per accounts in Periya Puranam by Sekkizhar, Sundarar visited multiple Shiva temples in the region and visited this temple. He sung Azhal neer ozhugi anaya in praise of Odhanavaneswarar. Arunagirinathar, the 15th century Saivite saints, has sung praise about the Muruga in the temple. The temple is counted as one of the temples built on the banks of River Kaveri.
