= Vedapuriswarar Temple, Thiruvedhikudi =

Shiva temple in Thanjavur district, Tamil Nadu, India

Vedapuriswarar Temple
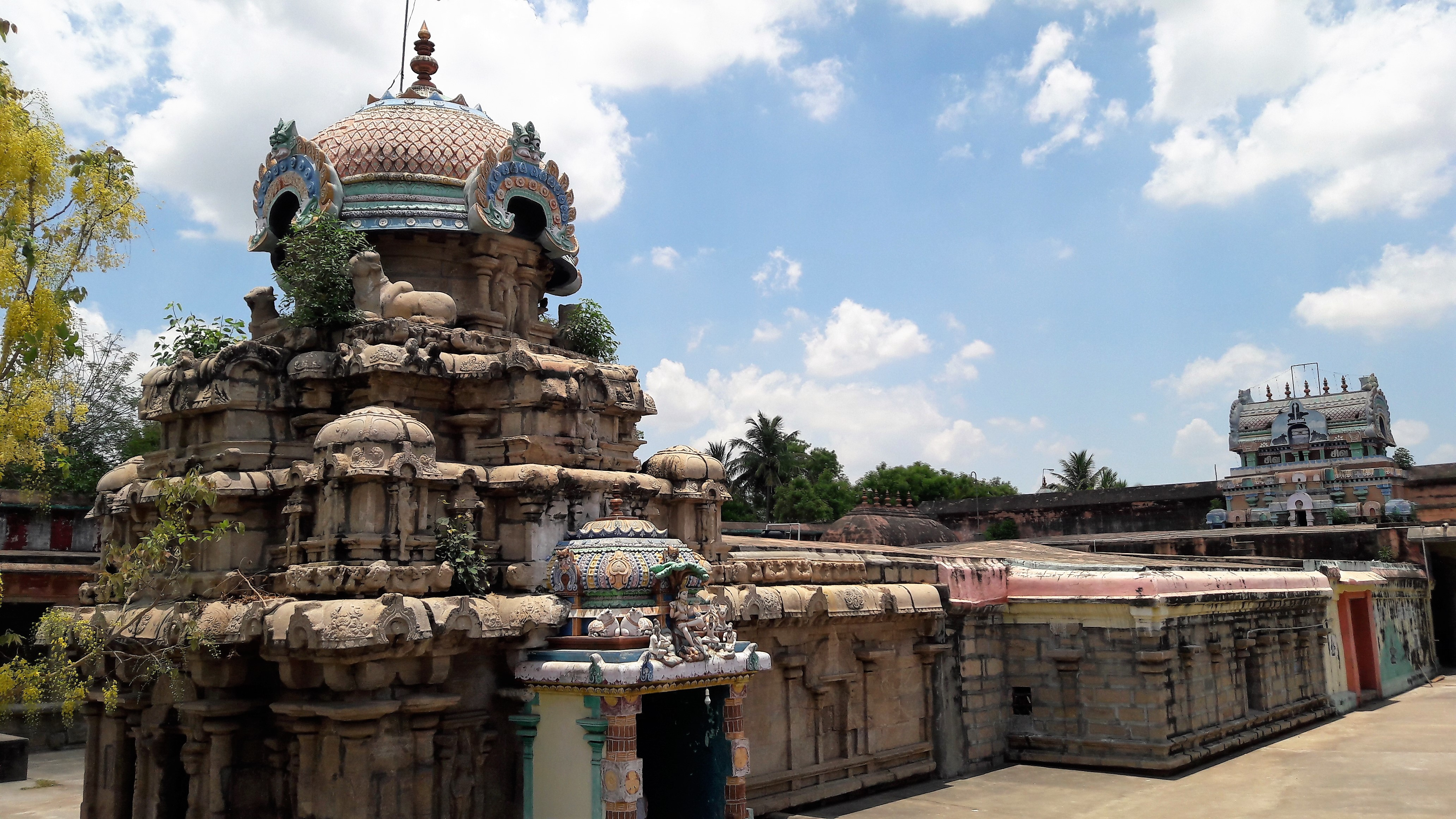

- Location in Tamil Nadu

Religion
- Affiliation: Hinduism
- District: Thanjavur
- Deity: Vedapuriswarar; Vazhaimadunathar (Shiva)

Location
- Location: Thiruvedhikudi
- State: Tamil Nadu
- Country: India
- Coordinates: 10°51′23″N 79°8′14″E

Architecture
- Type: Dravidian architecture

Vedapuriswarar Temple, Thiruvedhikudi or Vazhaimadunathar Temple is a Hindu temple dedicated to Shiva located in Thiruvedhikudi near Tiruvaiyaru, Tamil Nadu, India. The presiding deity is revered in the 7th century Tamil Saiva canonical work, the Tevaram, written by Tamil poet saints known as the nayanars and classified as Paadal Petra Sthalam. The temple is counted as the earliest of all Chola temples.

There are many inscriptions associated with the temple indicating contributions from Cholas, Thanjavur Nayaks and Thanjavur Maratha kingdom. The oldest parts of the present masonry structure were built during the Chola dynasty in the 9th century CE, while later expansions, including the towering gopuram gatehouses, are attributed to later periods, up to the Thanjavur Nayaks during the 16th century.. The temple is maintained and administered by Hindu Religious and Charitable Endowments Department of the Government of Tamil Nadu.

== Religious importance ==
Tirugnana Sambandar, a 7th-century Tamil Saivite poet, venerated Vedhapureeswarar in two padigams in Tevaram, compiled as the Third Tirumurai. Appar, a contemporary of Sambandar, also venerated Vedhapureeswarar in two padigams in Tevaram, compiled in the fourth Tirumurai. As the temple is revered in Tevaram, it is classified as Paadal Petra Sthalam, one of the 275 temples that find mention in the Saiva canon. The temple is counted as the 52nd in the list of temples in the northern banks of Cauvery.

The temple is counted as one of the temples built on the banks of River Kaveri.

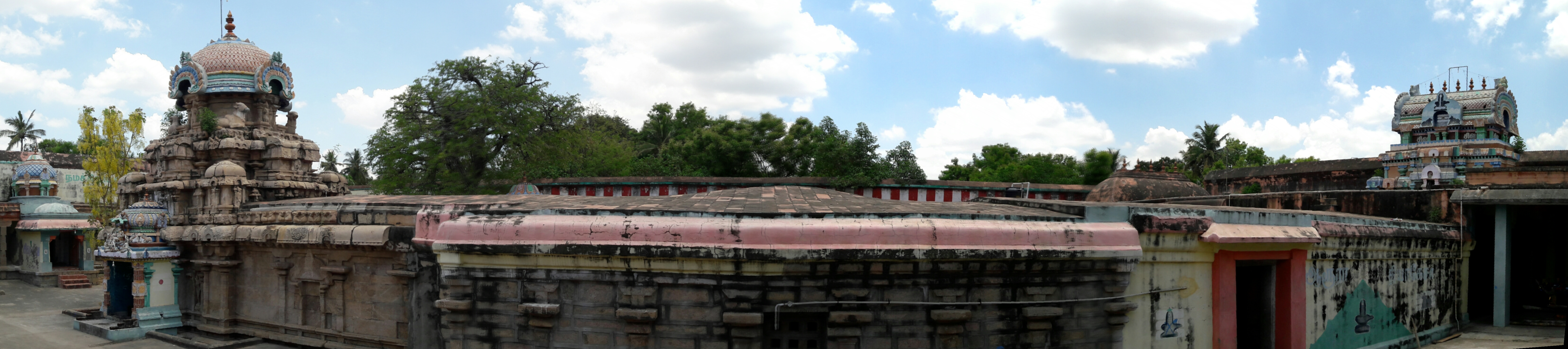
Panorama of the temple

== Saptha Stanam ==
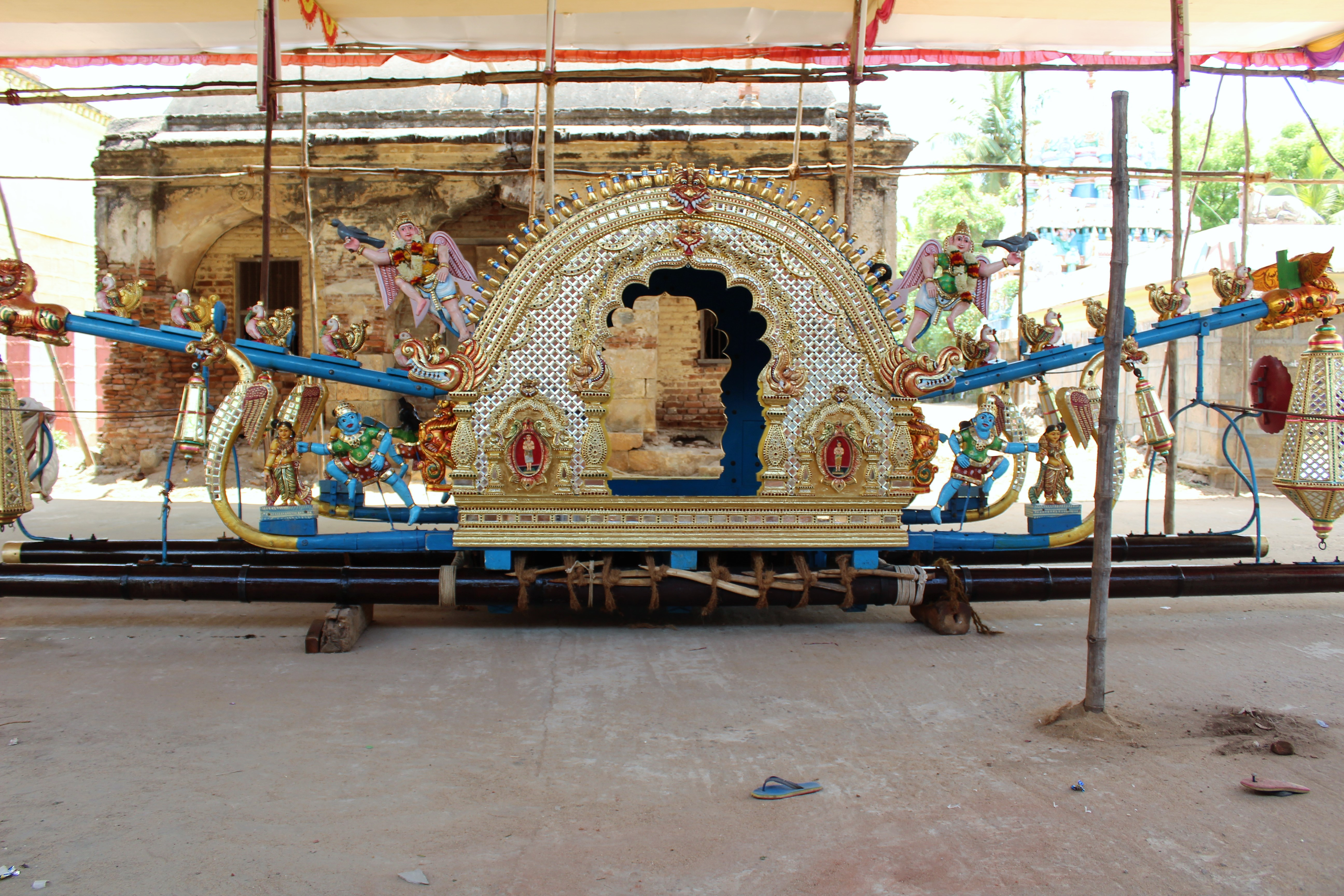
The decorated palanquin used during the festival

Om symbol Sapthastanam Om symbol
The seven important temples in and around Thiruvaiyaru
Temple	Location
Aiyarappar temple	Thiruvaiyaru
Apathsahayar Temple	Thirupazhanam
Odhanavaneswarar Temple	Tiruchotruturai
Vedapuriswarar Temple	Thiruvedhikudi
Kandeeswarar Temple	Thirukkandiyur
Puvananathar Temple	Thirupanturuthi
Neyyadiappar Temple	Tillaistanam

The sapthasthanam festival is conducted at Tiruvaiyaru during April every year. As per Hindu legend, it is the wedding festival of Nandikeswara, the sacred bull of Shiva on the Punarpoosa star during the Tamil month of Panguni. The festival deity of Aiyarappar temple of Thiruvaiyaru is carried in a decorated glass palanquin along with the images of Nandikeswara and Suyasayambikai to the temples in Thirupazhanam, Thiruchottruthurai, Thiruvedhikudi, Thirukandiyur and Thirupoonthurthi. Each of the festival deities of the respective temples mounted in glass palanquins accompany Aiyarppar on the way to the final destiny, Thillaistanam. There is a grand display of fireworks in Cauvery riverbed outside Thillaistanam temple. The seven palanquins are carried to Aiyarappar temple in Thiruvaiyyaru. Hundreds of people witness the convergence of seven glass palanquins carrying principal deities of respective temples from seven places at Tiruvaiyaru. The devotees perform Poochorithal (flower festival) in which a doll offers flowers to the principal deities in the palanquins. After the Poochorithal, the palanquins leave for their respective temples.

== Idol theft ==
The idol of Nataraja belonging to the temple is believed to be stolen and smuggled abroad sometime after 1959, when it was last seen during a record-keeping exercise by the French Institute of Pondicherry. The Idol Wing of the Tamil Nadu Criminal Investigation Department (IW-CID) has traced it to the Asia Society Museum, New York in the United States.
