= Tirunallur =

- village
- Country: India
- State: Tamil Nadu
- District: Thanjavur
- Taluk: Orathanadu

Government
  - Type: Panchayati raj (India)
  - Body: Gram panchayat

Population (2001)
  - Total: 1,779

Languages
  - Official: Tamil
- Time zone: UTC+5:30 (IST)

Tirunallur is a village in the Orathanadu taluk of Thanjavur district, Tamil Nadu, India. The village is famous for the Kalyanasundaresar Temple, Nallur dedicated to Lord Shiva.

== Location ==
The place is located 8 km away from Kumbakonam on the Kumbakonam- Tanjore road. The temple is 3 km away from Sundaraperumal kovil and 1 km from Vazhapazhakadai. The best mode is taking town buses from Kumbakonam or mini buses from Darasuram. The Sundaraperumal kovil railway station is also close by to the temple.

== Demographics ==
As per the 2001 census, Tirunallur had a total population of 1779 with 844 males and 935 females. The sex ratio was 1108. The literacy rate was 57.23.
