= Tiruchotruturai =

Tiruchotruturai is a village in the Thiruvaiyaru taluk of the Thanjavur district in Tamil Nadu, India. The Odhanavaneswarar Temple, a Padal Petra Sthalam dedicated to Shiva, is located here.

== Population ==
According to the 2001 census, the village had a population of 2,202 residents, consisting of 1,093 men and 1,109 women residing in a total of 522 households.. The sex ratio was 1,015. The literacy rate was 67.69.
