= Thiruvedhikudi =

- village
- Country: India
- State: Tamil Nadu
- District: Thanjavur
- Taluk: Thanjavur

Government
  - Type: Panchayati raj (India)
  - Body: Gram panchayat

Population (2001)
  - Total: 1,358

Languages
  - Official: Tamil
- Time zone: UTC+5:30 (IST)

Thiruvedhikudi is a village in the Thanjavur taluk of Thanjavur district, Tamil Nadu, India. The village is famous for the Vedapuriswarar Temple.

== Demographics ==
As per the 2001 census, Thiruvedhikudi had a total population of 1358 with 655 males and 703 females. The sex ratio was 1073. The literacy rate was 67.89.
