= Veerateeswarar temple =

Veerateeswarar temple may refer to several Shiva temples in Tamil Nadu, India:

- Veerateeswarar temple, Thiruvathigai, Cuddalore district
- Veerateeswarar temple, Korukkai, Mayiladuthurai district
- Amritaghateswarar-Abirami Temple, Thirukkadaiyur, Mayiladuthurai district
- Veerateeswarar temple, Thirupariyalur, Keelaparasalur, Mayiladuthurai district
- Veerateeswarar temple, Thiruvirkudi, Mayiladuthurai district
- Veerateeswarar temple, Vazhuvur, Mayiladuthurai district
- Kandeeswarar Temple, Kandiyur, Thanjavur district
- Veerateeswarar temple, Thirukovilur, Tiruvannamalai district
