= Ashta Veeratta Stalam =

Group of eight Hindu temples of Shiva

Ashta Veeratta Stalam (also called Ashtaveertanam or Atta Veeratanam) are the eight temples of Hindu god Shiva, that commemorate his eight acts of valour and fury where he became victorious over demons or divinities. Seven out of these temples are also classified as Paadal Petra Sthalam, the temples of Shiva that are revered in Tevaram (7th century canonical work by the Shaiva Nayanar saints). The presiding deity in all the temples is called Veerateeswarar.

== List of temples ==
Temple locations

S.No.	Name of the temple	Location	Photo	Presiding deity and goddess	Commemorates
1	Veerateeswarar temple, Thirukovilur	Thirukovilur, Kallakurichi district Tamil Nadu; 11°58′17″N 79°12′38″E		Veerateeswarar and Periyanayagi	Shiva's slaying of the demon Andhakasura in the form of Andakasuramurthy.
2	Veerateeswarar temple, Thiruvathigai	Thiruvathigai, Cuddalore; Tamil Nadu; 11.46°N 79.33°E		Veerateeswarar and Mookambigai	Shiva's victory as Tripurantaka, destroyer of the three cities of the demon kingTripurasura or three demon brothers - collectively called as Tripurasura.
3	Veerateeswarar temple, Korukkai	Korukkai, Mayiladuthurai district Tamil Nadu; 11.155340°N 79.611976°E		Veerateeswarar and Gnanambigai	Shiva's victory over the love god Kamadeva. Kamadeva tries to break Shiva's penance so that he can wake up and marry the goddess Parvati. The son of Shiva and Parvati is prophesied to slay the demon Tarakasura. Shiva awakens but in fury, burns Kamadeva by his third eye.
4	Kandeeswarar Temple, Kandiyur	Thirukandiyur, Thanjavur district Tamil Nadu; 10°51′36″N 79°6′30″E		Kandeeswarar and Mangalanayagi	Shiva's form of Bhairava, who cut the fifth head of the god Brahma
5	Amritaghateswarar-Abirami Temple, Thirukkadaiyur	Thirukkadaiyur, Mayiladuthurai district Tamil Nadu; 11°4′39″N 79°49′6″E		Amritaghateswarar Abirami	Shiva's victory as Kalantaka (Conqueror over Time and Death) over the god of death Yama, to proper his devotee Markendeya from death.
6	Veerateeswarar temple, Thirupariyalur	Thirupariyalur, Mayiladuthurai district Tamil Nadu; 11.090815°N 79.725804°E		Veerateeswarar and Ilam Kobanayal	Shiva's victory in the form of Virabhadra over the god Daksha and Destroyer of Daksha's sacrifice (Daksha yajna).
7	Veerateeswarar temple, Vazhuvur	Vazhuvur, Mayiladuthurai district Tamil Nadu; 11.04501°N 79.6378°E		Veerateeswarar and Bala Gujambigai	Shiva's victory as Gajasamharamurti or "slayer of the elephant", where he killed the elephant demon.
8	Veerateeswarar temple, Thiruvirkudi	Tiruvirkudi, Mayiladuthurai district Tamil Nadu; 10.831304°N 79.663743°E		Veerateeswarar and Elavar Kuzhali	Shiva's victory over the demon Jalandhara.
