= Vazhuvoor (disambiguation) =

Vazhuvoor may refer to:

- Vazhuvur - One of the original styles of Bharatanatyam
- Vazhuvoor (village) - A village in the Kuthalam taluk of Nagapattinam District in Tamil Nadu, India
- Vazhuvoor Ramaiah Pillai - A Bharathanatyam teacher from Tamil Nadu
