= Veerateeswarar Temple, Thiruvirkudi =

Hindu temple in Tamil Nadu, India

Veerateswarar temple
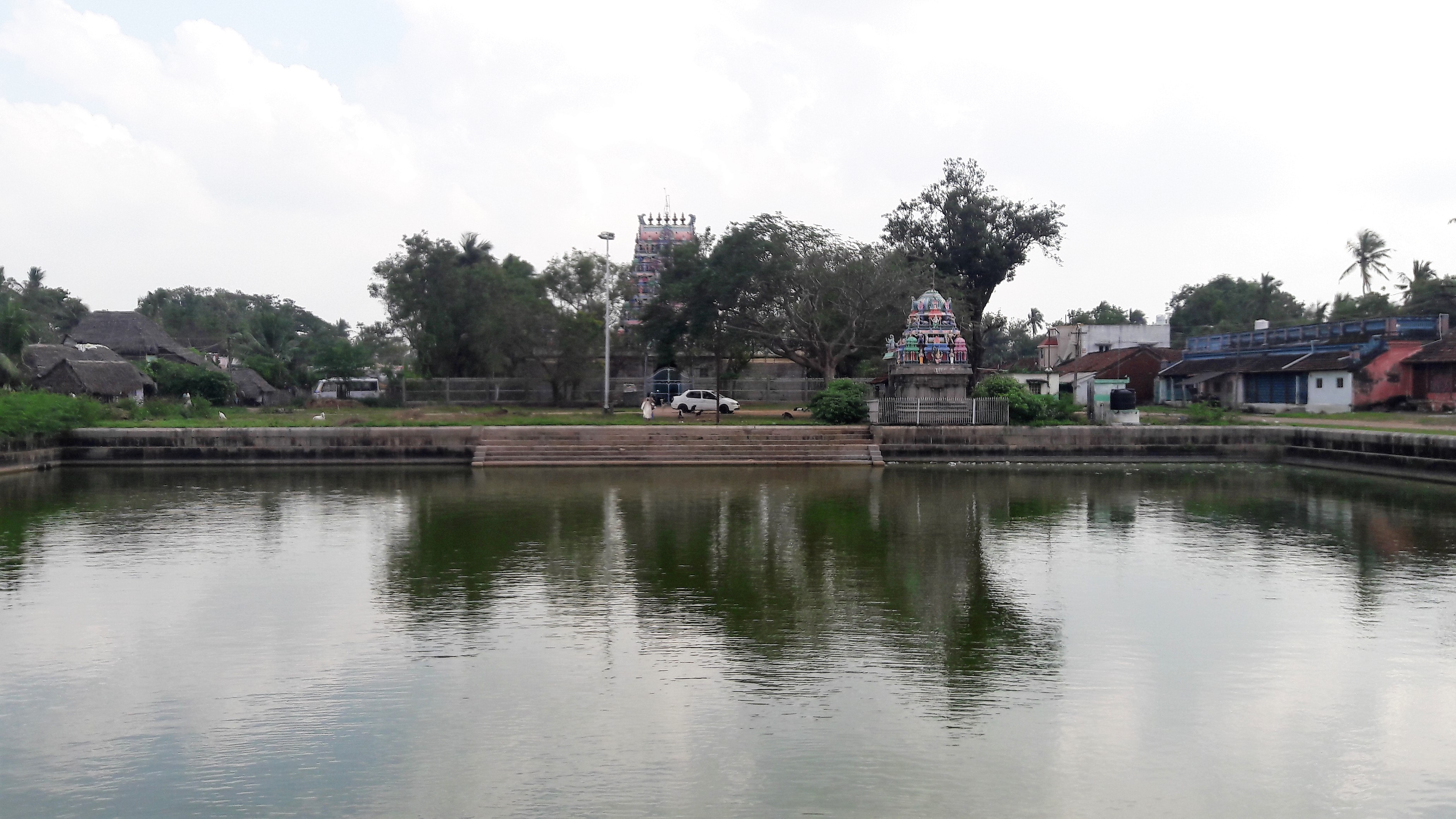
- Gopura of the Veerataneswarar Temple

- Location within Tamil Nadu

Religion
- Affiliation: Hinduism
- District: Mayiladuthurai
- Deity: Veerateeswarar (Shiva)

Location
- Location: Thiruvirkudi
- State: Tamil Nadu
- Country: India
- Coordinates: 10.831304°N 79.663743°E

Architecture
- Type: Dravidian

Veerateeswarar Temple (also called Thiruvirkudi Veerateeswarar temple) is a Hindu temple located at Thiruvirkudi in Mayiladuthurai district of Tamil Nadu, India. The presiding deity is Shiva in the form of Veerateswarar and his consort is known as Elavar Kuzhali. The presiding deity is revered in the 7th century Tamil Saiva canonical work, the Tevaram, written by Tamil saint poets known as the nayanars and classified as Paadal Petra Sthalam, the 276 temples that find mention in it.

As per Hindu legend, Shiva is believed to have destroyed eight different demons and the eight Ashta Veeratanam temples are built signifying each of his victories. The temple is counted one of the eight where Shiva is believed to have punished Jalandhara.

The temple has four daily rituals at various times from 6:30 a.m. to 8:30 p.m., and few yearly festivals on its calendar. The present masonry structure was built during the Chola dynasty during the 9th century, while later expansions are attributed to Thanjavur Nayaks. The temple is maintained and administered by the Dharmapuram Aadhenam.

== Legend ==
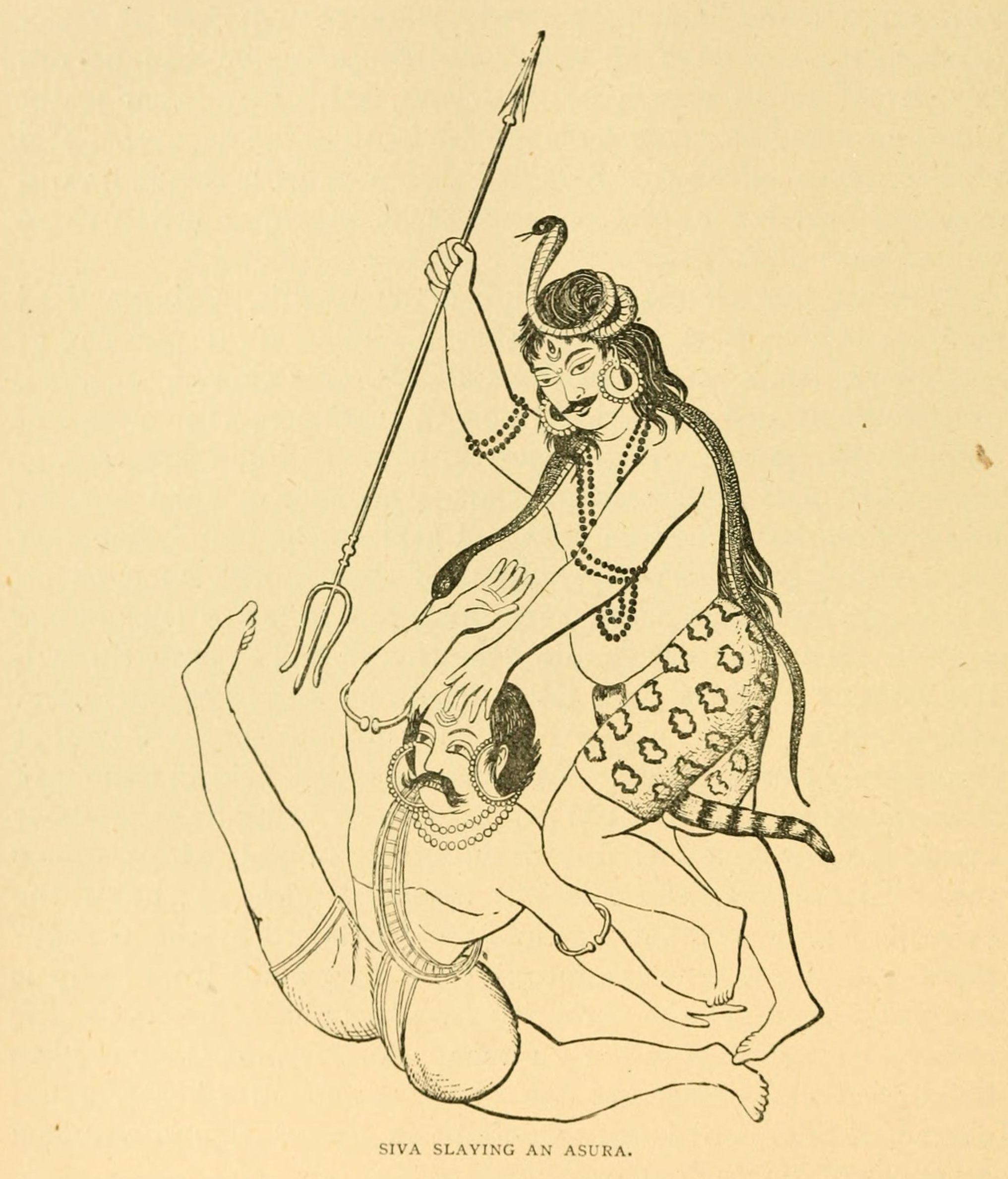
Legend of Shiva slaying a demon

In the Shiva Purana, when Indra and Brihaspati were going towards Mount Kailash to meet Shiva, they met a mendicant on the way who was Shiva himself. Indra did not recognize and was asking him about the whereabouts of Shiva, for which the medicant did not reply. Getting infuriated, Indra used his weapon, the Vajrayudam on Shiva. Shiva was angry at Indra and immediately opened the third eye to destroy Indra. Brihaspati recognized Shiva and prayed to him, requesting him to pardon Indra. To avoid killing Indra, Shiva directed the fire from his eye towards the ocean. The fire when it met with the ocean created an asura who Brahma named Jalandhara as he was born out of ocean. He also told the celestial deities that since he emanated from the third eye of Shiva, he can be killed only by Shiva.

Jalandhara under the aegis of the Guru Sukracharya became very powerful. He defeated all celestial deities and Indra. Indra along with other deities prayed to Shiva to destroy the demon. Jalandhara in the meanwhile, married Tulasi (also called Vrinda), the daughter of the Asura Kalanemi. Her chastity and devotion to the husband, made him even more powerful. Shiva appeared as Veerateewarar (also called Jalandharavathamurthy) There was severe fight between the Shiva and Jalandhara in Virkudi, with both showing equal prowess. Each time Shiva appeared overpowering Jalandhara, Tulasi's chastity was sving him. Vishnu in the meanwhile tricked Tulasi by appearing as a sage and bringing bad dreams to her. She approached the sage for relief, who created a mirage showing Jalandhara being killed by Shiva with the sage bringing him back to life. Tulasi was happy with the replica of Jalandhar, who was Vishnu himself. She lost her chastity on account of the incident. Shiva in the meanwhile, challenged Jalandhara to break a chariot, which he could not. Shiva killed the demon with the chariot. Tulasi, in the meanwhile cursed Vishnu that he would turn into a stone. Pleased by the devotion of her, Vishnu gave her a boon that she will be part of every Vishnu worship and she would acquire equal place in his heart as Lakshmi. Jalandhar, being born out of Shiva, got merged into Shiva.

== Architecture ==
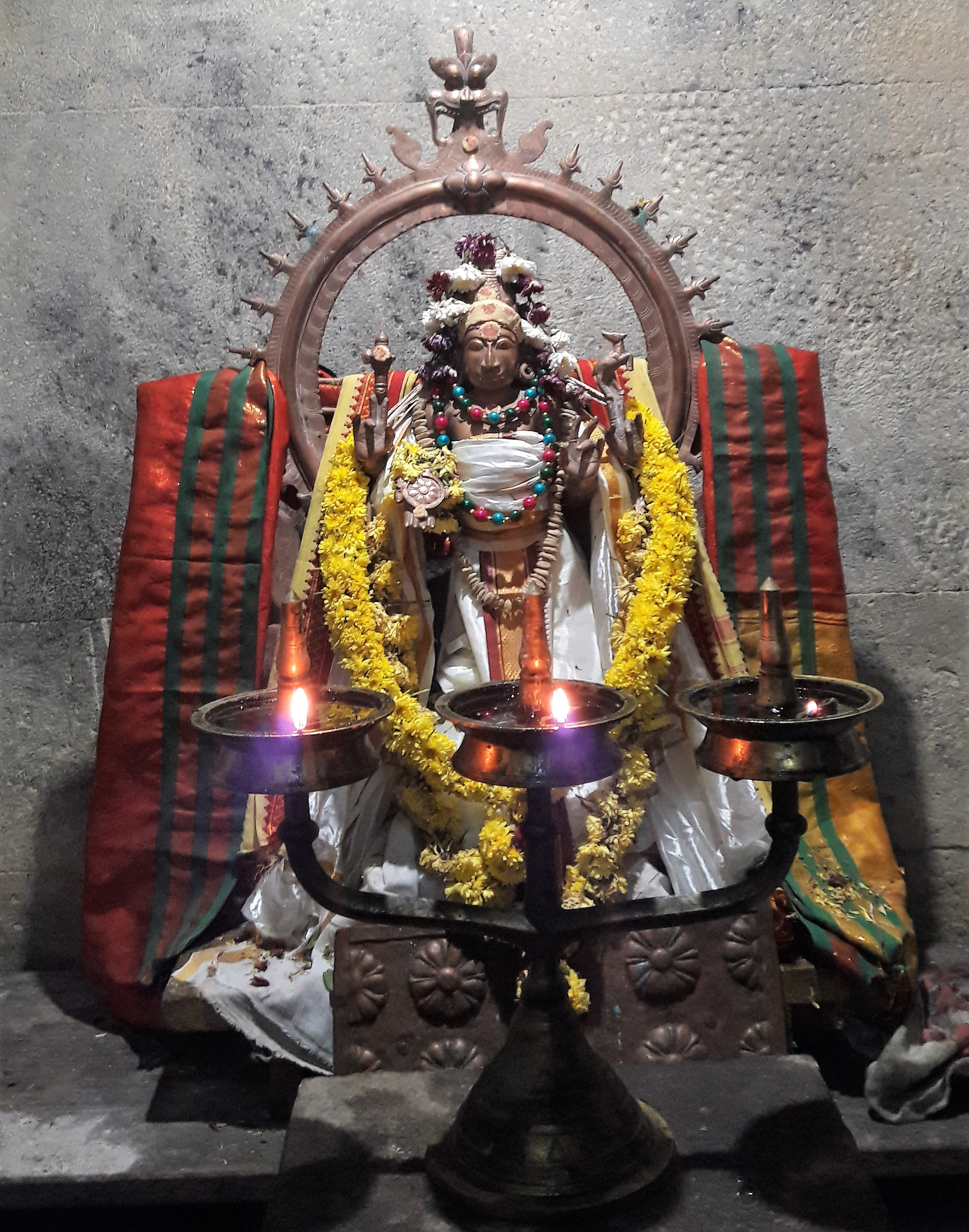
Veerateeswarar image in the temple

The temple is located in Thiruvirkudi, a village 4 km (2.5 mi) away from Moongilkudi in Mayiladuthurai - Thiruvarur road. The temple faces the East and has a five-tiered rajagopuram. The temple tank, the Chakra Theertham is located outside the main entrance and another water body named Sangu Theertham is located behind the temple. The sanctum houses the image of Veeratneeswarar in the form of lingam. The sanctum has ardhamandapa before it and a Mahamandapa, the worship hall. The Mahamandapa houses the metal image of Kamadahanamurthy sported with six hands holding six different weapons. There are metal images of festival deities in the Mahamandapa. The Mahamandapam also houses other metal image of Murugan, Somaskanda and Vinayagar. The important image is that of Jalandharavathamurthy, a panchaloha image sported with chakra in right hand and various weapons in the other hands. The shrine of Ambal in the form of Elavar Kuzhali faces South. The image is sported in standing posture with four hands. The ceiling in the hall before the Ambal shrine has the twelve zodiac signs. The temple has two precincts and all the shrines in the temple are enshrined in rectangular granite walls. The outer precinct has the image of Vishnu and Tulsi built shrine, which is also believed to be the place where Vishnu worshipped Shiva.

== Religious significance ==
As per Hindu legend, Shiva is believed to have destroyed eight different demons namely Andakasuran, Gajasuran, Jalandasuran, Thirupuradhi, Kaman, Arjunan, Dakshan and Taaragasuran. There are Ashta Veeratanam temples built signifying each of his victories in the war, and also as places where he is believed to have performed with fury. The eight temples are: Tiruvadigai Veerattaaneswarar Temple at Thiruvadigai, Tirukkovilur Veerateshwarar Temple at Tirukoilur, Veerateswarar temple at Thiruvirkudi or Thirukkurukkai, Amirtagateswarar Temple at Thirukadaiyur, Vazhuvur Verateswarar Temple at Vazhuvoor, Keelaparasalur Veerateswarar Temple at Tirupariyalur, Kandeeswarar Temple at Thirukkandiyur and Tiruvirkudi Veerataneswarar Temple at Thiruvirkudi. Shiva in all these temples are described to have used bow and arrow, trident and spear.

It is one of the shrines of the 275 Paadal Petra Sthalams - Shiva Sthalams glorified in the early medieval Tevaram poems by Tamil Saivite Nayanar Sambandar. The ten songs of Sambandar are compiled in second Thirumurai as 108th canto.

Tirugnanasambandar describes the feature of the deity as:

செங்கண் மாலொடு நான்முகன் தேடியுந் திருவ டியறியாமை

எங்கு மாரெரி யாகிய இறைவனை யறைபுனன் முடியார்ந்த
வெங்கண் மால்வரைக் கரியுரித் துகந்தவன் விற்குடி வீரட்டம்

தங்கை யால்தொழு தேத்தவல் லாரவர் தவமல்கு குணத்தாரே.

== Festival and religious practices ==
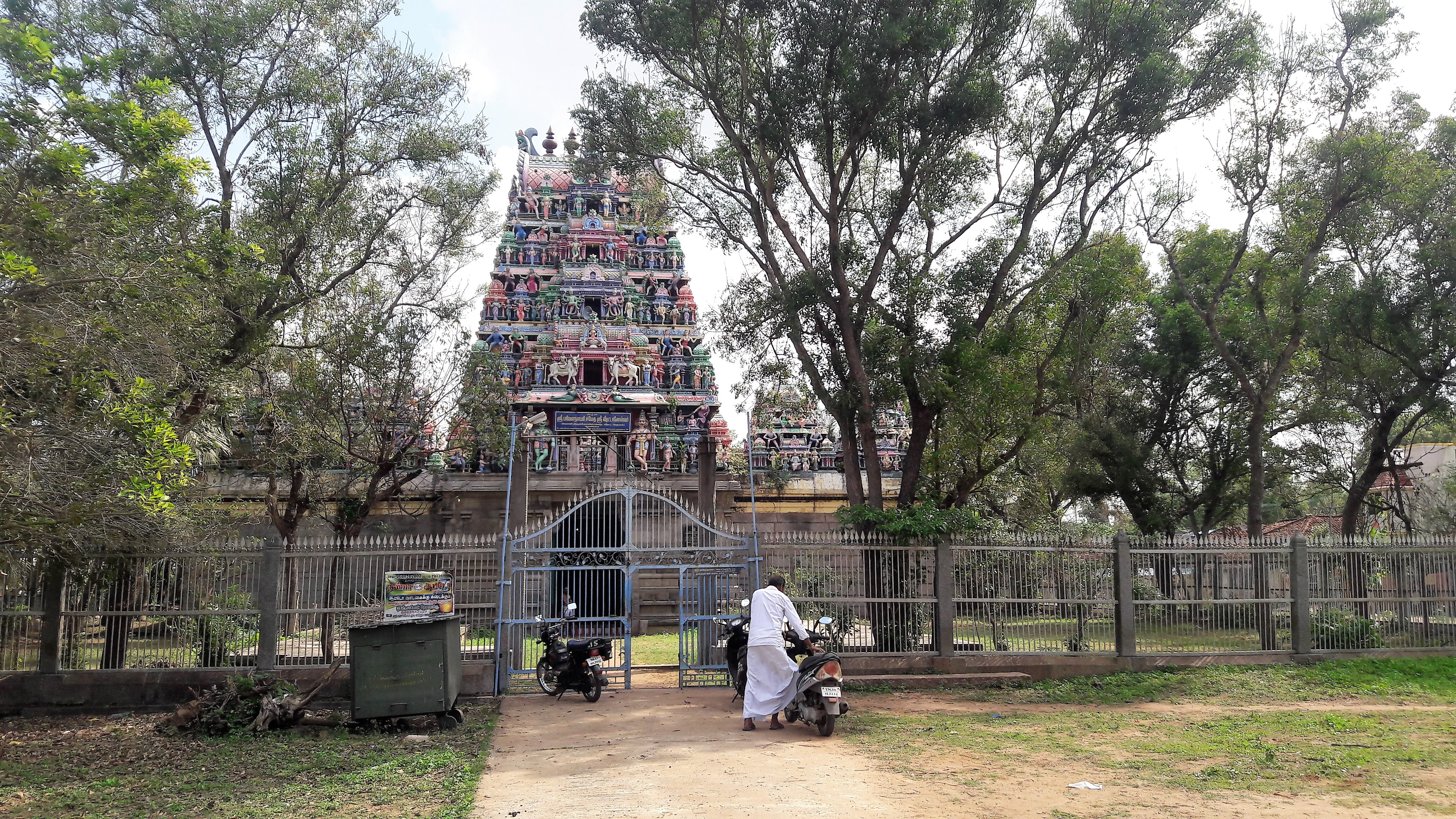
Outer view of the temple

The temple priests perform the pooja (rituals) during festivals and on a daily basis. Like other Shiva temples of Tamil Nadu, the priests belong to the Shaivaite community, a Brahmin sub-caste. The temple rituals are performed four times a day; Kalasanthi at 7:00 a.m., Uchikalam at 10:00 a.m., Sayarakshai at 6:00 p.m. and Ardha Jamam at 8:30 p.m. Each ritual comprises four steps: abhisheka (sacred bath), alangaram (decoration), neivethanam (food offering) and deepa aradanai (waving of lamps) for both Veerateeswarar and Elavar Kuzhali. The worship is held amidst music with nagaswaram (pipe instrument) and tavil (percussion instrument), religious instructions in the Vedas read by priests and prostration by worshippers in front of the temple mast. There are weekly rituals like somavaram and sukravaram, fortnightly rituals like pradosham and monthly festivals like amavasai (new moon day), kiruthigai, pournami (full moon day) and sathurthi. There is a temple procession during the Tamil month of Margazhi (December- January) Thiruvadhirai festival. Masimagam during (February - March) followed by 10-day Brahmostavam are the major festivals in the temple.
