= Veerateeswarar Temple, Thirupariyalur =

Hindu temple in Tamil Nadu, India

Veerataneswarar temple
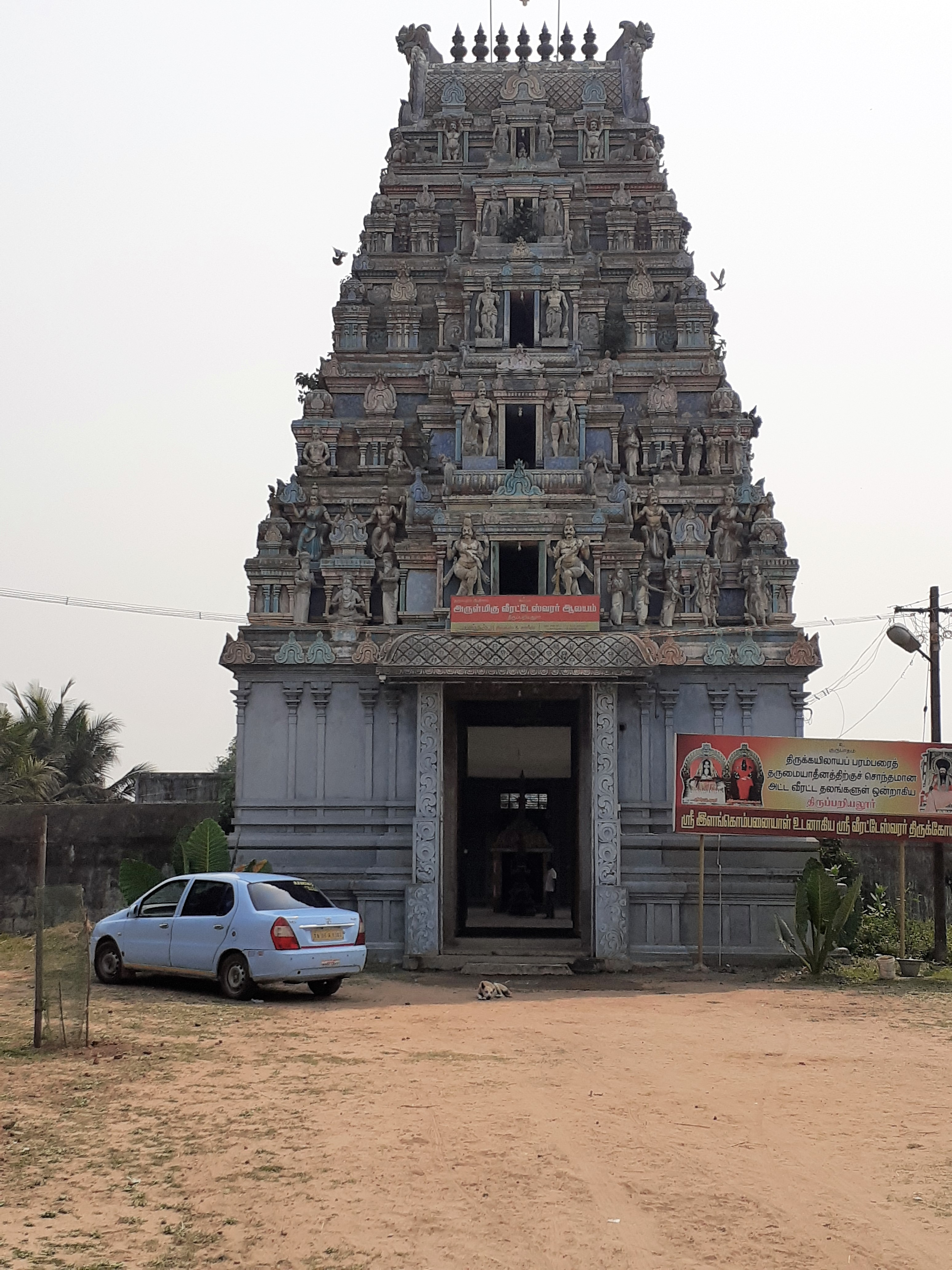
- Gopura of the Veerataneswarar Temple

- Location within Tamil Nadu

Religion
- Affiliation: Hinduism
- District: Mayiladuthurai
- Deity: Veerataneswarar (Shiva)

Location
- Location: Keelaparasalur
- State: Tamil Nadu
- Country: India
- Coordinates: 11.090815°N 79.725804°E

Architecture
- Type: Dravidian

Veerateswarar Temple (also called Dakshapureeswarat temple) is a Hindu temple located at Keelaparasalur (formerly known as Thirupariyalur) in the Sembanarkoil block of Mayiladuthurai district of Tamil Nadu, India. The historical name of the place is Tirupparialur. The presiding deity is Shiva in the form of Veerateswarar and his consort is known as Ilam Kobanayal. The presiding deity is revered in the 7th century Tamil Saiva canonical work, the Tevaram, written by Tamil saint poets known as the nayanars and classified as Paadal Petra Sthalam, the 276 temples that find mention in it.

As per Hindu legend, Shiva is believed to have destroyed eight different demons and the eight Ashta Veeratanam temples are built signifying each of his victories. The temple is counted one of the eight where Shiva is believed to have punished Daksha.

The temple has four daily rituals at various times from 6:30 a.m. to 9:30 p.m., and few yearly festivals on its calendar. The present masonry structure was built during the Chola dynasty in the 9th century, while later expansions are attributed to Thanjavur Nayaks. The temple is maintained and administered by the Dharmapuram Aadhenam.

== Legend ==
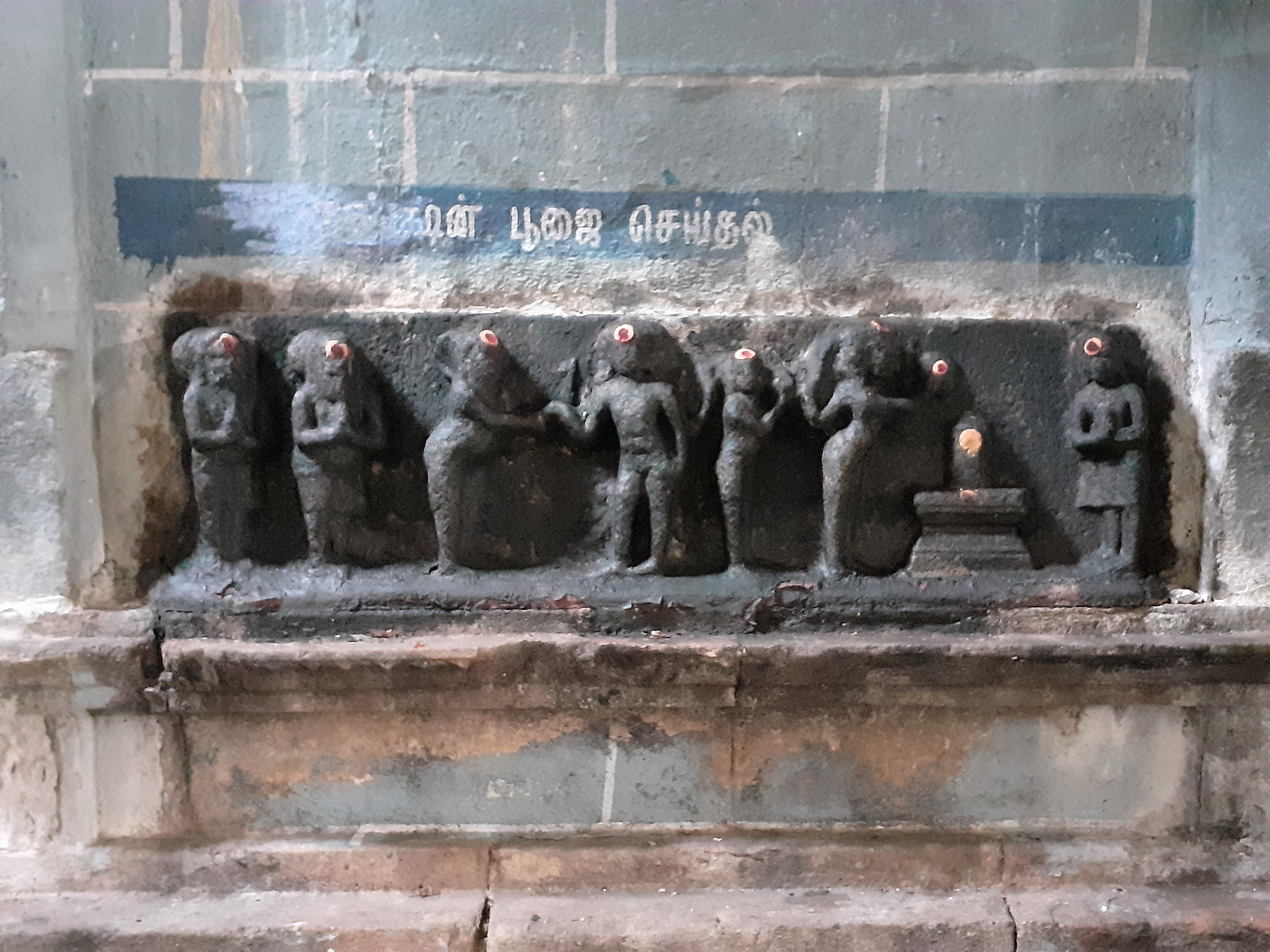
Temple legend in sculpture

As per Hindu legend, Dakshayani (also called Sati), the daughter of Daksha, married Hindu god Shiva. Daksha organised a huge Yajna, invited all the demigods and sages, and intentionally avoided Shiva and Dakshayani. Daksha yajna was an important turning point in the creation and development of sects in Hinduism. It is the story behind the 'Stala Purana' (Origin story of Temples) of Shakta pithas. Dakshayani wanted to meet her sisters and father, though her father had not invited her husband. Shiva discouraged her from attending the event as an uninvited guest, but she persisted and attended the event. Daksha insulted her and her husband in front of the guests. She was insisting on depicting the havirbhaga, the prime offering of the yajna to her husband, which Daksha refused. She was unable to bear the insult, ran into the sacrificial fire and immolated herself.

Shiva, upon hearing the terrible incident became furious and invoked Veerabhadra and Bhadrakali by plucking a lock of hair and thrashing it on the ground. Veerabhadra and the Bhoota ganas marched south and destroyed all the premises of Daksha, who was decapitated. Daksha's wives were pleading with Shiva, upon whose request Shiva forgave and brought him to life by attaching a goat's head. The Yajna was allowed to be completed in the presence of all demi-gods and sages. The place came to be known as Dakshapuram (place of Dakhsan) and since Shiva destroyed the wrongdoings of all the celestial deities for attending the yagna in his absence, it came to be known as Pariyalur (pari in Tamil means taking away).

== Architecture ==
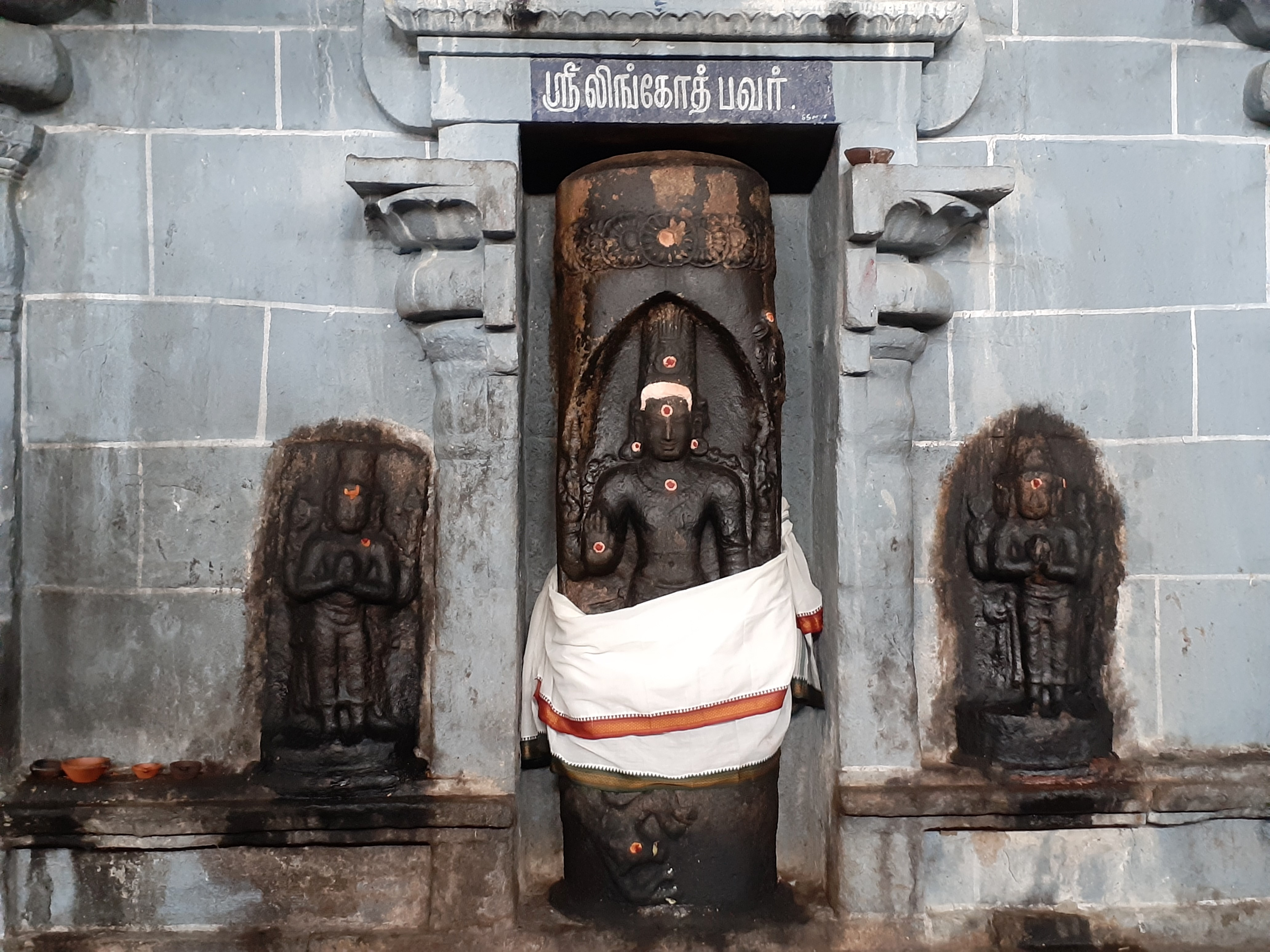
Lingobhava in the temple

The temple is located in Pariyalur, a village 2 km (1.2 mi) away from Sembanarkoil in Mayiladuthurai - Tharangambadi road. The temple faces south and has a five-tiered rajagopuram. The sanctum houses the image of Dakshipureeswarar in the form of lingam and on the walls of the sanctum, there is a sculptural panel where Daksha is depicted worshipping Shiva. The lingam is square in shape and believed to be selfformed. The sanctum has ardhamandapa before it and a Mahamandapa, the worship hall. The Mahamandapa houses the metal image of Dakshasamharamurthy sported with six hands holding six different weapons. There is a metal plaque at the footsteps of the utsava image indicating Brahma starting the yagna of Daksha. The Mahamandapam also houses other metal images of Murugan, Somaskanda, Vinayagar and Pradoshanayagar. The shrine of Ambal in the form of Ilangodiamman faces west. The image is sported in standing posture with four hands. The temple has two precincts and all the shrines in the temple are enshrined in rectangular granite walls. The five-tiered rajagopuram is a recent addition to the temple. The temple does not have the Navagrahas, the nine planetary deities, but just Surya, the Sun god. The temple is administered by Dharmapuram Adheenam.

== Religious significance ==
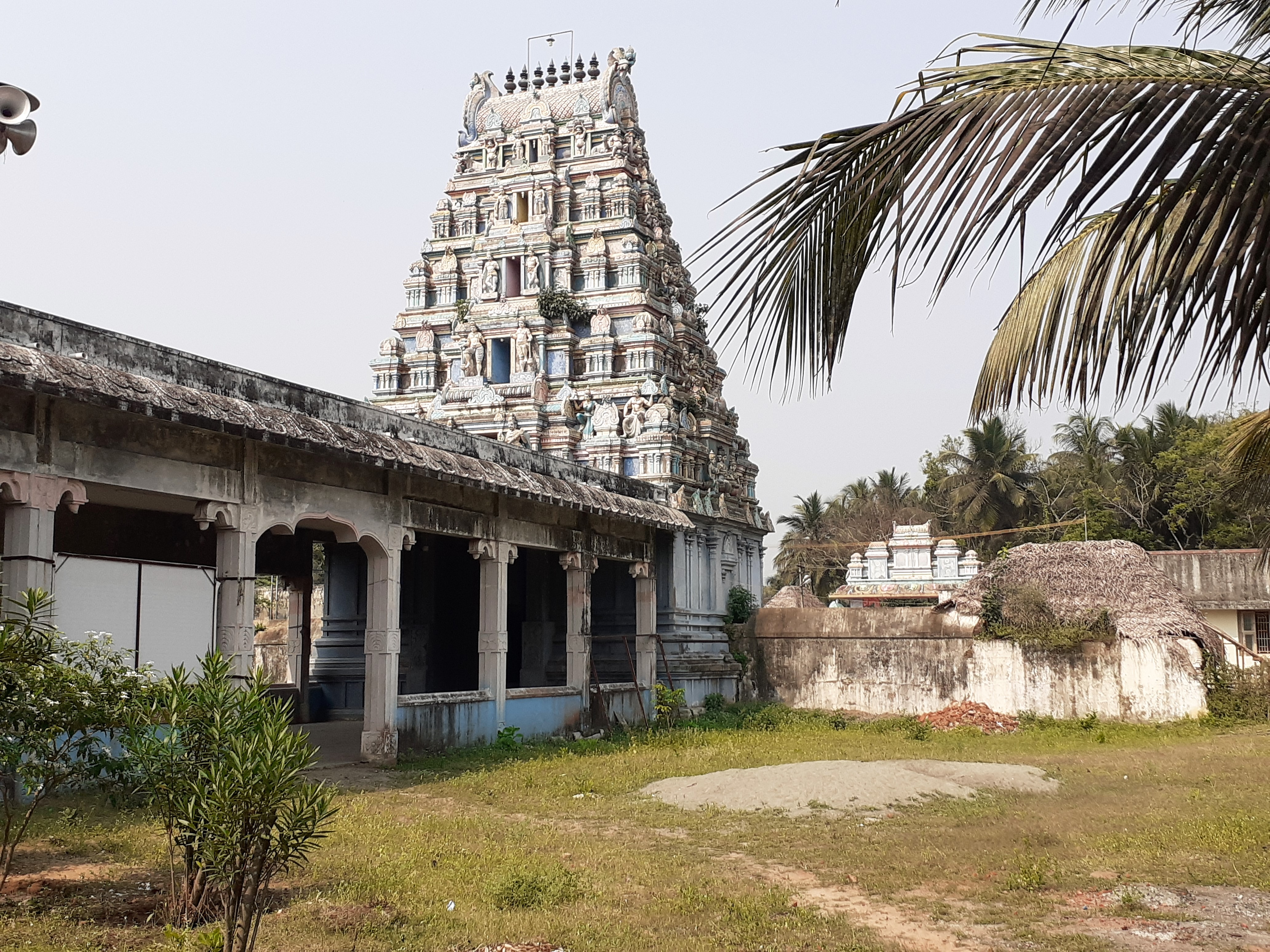
View of the gopuram of the temple

It is one of the shrines of the 275 Paadal Petra Sthalams - Shiva Sthalams glorified in the early medieval Tevaram poems by Tamil Saivite Nayanar Tirugnanasambandar. As per legend, Shiva is believed to have destroyed eight different demons namely Andakasuran, Gajasuran, Jalandasuran, Thirupuradhi, Kaman, Arjunan, Dakshan and Taaragasuran. There are Ashta Veeratanam temples built signifying each of his victories in the war, and also as places where he is believed to have performed with fury. The eight temples are: Tiruvadigai Veerattaaneswarar Temple at Thiruvadigai, Tirukkovilur Veerateshwarar Temple at Tirukoilur, Veerateswarar temple at Korukkai or Thirukkurukkai, Amirtagateswarar Temple at Thirukadaiyur, Vazhuvur Verateswarar Temple at Vazhuvoor, Keelaparasalur Veerateswarar Temple at Tirupariyalur, Kandeeswarar Temple at Thirukkandiyur and Tiruvirkudi Veerataneswarar Temple at Thiruvirkudi. Shiva in all these temples are described to have used bow and arrow, trident and spear.vThe temple is counted as one of the temples built on the banks of River Kaveri.

Tirugnanasambandar describes the feature of the deity as:

விளங்கொண் மலர்மே லயனோத வண்ணன்

துளங்கும் மனத்தார் தொழத்தழ லாய்நின்றான்
இளங்கொம் பனாளோ டிணைந்தும் பிணைந்தும்

விளங்குந் திருப்பறியல் வீரட்டத் தானே.

== Festival and religious practices ==
The temple priests perform the pooja (rituals) during festivals and on a daily basis. Like other Shiva temples of Tamil Nadu, the priests belong to the Shaivaite community, a Brahmin sub-caste. The temple rituals are performed four times a day; Kalasanthi at 7:00 a.m., Uchikalam at 10:00 a.m., Sayarakshai at 6:00 p.m. and Ardha Jamam at 8:30 p.m. Each ritual comprises four steps: abhisheka (sacred bath), alangaram (decoration), neivethanam (food offering) and deepa aradanai (waving of lamps) for both Amritaghateswar and Abhirami Amman. The worship is held amidst music with nagaswaram (pipe instrument) and tavil (percussion instrument), religious instructions in the Vedas read by priests and prostration by worshippers in front of the temple mast. There are weekly rituals like somavaram and sukravaram, fortnightly rituals like pradosham and monthly festivals like amavasai (new moon day), kiruthigai, pournami (full moon day) and sathurthi. There is a temple procession during the Sundays of the Tamil month of Karthigai.
