= Kanaka Srinivasan =

Indian classical dancer of Bharat Natyam

- Born: India
- Occupation: Classical dancer
- Known for: Bharat Natyam
- Awards: Padma Shri; Sangeet Natak Akademi Award

Kanaka Srinivasan is an Indian classical dancer and one of the leading exponents of the classical dance form of Bharat Natyam. She is a disciple of Vazhuvoor B. Ramaiyah Pillai and is aligned with Vazhuvur tradition of the dance form. She is a recipient of the Sangeet Natak Akademi Award of 1998. The Government of India awarded her the fourth highest civilian honour of the Padma Shri, in 2006, for her contributions to Indian classical dance.

== See also ==
- Vazhuvoor
- Vazhuvoor B. Ramaiyah Pillai
