= Vazhuvoor (village) =

Vazhuvoor (also written as Valuvur, Vazhuvur, Valuvoor) is a village in the Kuthalam taluk of Mayiladuthurai district in Tamil Nadu, India. Its postal code is 609401 and STD code is 04364.

== Location ==
8 kilometers south of Mayiladuthurai, (Note: Formerly known as Mayavaram or Mayooram) Vazhuvoor is located at 11.04 latitude and 79.63 longitude. Mayiladuthurai, Thirupanandal, Tiruvidaimarudur, Semponnarkoil are other taluks around.

Seergazhi, Tharangambadi, Karaikal, Thiruvarur, Therazhundur, Thirumanancheri are nearest towns.
Ilanthangudi, Thirunalkondacheri, Poovalai and Matha Koil are small villages in the locality.

== Access ==
Mayiladuthurai is the major town nearby connected by rail and road with all over India. The nearest railway station, Kuthalam, (Note: The Indian Railway has named the railway station here as Kutralam) is one kilometer away.
However, those travelling by express trains should disembark at Mayiladuthurai and proceed to Vazhuvur by road.

== Temples in Vazhuvoor ==
- Sri Veerabadraswami (Vazhikaraiyan) temple
- Sri Veeratteswar temple

== Popularity ==
Vazhuvoor is a popular name because it is the name given to a style of Bharatanatyam, a traditional dance form of Tamil Nadu. This style was introduced and was made famous by Vazhuvoor B. Ramiah Pillai, Vazhuvoor R.Samraj who hailed from this village.
