= Gajasurasamhara =

Form of Hindu god Shiva

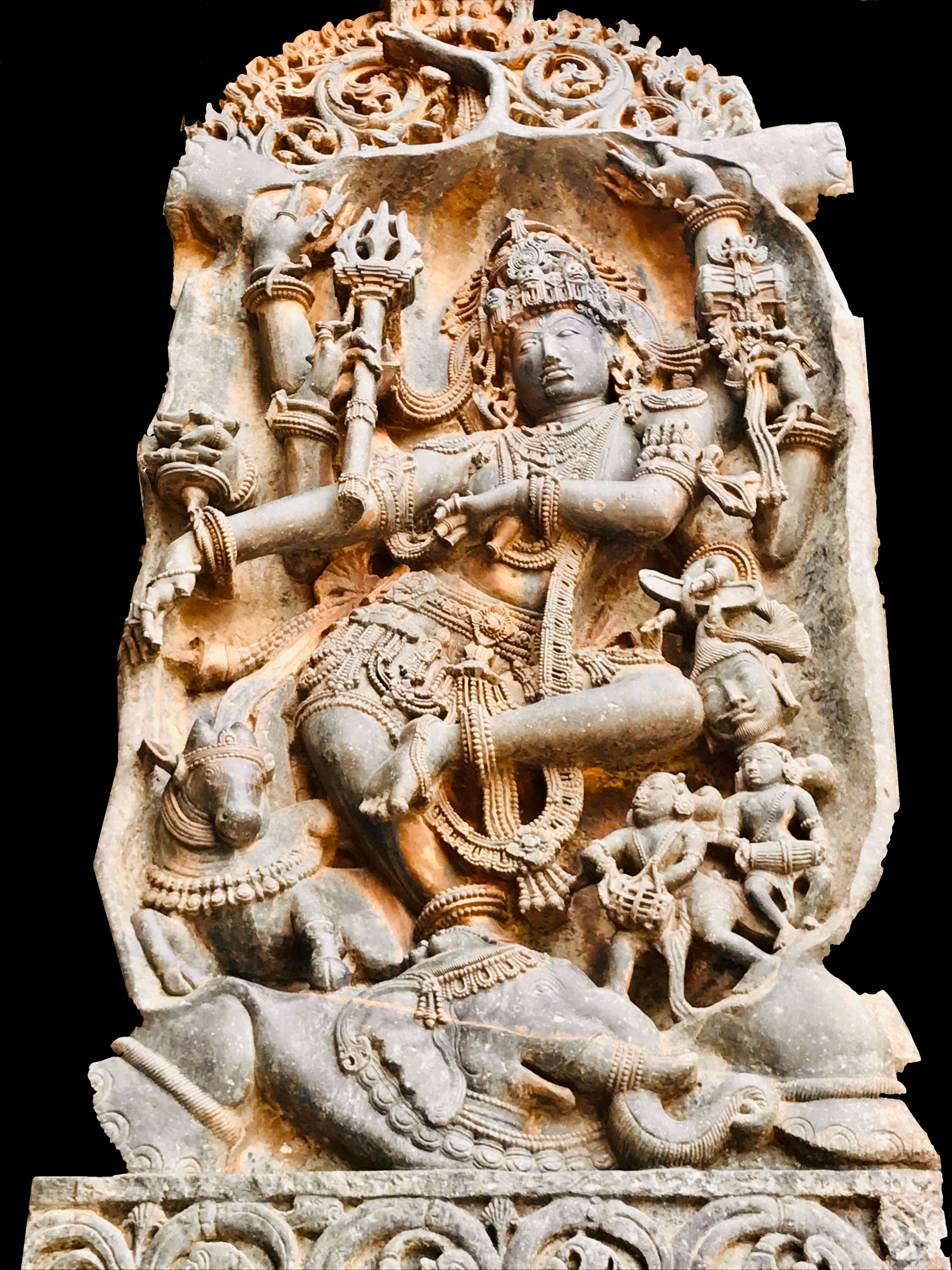
Gajasurasamhara panel at Hoysaleswara temple, Halebidu

Gajasurasamhara (Sanskrit: गजासुरसंहार, romanized: Gajāsurasaṃhāra, lit. 'the slayer of the elephant-demon'), also known as Gajasamhara, Gajantaka, Gajaha ('slayer of the elephant') and Matangari ('the enemy of the elephant'), is a fierce aspect of the Hindu god Shiva as the destroyer of the elephant-demon, Gajasura. The icon is popular in Pallava and Chola art, which portray him dancing vigorously in the flayed elephant hide of Gajasura.

The chief temple of Gajasurasamhara is at Valuvur, Tamil Nadu, where the chief icon is an eight-armed bronze Gajasurasamhara. Valuvur is one of the Atta-virattam temples, the eight sites of the heroic acts of Shiva.

== Textual references and legend ==
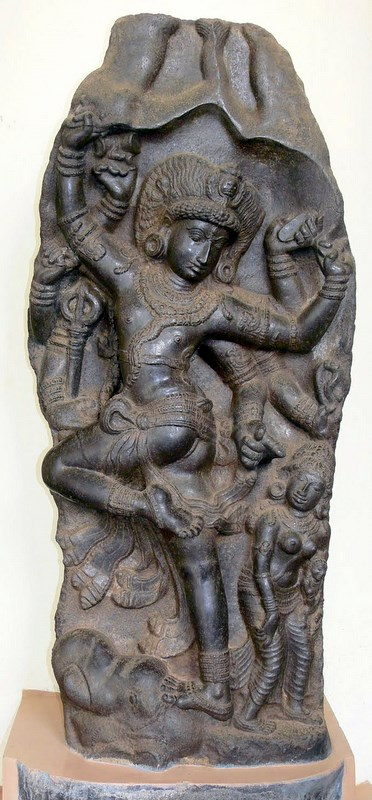
Gajasamharamurti, Darasuram, Nayak Palace Art Museum, Thanjavur

The Gajasurasamhara form is associated by scholars to the epithet Krittivasa ('he who has skin as his garment'), used in the Vedic hymn Shri Rudram for Rudra, a Vedic deity associated with Shiva. The devotional hymns of the Tevaram refer to Shiva the one who wears the elephant hide, alluding to this incident. The Shiva Sahasranama ('the thousand names of Shiva') describe Shiva as Gajaha, the slayer of the elephant.

The Kurma Purana describes the tale of Gajasurasamhara, when discussing the Krittivashvara ('the lord who has skin as his garment') lingam (the aniconic form of Shiva) of Varanasi. When an asura assumed the form of an elephant and terrorized Brahmins who were worshipping the lingam, Shiva emerged from this lingam, slew the asura, and removed the elephant skin, thereafter wearing the hide on his upper body.

Another version narrates that Gajasura gained various powers by practising severe penance. However, he got proud and started harassing, robbing and killing people. Even the gods feared him. One day, Gajasura attacked the devotees of Shiva in Varanasi and Shiva appeared to rescue them and ripped the elephant's body. Valuvur, where the chief temple of Gajasurasamhara, is sometimes described as the place where the incident occurred, instead of Varanasi.

Another version of the tale is given in the Varaha Purana. It relates Gajasurasamhara to Shiva's visit to the Deodar Forest (Darukavana) to teach a lesson to arrogant sages. Shiva visits the Forest as a young naked mendicant, with the enchantress Mohini as his wife. While the sages fall for Mohini, the women wildly chase Shiva. When the sages regain their senses, they perform a black magic sacrifice, which produces an elephant-demon called Gajasura, which attacks Shiva, who slays him and wears his hide.

== Iconography ==
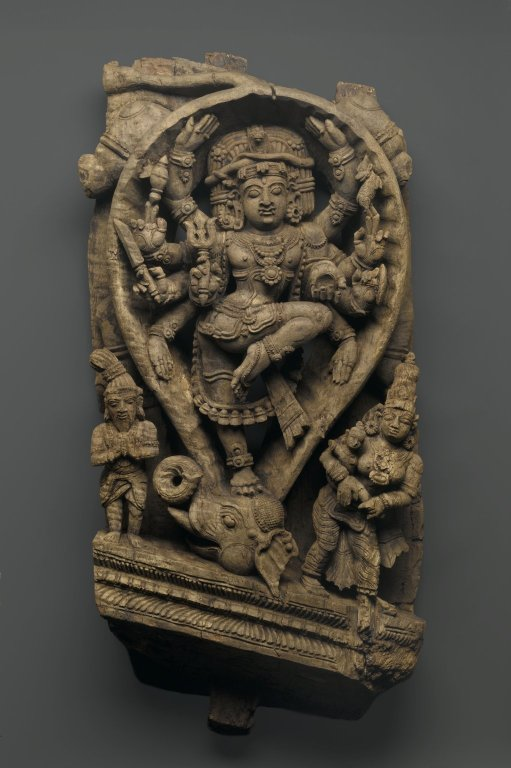
A rare instance where iconographical treatises are fully followed

Texts

According to the iconographical treatise Amshumadbhedagama, Gajasurasamhara-Shiva dancing inside the skin of the slain elephant, which is arranged like a prabhamandala (aureole) around him. The tail pips behind from Shiva's crown and his left leg is on the head of the elephant, while the right one is bent and raised above the left thigh (utkutikasana posture). Shiva wears silk and tiger skin garments and various ornament and is deep red in colour. He may be depicted four or eight armed. In the four-armed image, Shiva holds a pasha (noose) in one of the right hands and the elephant tusk in a left arm; the other arms hold the outstretched skin of the elephant. In the eight-armed form, he holds a trishula (trident), a damaru (drum), a pasha and the elephant skin in his right arms, while the one of left hands makes the vismaya mudra (sign of astonishment) and others hold a kapala (skullcup), the tusk and the skin of the elephant. Another eight-armed form in the same text holds a trishula, a sword, the tusk and the elephant skin in the left arms and a kapala, a shield, a ghanta (bell) and the elephant skin in the right ones. On the left side of Shiva, his consort Parvati should stand with their son Skanda in her arms, both trembling in fear of this fierce aspect of Shiva.

The Suprabhedagama prescribes a ten-armed Gajasurasamhara should hold an akshamala (rosary), a sword, a shaktyayudha (power-weapon), a danda (staff), a trishula in right hands and a khatvanga (skull-staff), snake, skull, shield and a deer in the left.

Depictions

In sculpture, Gajasurasamhara is often pictured with eight or sixteen arms. These multiple arms are uncommon in Shiva's iconography and are exclusively used in his combative forms. In such multiple-armed images, Shiva may carry various attributes like the trishula, a damaru, sword, kapala, pasha, deer, ankusha (goad), vajra (thunderbolt), arrow, gada (mace), khatavanga, tanka (a chisel-like weapon), bow, snake, the elephant's tusk and akshamala. His hands may be held in suchihasta mudra (gesture to draw or point out attention) or vismaya mudra. At least, two arms hold the elephant skin around the body.

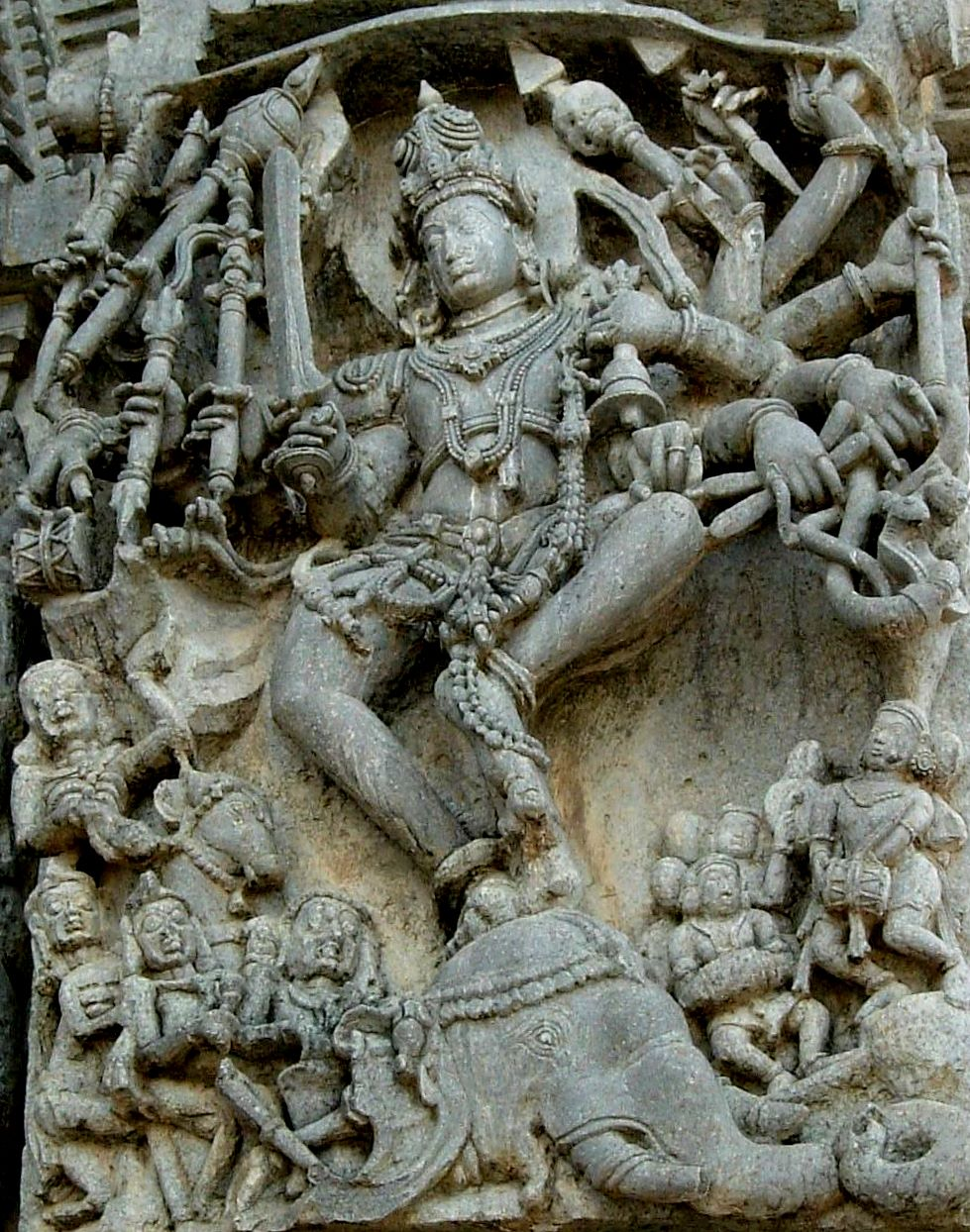
Gajasurasamhara, Belur, Karnataka

Gajasurasamhara is shown wearing a jatamukuta (matted hair crown), with a jatamandala (braided hair spreading from the head, forming a circle around it) and garlands of skulls. The jatamukuta may be embedded with skulls and durddhura flowers, while the jatamandala may be adored by Shival's usual attributes such as a snake and the crescent moon. His face is fearsome with round rolling eyes and protruding fangs.

Pal describes Gajasurasamhara as "the most dynamic of all Śaiva (related to Shiva) themes as created by South Indian sculptors." The body of Shiva is often emphasized in this posture to convey vigorous dance. In images from Karnataka, Shiva's right leg is on the elephant head and the left leg slightly lifted above to suggest dancing. In Chola sculptures as in the Valuvur and Darasuram images, the right leg often rests on the elephant's head and left leg is bent and raised above the right thigh (utkutikasana posture). In both configurations, the description in iconographical treatises where the left leg rests on the elephant's head is ignored.

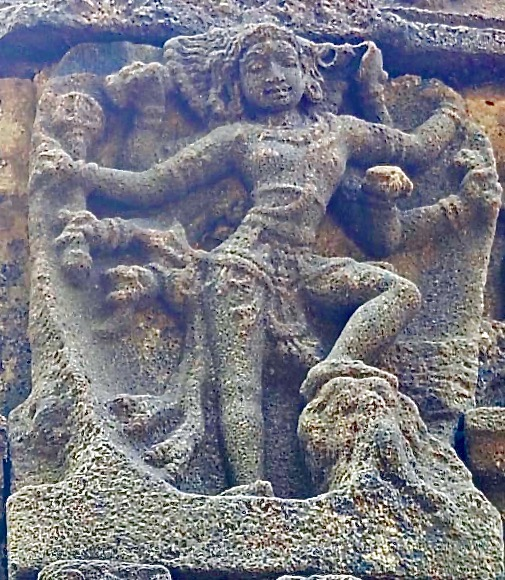
Gajasurasamhara Moorthi at the Thiruvaleeswaram Temple Vimanam, Tamil Nadu.

Gajasurasamhara is often depicted with Parvati by his side. She is often with a terrorized Skanda, looking at Shiva in fear and tightly clinging to her. Deviating from iconographical treatises in which both of them are described as terrified, some images depict a calm Parvati, reassuring her frightened son, symbolized by the abhayamudra ("fear-not") gesture made by her hand. In other portrayals, Gajasurasamhara is accompanied with Parvati, their son Ganesha, attendant ganas like Nandi and Bhringi, various deities and musicians playing musical instruments and skeletal goblin attendants.
