= K. J. Sarasa =

Indian Bharatanatyam exponent

- Born: 10 March 1937; Karaikal, Pondicherry, French colonial empire
- Died: 2 January 2012 (aged 74); Chennai, Tamil Nadu, India
- Occupations: Dancer, Dance Teacher
- Known for: Bharatanatyam
- Awards: Sangeet Natak Akademi Award; Kalaimamani

K. J. Sarasa was a Bharatanatyam exponent and teacher from Karaikal, Puducherry, India. She is often referred as the first female Nattuvanar (traditional teacher in Bharathanatyam). She received several awards including the Tamil Nadu State Kalaimamani Award and the Sangeet Natak Akademi Award.

== Biography ==
K. J. Sarasa was born to nagaswaram artist Jagadeesan Pillai and Valliammal on 10 March 1937 at Karaikal in present day Puducherry. She was born into the family of famous singer K. N. Dandayudhapani Pillai. Her father died when she was six years old. A native of Karaikal, she came under the tutelage of Vazhuvoor Ramaiah Pillai and moved to Madras with him when he moved to Madras. She trained in music, dance and nattuvangam (a traditional South Indian percussion instrument) under him for over 15 years.

Sarasa died on 2 January 2012.

== Career ==
In Bharathanatyam, Sarasa is a follower of Vazhuvoor bani style. She produced and choreographed more than 50 dance dramas (natya natakam).

Becoming Nattuvanar to Vyjayanthimala, in Karaikudi in 1952, she became the first female Nattuvanar (traditional teacher in Bharathanatyam).

In 1960 she founded the dance institute 'Sarasalaya'. Through this institute she had conducted more than 1,000 arangetrams (first public performance) and 2,000 dance performances. Former Tamil Nadu Chief Minister J. Jayalalithaa, actor Kamal Haasan, actress Shobana and Swarnamalya, choreographer Raghuram, and film director K. Subrahmanyam were among her disciples.

== Awards and honors ==
She has received the Tamil Nadu State Kalaimamani Award and the Sangeet Natak Akademi Award. Two of her dance productions, Shakuntalam and Vikramorvasiyam won the Swarna Kamal award at the Kalidas Samaroh in Ujjain.

As a mark of respect for her, Sarasa was appointed as the honorary director of the Bharatanatyam department of the Tamil Nadu Government Music College.
