= Veerateeswarar Temple, Vazhuvur =

Veerateeswarar temple
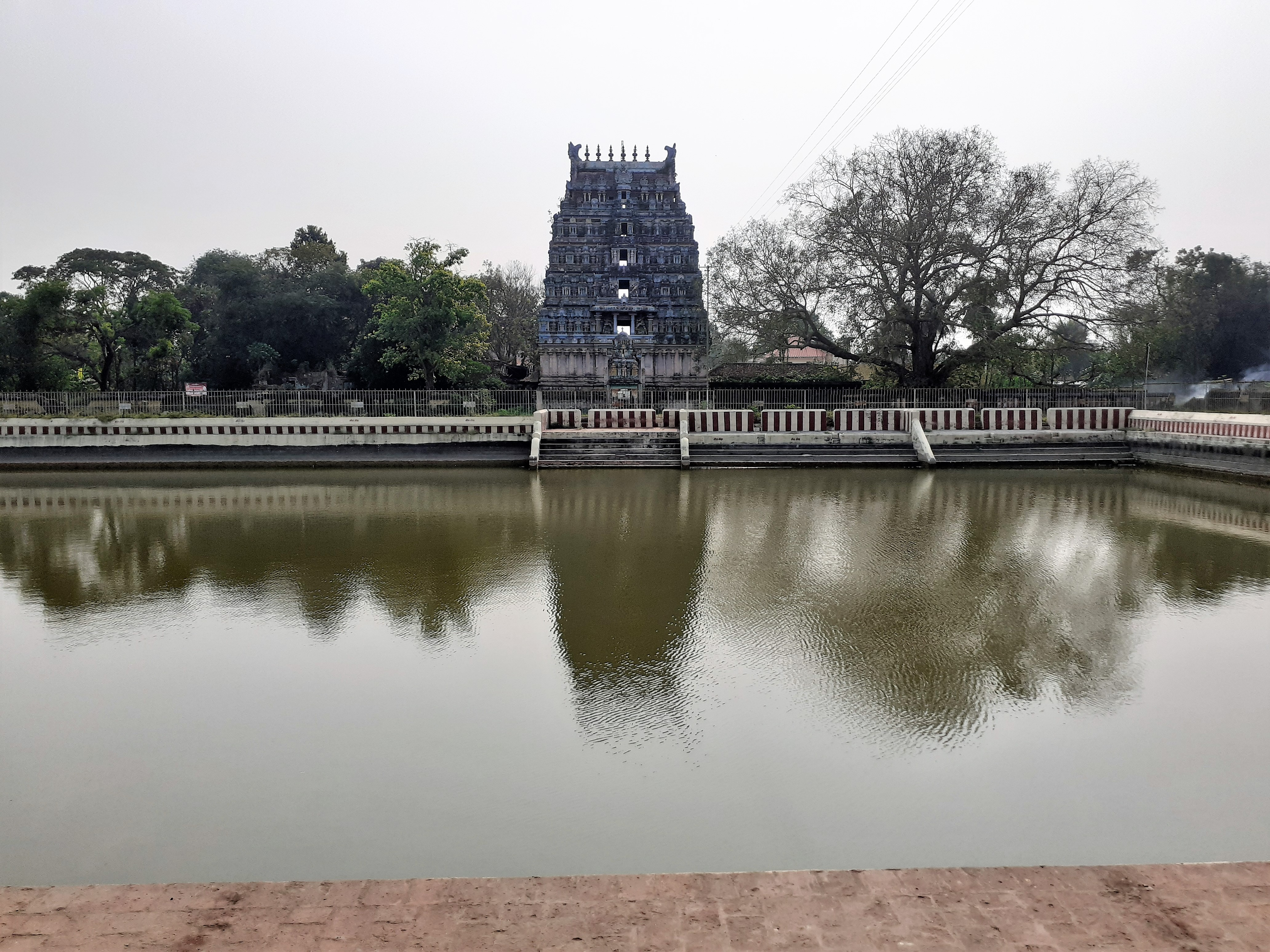

- Location within Tamil Nadu

Religion
- Affiliation: Hinduism
- District: Mayiladuthurai
- Deity: Shiva (Siva) as Gajasamhara - Viratteswara or Kirthivasa

Location
- Location: Vazhuvur near Mayiladuthurai
- State: Tamil Nadu
- Country: India
- Coordinates: 11.04501°N 79.6378°E

Architecture
- Type: Dravidian architecture

Veerateeswarar Temple (also called Vazhuvur Veerateeswarar temple) is a Hindu temple located at Vazhuvur in Mayiladuthurai district of Tamil Nadu, India. The presiding deity is Shiva in the form of Veerateswarar and his consort is known as Bala Gujambigai. The village is mentioned in the 7th century Tamil Saiva canonical work, the Tevaram, written by Tamil saint poets known as the nayanars and classified as Vaippu Sthalam, the 276 temples that find mention in it.

As per Hindu legend, Shiva is believed to have destroyed eight different demons and the eight Ashta Veeratanam temples are built signifying each of his victories. The temple is counted one of the eight where Shiva is believed to have punished the elephant taking the form of Gajasamhara.

The temple has four daily rituals at various times from 6:30 a.m. to 8:30 p.m., and few yearly festivals on its calendar. The present masonry structure was built during the Chola dynasty during the 9th century, while later expansions are attributed to Thanjavur Nayaks. The temple is maintained and administered by the Dharmapuram Aadhenam.

== Legend ==
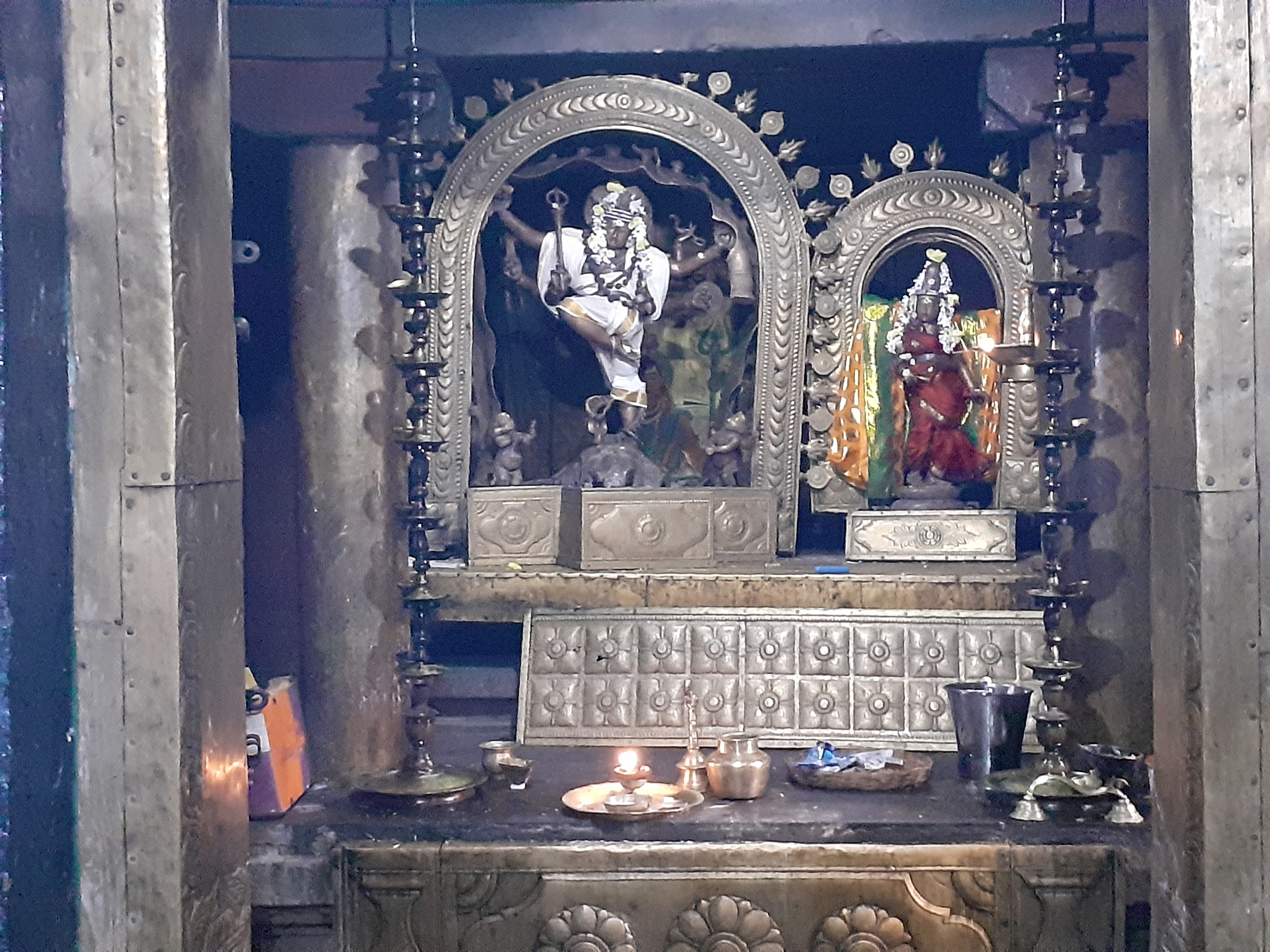
Gajasamhara Murthy temple

According to Hindu mythology, once, some sages doubting the omnipotence of the god Shiva created an elephant and challenged the god to a duel. Shiva took the form of Gajasamharamurti or "slayer of the elephant" and killed the elephant and wore its skin as a garment. As per another version, the sages residing in Tharukavana wanted Shiva to repent for his act of coming as Bhikshatana and inducing their wives to get them into conjugal mood. They created an elephant to fight against Shiva. Shiva tore open the elephant, whose skin started burning. The elephant fell in the Panchamuga tank opposite to the temple. Shiva is believed to have dipped in the northeast part of the tank and emerged from the southwest part of the tank. The aspect of Shiva is also known as "Kirthivasa" or "one who wears an elephant skin as garment". Vazhuvur is also one of the places where Siva danced his cosmic dance to crush the demon of ignorance. Since the demon Taraka inhabited this place, the forest is named Tharuka Vanam (the forest of Taruka). The place has other names like Parakayilayam, Gananbumi, Suyathapuri and Piplaraynam. During the great deluge, the village alone was not affected, leading to the Tamil name of Vazhuvur (the place which is not affected).

== Architecture ==
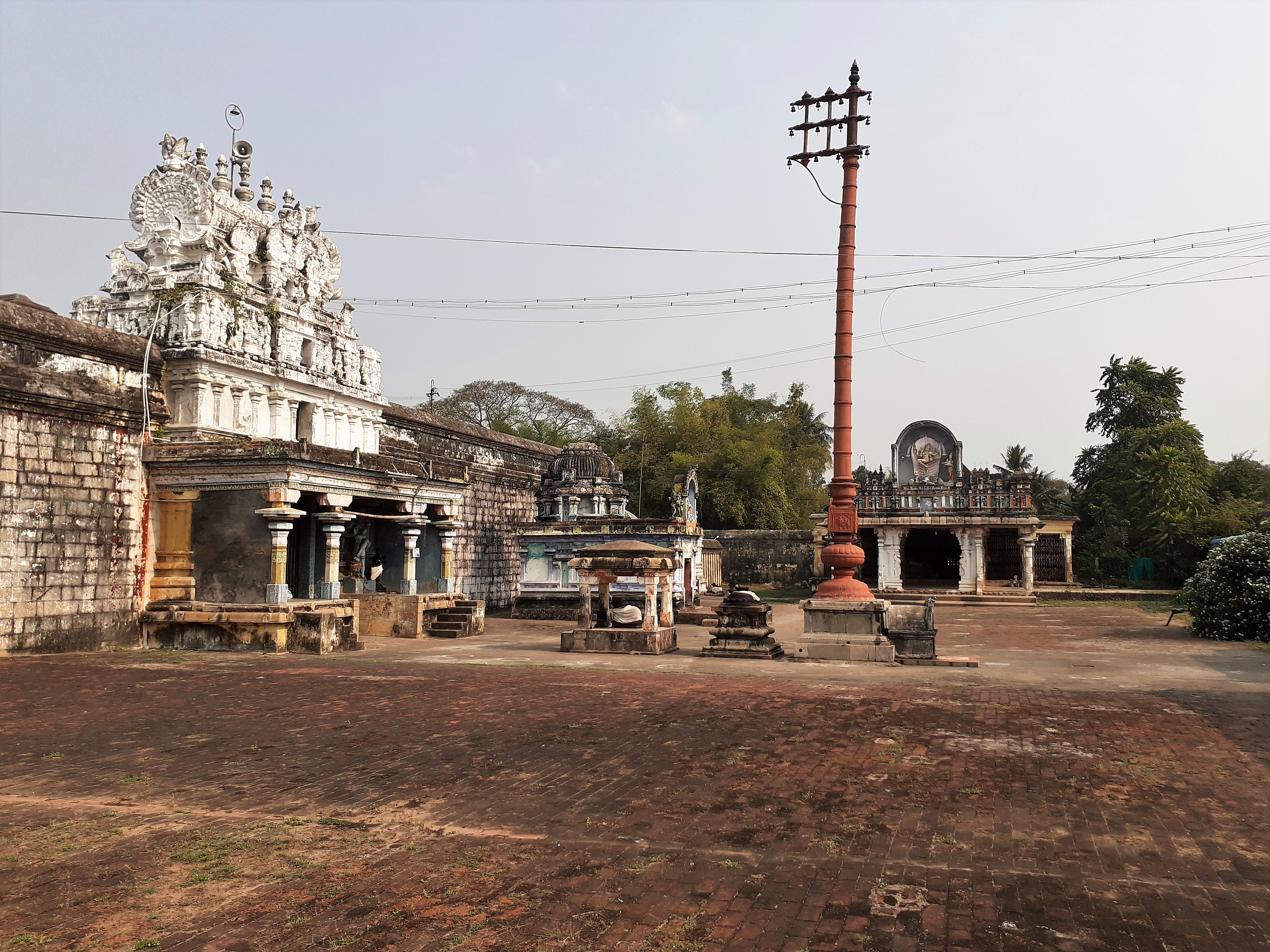
The view of the temple from outside

The temple is located in Vazhuvur, a village 2 km (1.2 mi) away from manganallur in Mayiladuthurai - Thiruvarur road. The temple faces the East and has a five-tiered rajagopuram. The temple tank, the Panchamuga Theertham is located outside the main entrance. The sanctum houses the image of Veeratneeswarar in the form of lingam. The sanctum has ardhamandapa before it and a Mahamandapa, the worship hall. The Mahamandapa houses the metal image of Gajasamharamurthy sported with six hands holding six different weapons and shown emanating out of elephant with elephant skin at his foot. The image is in the form of Om. The Mahamandapam also houses other metal images of Murugan, Somaskanda and Vinayagar. The shrine of Ambal in the form of Gnangmigai faces South. The image is sported in standing posture with four hands. The temple has two precincts and all the shrines in the temple are enshrined in rectangular granite walls. The temple has other important sculptures in the panels around the sanctum.

The temple dates from the time of the Medieval Cholas. The Gajasamharamurti idol was sculpted in the 11th century. The temple is built in the Dravidian style of architecture and is known for its exquisite bronze icons. Some of the popular bronze idols are those of Gajasamharamurti and Bhikshadana (Shiva as mendicant). Most of the inscriptions in the temple are dated from the period of Medieval Cholas from 1160 to 1276 CE. The image of Parvathi holding Murugan is a notable sculpture in the temple.

== Religious significance ==
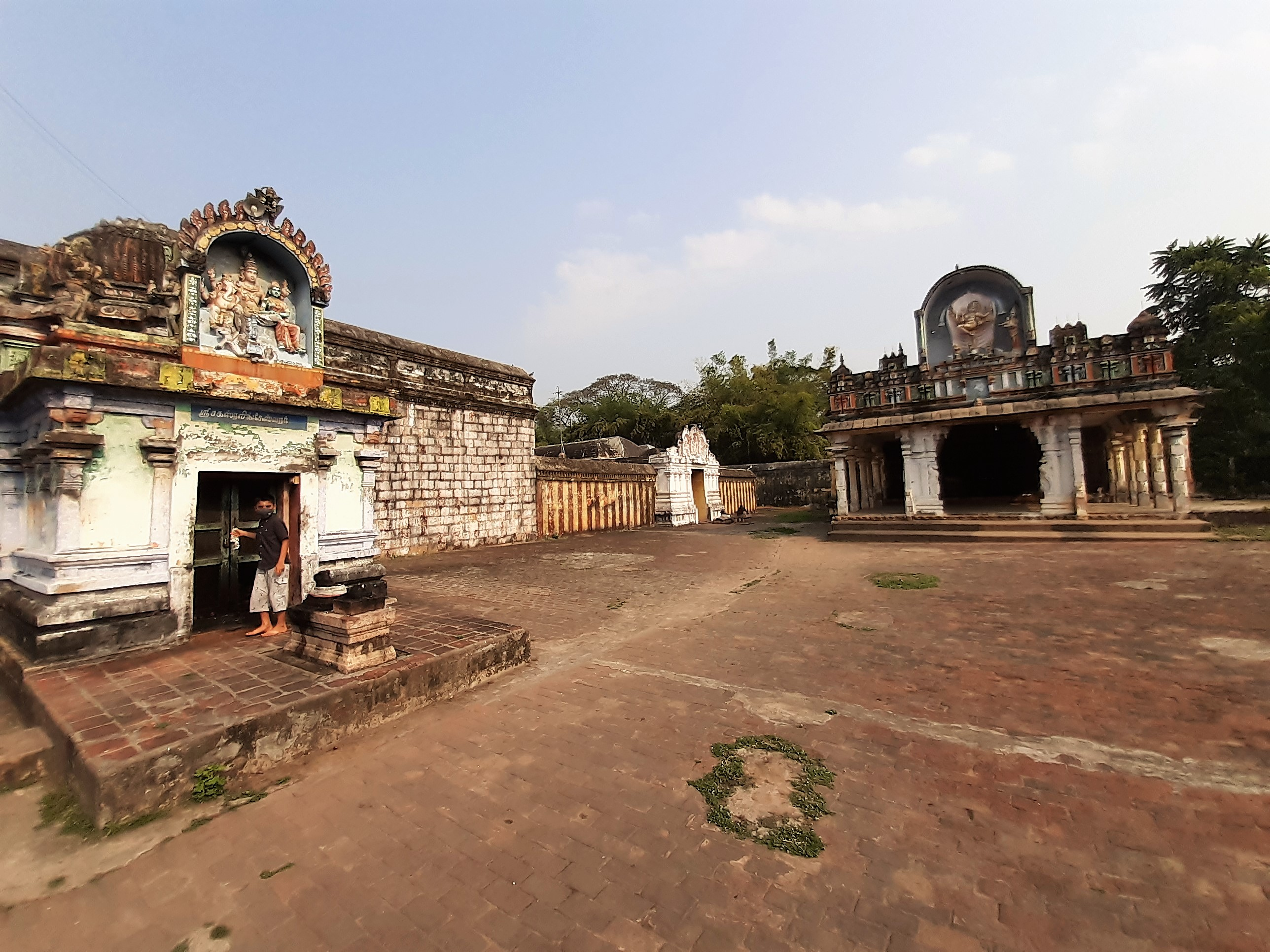
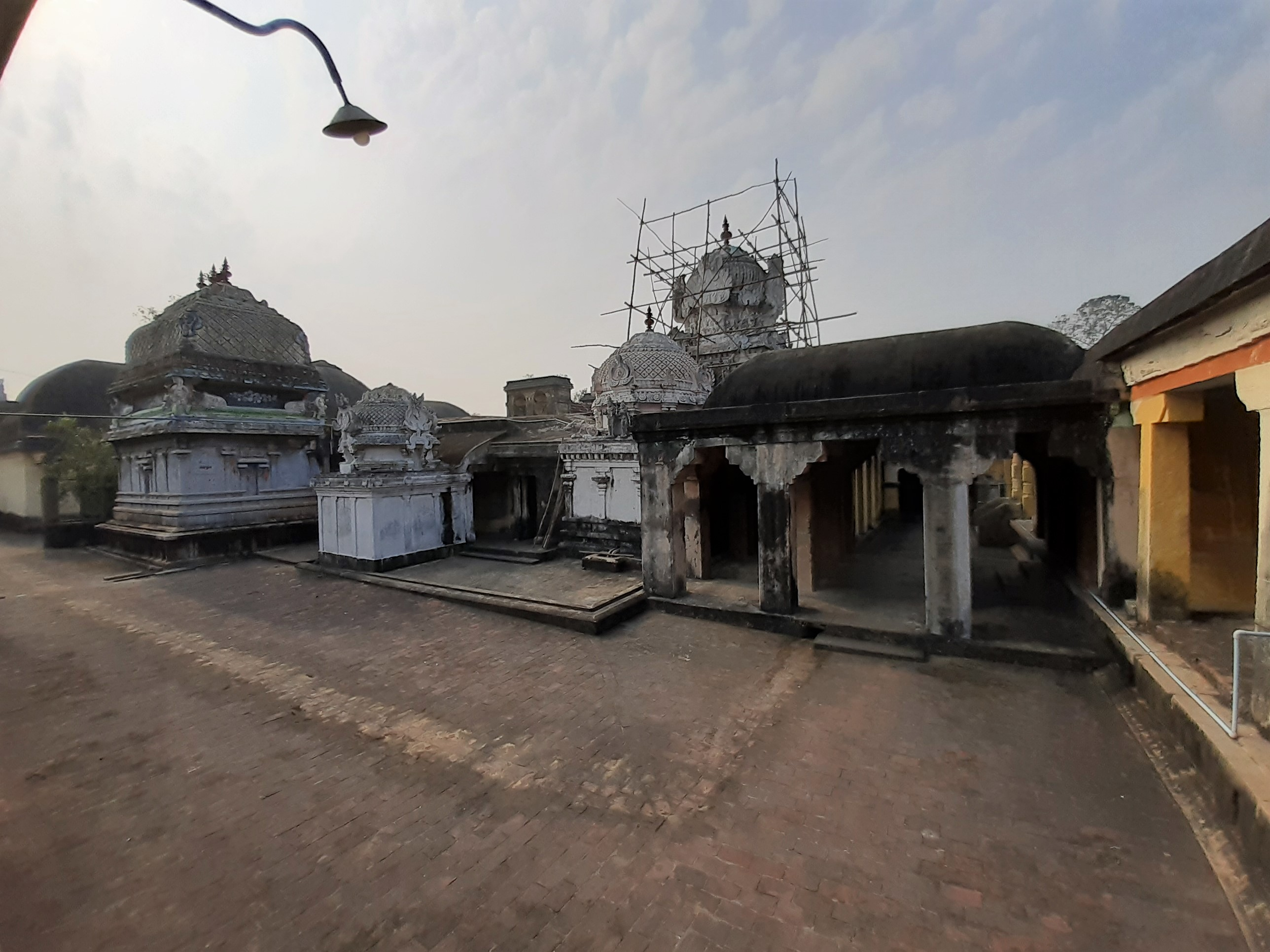
Pillared halls within the temple

As per Hindu legend, Shiva is believed to have destroyed eight different demons namely Andakasuran, Gajasuran, Jalandasuran, Thirupuradhi, Kaman, Arjunan, Dakshan and Taaragasuran. There are Ashta Veeratanam temples built signifying each of his victories in the war, and also as places where he is believed to have performed with fury. The eight temples are: Tiruvadigai Veerattaaneswarar Temple at Thiruvadigai, Tirukkovilur Veerateshwarar Temple at Tirukoilur, Veerateswarar temple at Vazhuvur or Thirukkurukkai, Amirtagateswarar Temple at Thirukadaiyur, Vazhuvur Verateswarar Temple at Vazhuvoor, Keelaparasalur Veerateswarar Temple at Tirupariyalur, Kandeeswarar Temple at Thirukkandiyur and Tiruvirkudi Veerataneswarar Temple at Thiruvirkudi. Shiva in all these temples are described to have used bow and arrow, trident and spear. It is one of the shrines of the Vaippu Sthalams sung by Tamil Saivite Nayanar Appar.
