= Vazhuvoor Ramaiah Pillai =

Bharathanatyam teacher (1910–1991)

- Born: Bagyathammal Ramaiah Pillai; 1910; Vazhuvoor, Tamil Nadu, India
- Died: 1991 (aged 80–81)
- Occupation: Bharathanatyam choreographer
- Spouse: Gnanasoundiram
- Children: 6, including Manikka Vinayagam

Vazhuvoor Ramaiah Pillai (1910–1991) was an Indian Bharatanatyam dance teacher and choreographer.

== Early life ==
Vazhuvoor Bagyathammal Ramaiah Pillai was born in 1910 to Parthiban and Bagyathammal in Vazhuvoor. He learned the arts of Nattuvangam and Bharatanatyam from his maternal uncle Maanikka Nattuvanar.

== Career ==
He introduced innovative trials in Bharatanatyam. He advocated traditional vazhuvoor bani from his ancestors, dating to the days of the Chola dynasty. He popularized this bani around the globe, especially through his star disciple Kamala. He implemented Rama Natak Kiruti, Tyagaraya Swami Kiruti, Bharathiyar songs, Kutralak Kuravanji, Arunachala Kavi songs, and Oottukkadu Venkata Kavi songs through his teaching. During the time that the British had banned Bharathiyar's songs, Vazhuvoor made these songs performed by his students in stage plays, thereby encouraging the support of Indian Independence.

== Family ==
He married Gnanasoundiram (late). They had six children: daughter Jayalakshmi (late); son Natya Kala Samrat Vazhuvoor Samraj (late, a renowned dance master); son Manoharan (late); son Vazhuvoor.R.Gurunathan (late, banker/financial advisor); daughter Bagyalashmi (knowledgeable in classical dance); son Manikka Vinayagam (popular movie singer), in order of birth.

== Notable students ==
- Vyjayanthimala
- Lalitha-Padmini-Ragini
- Kumari Kamala
- Kumari Rhadha
- Radha Viswanathan
- E. V. Saroja
- K. J. Sarasa
- Rajasulochana
- Rita
- Hemamalini Arni
- Padma Subrahmanyam
- Kanaka Srinivasan
- Chitra Visweswaran
- M. Bhanumathi
- Amala Shankar
- Padmini Ramachandran
- Raghuram Sundaram, Sunitha (Kodaimazha vidya)

== Awards ==
The following are the awards received by Vazhuvoorar:

- Isai Perarignar, 1961; given by Tamil Isai Sangam at Chennai
- Sangeet Natak Akademi Award, 1966
- Sangeetha Kalasikhamani, 1979
- Padmasri
- Kalaimamani
- Naatya Kala Kesari

== See also ==
- Vazhuvoor style

== Sources ==
- Vazhuvoorar School of Classical Dance & Music
- Vazhuvoorar Classical Bharathanatya Arts Centre
- Descendant of an illustrious tradition
- Lion's lineage
- Thinakaran Yaazh Pongal Festival
- Reference about Poet Vali
- Shree Vazhuvoorar Classical Bharathanatya Art's Academy-REGD
