= Pradosha =

Bimonthly occasion in the Hindu calendar

Pradosha or Pradosham (Sanskrit: प्रदोष, romanized: Pradoṣa) is a bimonthly occasion on the trayodashi (thirteenth day) of every fortnight in the Hindu calendar. It is closely connected with the worship of the Hindu god Shiva.

== Etymology ==
Pradoṣa is a Sanskrit compound word formed from pra (before) and doṣa (darkness), literally meaning the first part of the night or twilight.

== Legend ==
According to the Skanda Purana, King Satyaratha of Vidarbha was slain in battle by enemy forces, forcing his pregnant queen to flee into the forest. After giving birth to a prince on the banks of a lake, the queen was killed by a crocodile. The orphaned prince was discovered by a Brahmin woman named Uma, who raised the prince alongside her own son in her village, sustaining them through bhiksha (alms). When Uma met Sage Shandilya, he revealed that the prince's adversity stemmed from his karma. In his previous birth, Satyaratha had interrupted his pradosha worship of Shiva to order an execution and dined without completing the ritual. To restore their fortune, Shandilya instructed them in the observance of the pradosha vrata (fasting vow), remarking that doing so blesses the observer with wealth, grain, family, and luck.

According to a regional legend associated with the Mahakaleshwar Temple of Ujjain, King Chandrasena was attacked by neighboring rulers on a Saturday on a trayodashi, called the Shani Pradosha. During the siege, a young boy named Shrikhar and a priest named Vridhi prayed to Shiva near the Kshipra River. Shiva manifested as a pillar of light to defeat the invaders and subsequently established himself in the city as a svayambhu (self-manifested) lingam.

== Observances ==
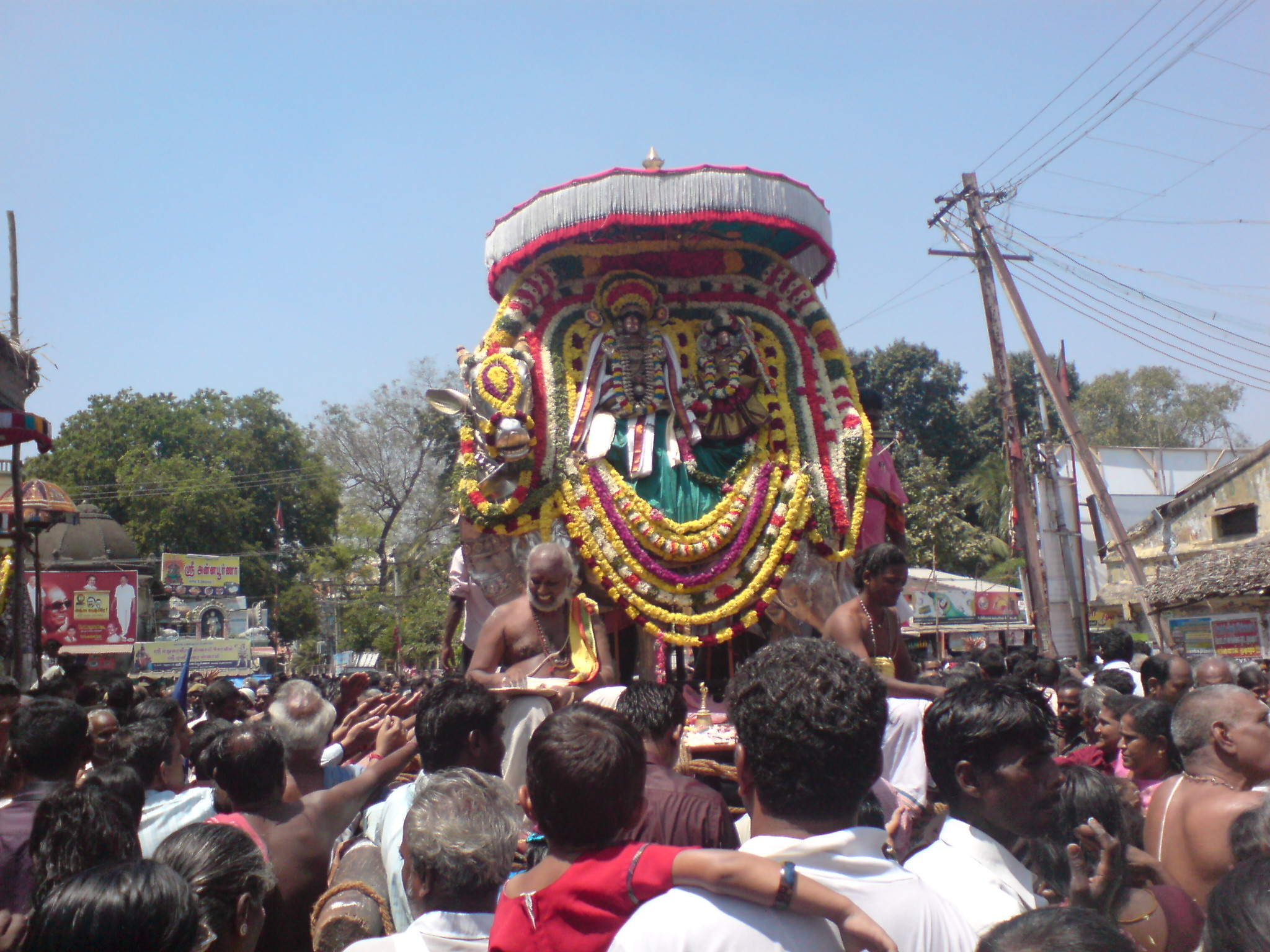
Processional images of Shiva and Parvati seated on Nandi

Worship is traditionally observed during a three-hour window, spanning 1.5 hours before and after sunset. The fasting vow performed during this period is called the pradosha vrata. The worship is conducted during sandhya kala (evening twilight). The vrata involves fasting followed by a vigil. Practitioners bathe an hour before sunset and wear rudraksha (sacred beads) and vibhuti (sacred ash).

Nandi, the bull-mount of Shiva, is worshipped across Shiva temples in South India. The festival idol of Shiva with his consort Parvati in a seated pose on Nandi is taken in procession in the temple complex. Other observances include worshipping the images of Shiva, Parvati, Ganesha, Kartikeya, and Nandi with an abhisheka (ritual bath), sandalwood paste, bael (wood apple) leaves, fragrance, deepas (lamps), and naivedya (food offerings). Following the formal worship and invocation of Shiva, the story of pradosha is recited.

== Types ==
Shani Pradosha is the pradosha falling on a Saturday, while Soma Pradosha is the pradosha on a Monday.

Maha Pradosha is the Pradosha which falls before or on Maha Shivaratri in the Hindu month of Maagha.
