= Veerateeswarar Temple, Thiruvathigai =

- வீரட்டானேசுவரர்
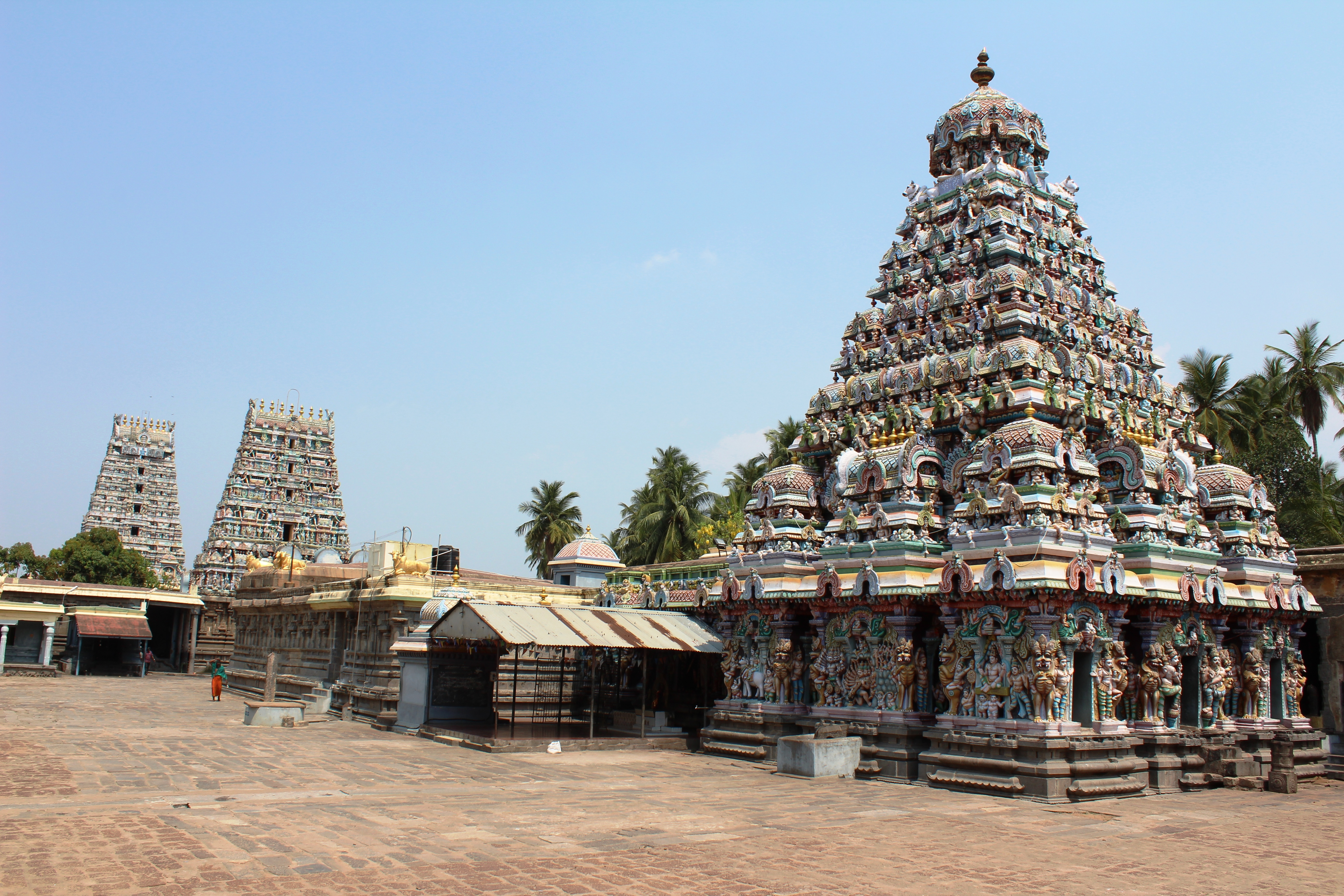

- Location in Tamil Nadu

Religion
- Affiliation: Hinduism
- District: Cuddalore
- Deity: Veerateswarar(Shiva)

Location
- Location: Panruti, Tamil Nadu, India
- State: Tamil Nadu
- Country: India
- Coordinates: 11.768217461275837°N 79.57513915459279°E

Architecture
- Type: Dravidian architecture
- Established: before 7th century CE

Thiruvathigai Veerateswarar Temple (also Virattaneshwara Temple, Tamil: வீரட்டானேசுவரர் ) is a Hindu temple dedicated to Shiva. It is situated in Thiruvathigai village which is about 2 kilometres east from the town of Panruti in the South Indian state of Tamil Nadu, India. Shiva is worshiped as Veerattaaneswarar, and is represented by the lingam. His consort Parvati is depicted as Thiripurasundari. The presiding deity is revered in the 7th-century-CE Tamil Saiva canonical work, the Tevaram, written by Tamil saint poets known as the nayanars and classified as Paadal Petra Sthalam. The temple is considered the place where the Saiva saint poet Appar (Thirunavukkarasar) converted back to Saivism, and attained final salvation.

The temple complex is one of the largest in the state and it houses two gateway towers known as gopurams. The temple has numerous shrines, with those of Veerateeswarar and Mookambigai being the most prominent. The temple complex houses many halls and three precincts. The temple has six daily rituals at various times from 5:30 a.m. to 10 p.m., and twelve yearly festivals on its calendar. The temple is maintained and administered by Thiruvaduthurai Adheenam, a South Indian monastic institution.

== Legend ==
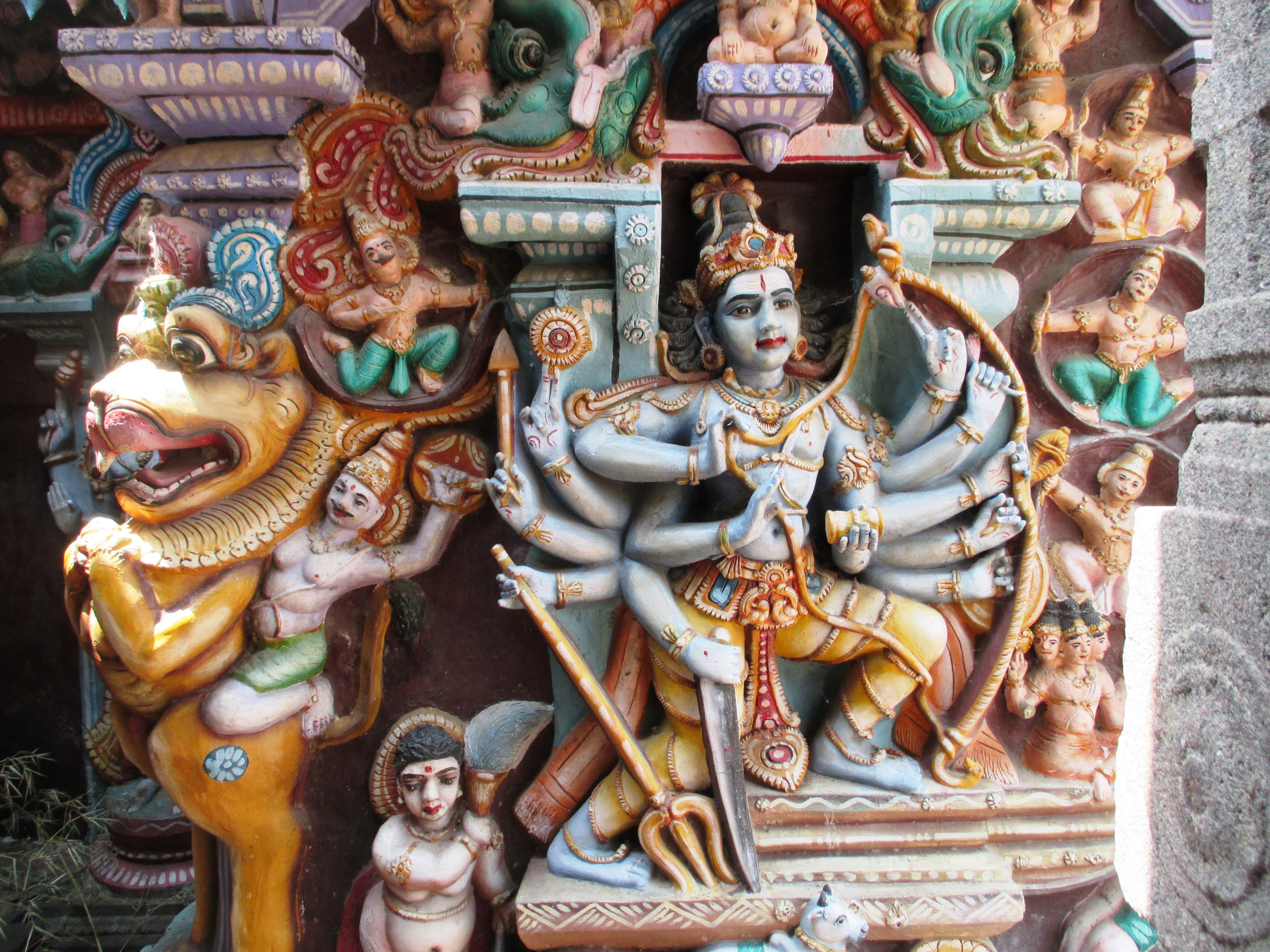
Legend of Shiva as Veerateeswarar (Tripurantaka)

Legend holds that this temple is the place where Shiva destroyed three rakshashas and the three cities created by them. Saranarayana Perumal, another name of Vishnu, is the one who gave the arrow to Shiva for killing the demons, whose temple is also located in the town, little easterly. The Shiva Purana details the legend of destruction of the demon Tripuran, who was ruling Tripura. The destruction is detailed as a cosmic event, which most attribute to the destruction of stars, meteors and unexplained material bodies. Tripuran attacked all the celestial deities who sought the help of Shiva to protect them. Shiva after a fiery fight, destroyed Tripuran and attained the name Tripurantaka. Shiva ashed down the city Tripura and dipped his three fingers in the ashes, which signifies the three lines of ash which is worn by all shaivites on their forehead.

As per another variant, the three sons of Taraka obtained boons from Brahma and built an impregnable fortress on earth. On account of their atrocious activities, mother earth prayed to Shiva for rescue. Shiva burnt down the fort and was about to attack the trio, but they begged for mercy. He made two of them as Dvarapalas and one as his damaru, which he sports in his right hand. The whole incident is believed to have taken place in Thiruvathigai on the banks of Kedilam. The original name of the place was called Tripura Dahanam, which went on to become Thiruvathigai. During Tripurasamharam, the killing of Tripurantaka, Shiva forgot to worship Ganesha before setting out for the battle. He realized it and came back to worship Ganesha and went ahead to win the demon. The same legend is associated with Aksheeswaraswamy Temple, Acharapakkam and Thiruvirkolam Sri Tripuranthaka Swami temple.

== History ==
The Pallava king Mahendravarman I converted from Jainism to Saivism under the influence of Appar. He is believed to have destroyed a Jain monastery and built a temple called Gunavareswaram close to the temple. Mahendra Pallava is believed to have attained the name Gunavareswara on account of the incident. A king called Kalinkaraya is believed to have endowed lot of treasures and built various structures in the temple as seen from the inscriptions in the temple. King Raja Raja Chola I is believed to have stayed in this temple for a long time to study the architecture before building Brihadeeswarar Temple. The temple is believed to have been expanded by later Pandyas. During the period of Thanjavur Marathas and British Colonization, the temple acted as a fort to the armies. The inscriptions indicate that the streets have to be cleaned before any temple procession with the likes of the streets in this village.

== Architecture ==
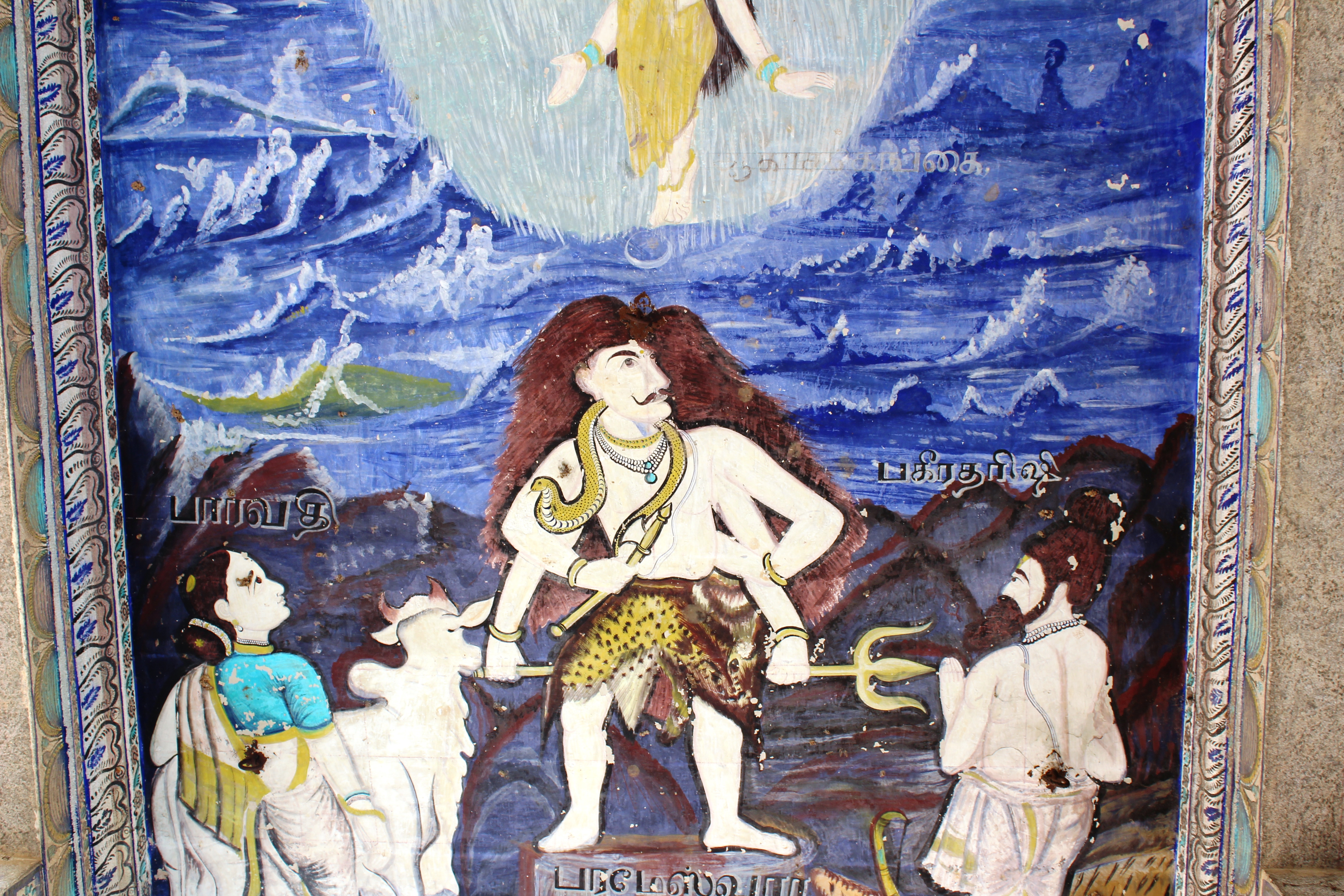
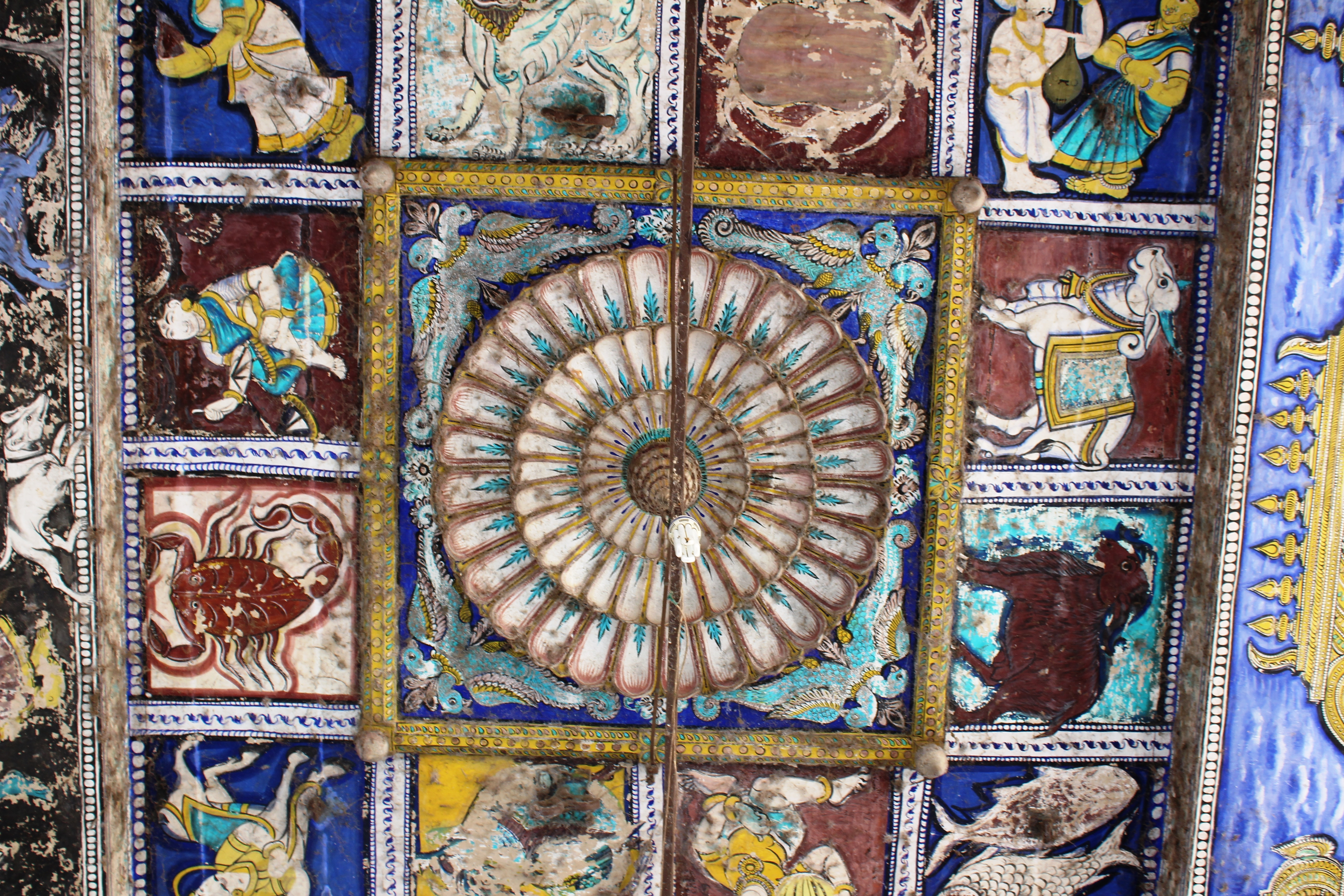
Paintings on the ceiling of the temple

The temple is located in Thiruvathigai, a village 2 km from Panruti in Cuddalore district. The temple covers an area of 7 acres (2.8 ha) with three precincts. The temple has a seven tiered gateway tower which has sculptures depicting 108 poses of Bharatanatyam. There is a sixteen pillared hall called Thiruneetru mandapam, which is believed to have constructed at the behest of Thilagavathiyar, the sister of Appar to commemorate his conversion to Shaivism. There is a temple tank named Chakrateertha kulam and a Vasantha mandapam on the northern portion of the tank. On the second precinct, there is a flag staff and a five tiered temple tower.

The sanctum is built on an elevated structure. There are shrines around the sanctum in the first precinct that has a shrine of Thilagavathiar and a pillared hall housing the sixty three Nayanar saints and the deities Shani (Saniswarar), Durga, Ganesha (Siddivinayagar), Kartikeya (Muruga), a set of Lingam, Nataraja and Surya. The shrine of Umayammai, the consort of the presiding deity, is present. The shrine houses the image of Lingam which is believed to have worshiped by Vishnu. There is a south facing shrine in the hall before the sanctum where the image of Tripurasamharamurthy with sixteen hands is housed. Sanctum houses the image of Veerataneswarar in the form of lingam. There is an image of Ammayapar housed in the sanctum. The shrine over the sanctum has a pyramidal roof with stucco images all through the filial at the top.

== Worship and festivals ==
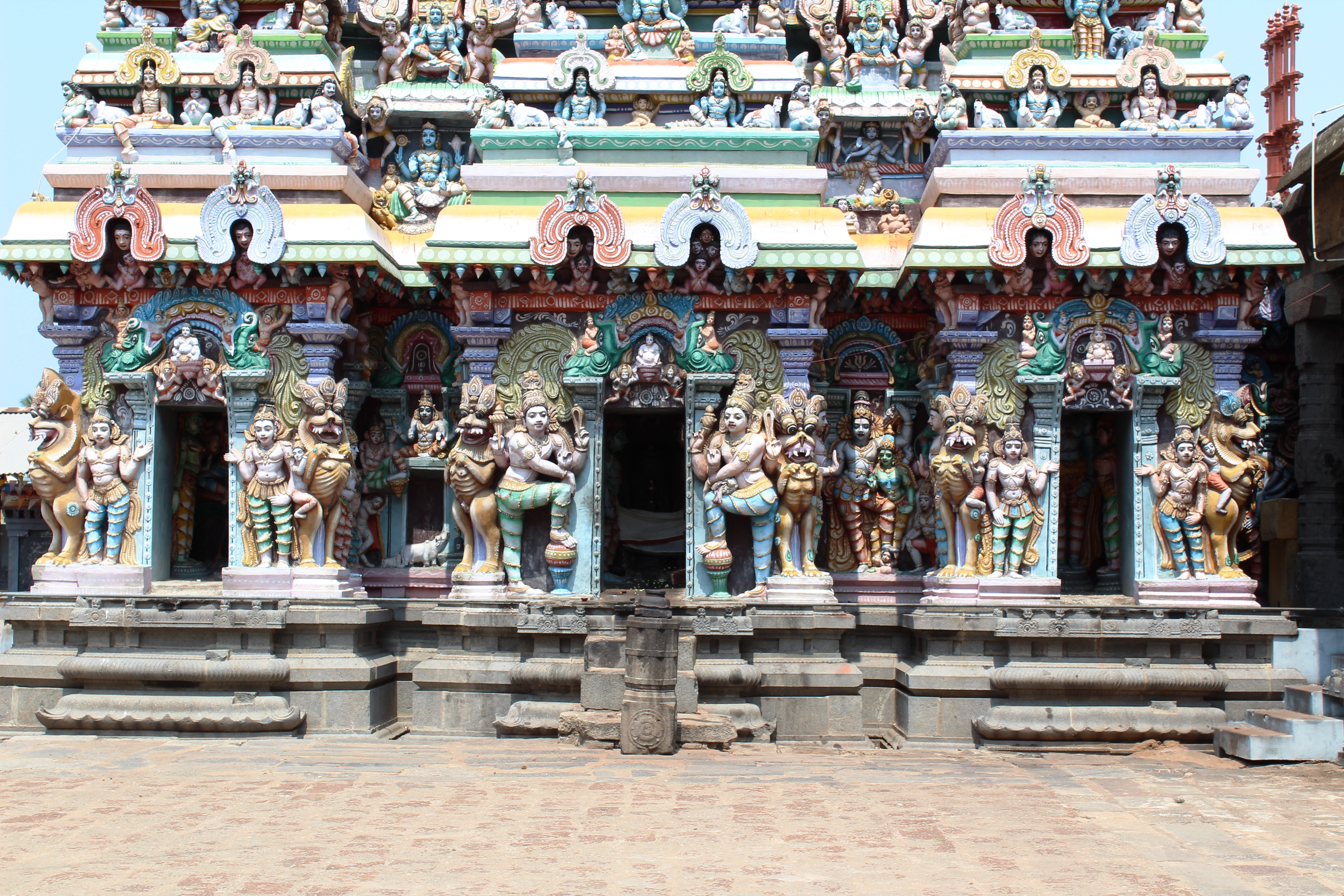
Stucco images on the vimanam

The temple priests perform the pooja (rituals) during festivals and on a daily basis. Like other Shiva temples of Tamil Nadu, the priests belong to the Shaivaite community, a Brahmin sub-caste. The temple rituals are performed six times a day; Ushathkalam at 6:00 a.m., Kalasanthi at 8:00 a.m., Uchikalam at 12:00 p.m., Sayarakshai at 6:00 p.m., Irandamkalam at 8:00 p.m. and Ardha Jamam at 9:00 p.m. Each ritual comprises four steps: abhisheka (sacred bath), alangaram (decoration), neivethanam (food offering) and deepa aradanai (waving of lamps) for both Veerateeswarar and Thiripurasundari. There are weekly rituals like somavaram and sukravaram, fortnightly rituals like pradosham and monthly festivals like amavasai (new moon day), kiruthigai, pournami (full moon day) and sathurthi. The most prominent festival of the temple, Vasantha Utsavam, is celebrated for ten days during the Tamil month of Chittirai. The festival deity of presiding deity and his consort circumambulate the temple and the streets in the village in different vehicles. Vaikasi Brahmotsavam during the Tamil month of Vaikasi (May - June) and the ten day Sadayam star festival associated with the day Appar got salvation are other important festivals of the temple.

== Religious significance ==
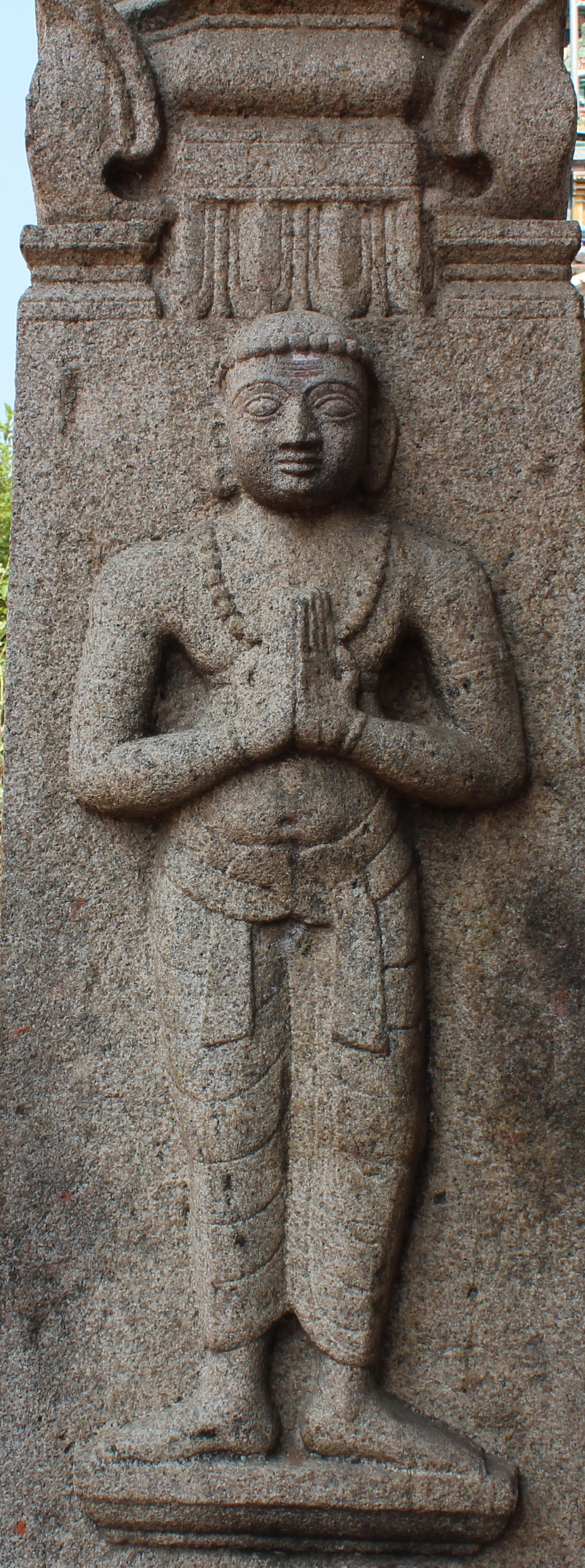
Image of Appar

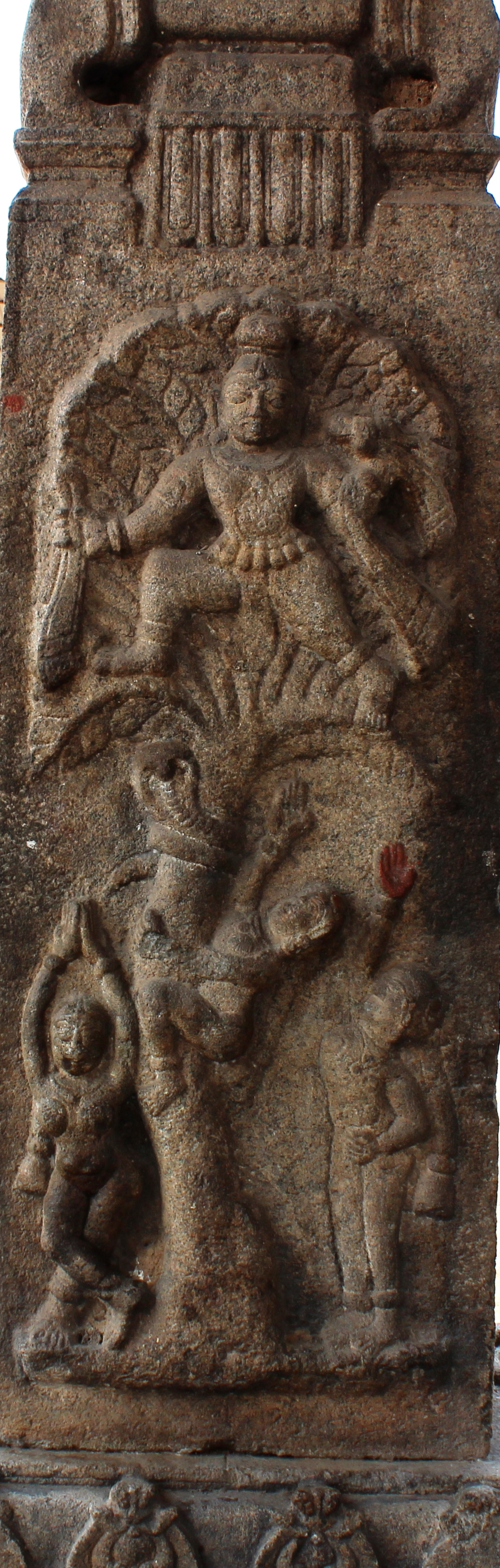
Sculpture representing a Hindu legend

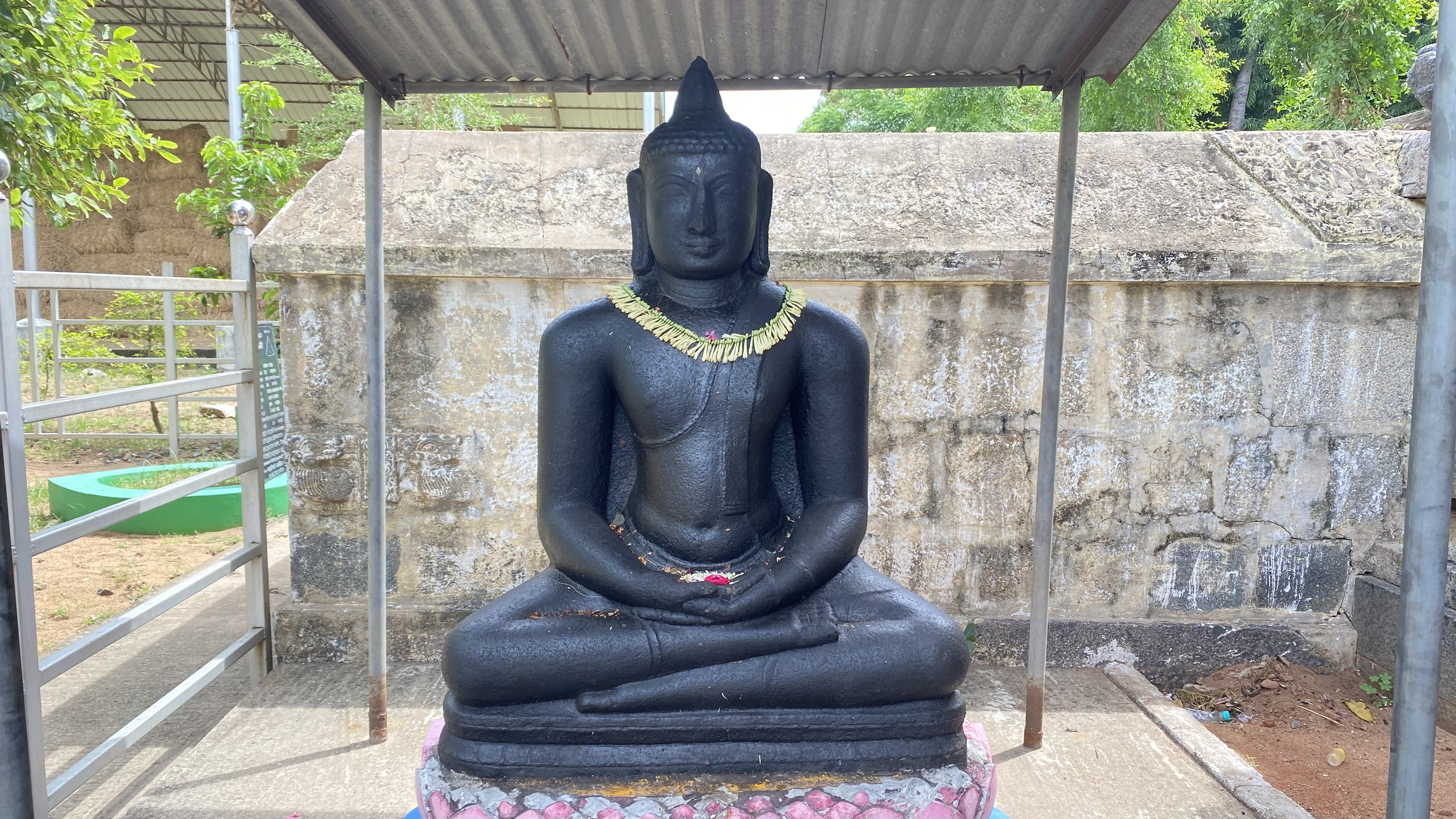
Statue of Buddha in the temple

The temple is one of the Ashta Veeratanam temples that commemorate Shiva's eight acts of valour and fury where he became victorious over demons, heroes or divinities.

Appar's sister Thilakavathiyar settled here during her later years and devoted her lifetime service to Shiva. Afflicted by a painful illness, Thirunavukkarasar, who was originally called Dharmasenar and was then a staunch follower of Jainism, prayed for relief at this temple where his sister Thilagavathiyar served. By the divine grace of Shiva, he was cured. He embraced Saivism from then and started canonizing various temples with his verses. The ruling Pallava king namely Kadava punished Thirunavukarasar in various ways and finally dropped him in a lime kiln. He was subsequently cast on the waters of sea, where he started floating and was pushed ashore in Thirupathipuliyur. It is believed that some of his best songs were sung at this time in praise of the presiding deities at Padaleeswarar temple and Veerateneeswarar temple. Thirunavukkarasar came back to Thiruvathigai from Thirupathripuliyur. Influenced by the greatness of the poet, the king himself converted to Shaivism from Hinduism. Appar venerated Veerateeswarar in seventeen verses in Tevaram, compiled as the Fourth Tirumurai, Fifth Tirumurai and Sixth Tirumurai. The Soolai Kinaru, a well in the temple is believed to be the limestone well where Appar was dropped by the Jains. Though the actual location was in Cuddalore, the well is maintained as an indicative example of the event. The water from the well is taken by people suffering from stomach related ailments.

Tirugnana Sambandar, a 7th-century Tamil Saivite poet and a contemporary of Appar, venerated Veerateeswarar in 46 verses in Tevaram, compiled as the First Tirumurai. According to the Hindu legend Sambanthar had a vision of cosmic dance of Shiva at this place. As per another legend, Sundarar, another saint poet, did not enter the temple as it was already praised by Appar. He was sleeping outside the temple where an old man stepped on his head. Sundarar avoided him and turned his head toward other direction, but the old man still stepped on his head. Sundarar wanted to know who the old man was when Shiva appeared in his true form in front of him. The temple called Siddapureeswarar near Panruti is associated with the legend. Sundarar also venerated Veerateeswarar in one verse in Tevaram, compiled as the Seventh Tirumurai. As the temple is revered in Tevaram, it is classified as Paadal Petra Sthalam, one of the 275 temples that find mention in the Saiva canon.

== See also ==
- The Buddha in Hinduism
