= Somaskanda =

Representation of Shiva, Parvati, and Skanda

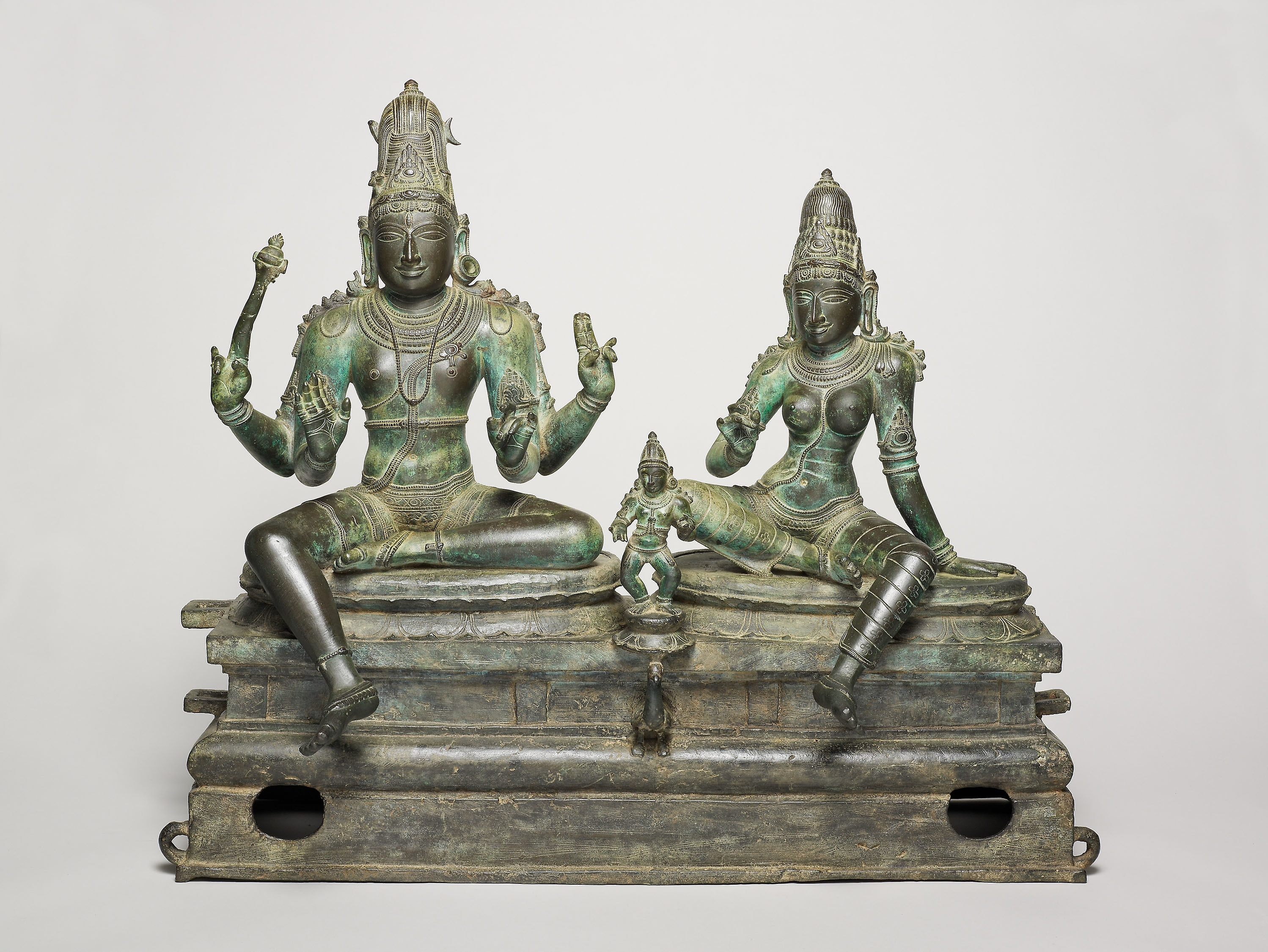
A depiction of Somaskanda with a dancing Skanda in the middle of Parvati and Shiva .

Somaskanda (Sanskrit: सोमास्कन्द, romanized: Somāskanda) is a medieval form of Hindu iconography, a representation of Shiva with his consort Uma (Parvati), and their son Skanda (Murugan), depicted as a child.

== Description ==
This family depiction of Shiva originated during the 6th-8th centuries CE during the period of the Pallava in South India. The representation shows Shiva with four arms and Uma (Parvati), and between them the infant Skanda (Murugan) is shown as dancing with ecstasy. Over a period of time, a number of such depictions have been discovered from different regions that were once under the control of Pallavas. The representation is regarded to be a product of syncretism, combining the Puranic Shiva, and the folk deities of Korravai, identified with Parvati, and Murugan, identified with Skanda.

== Iconography ==
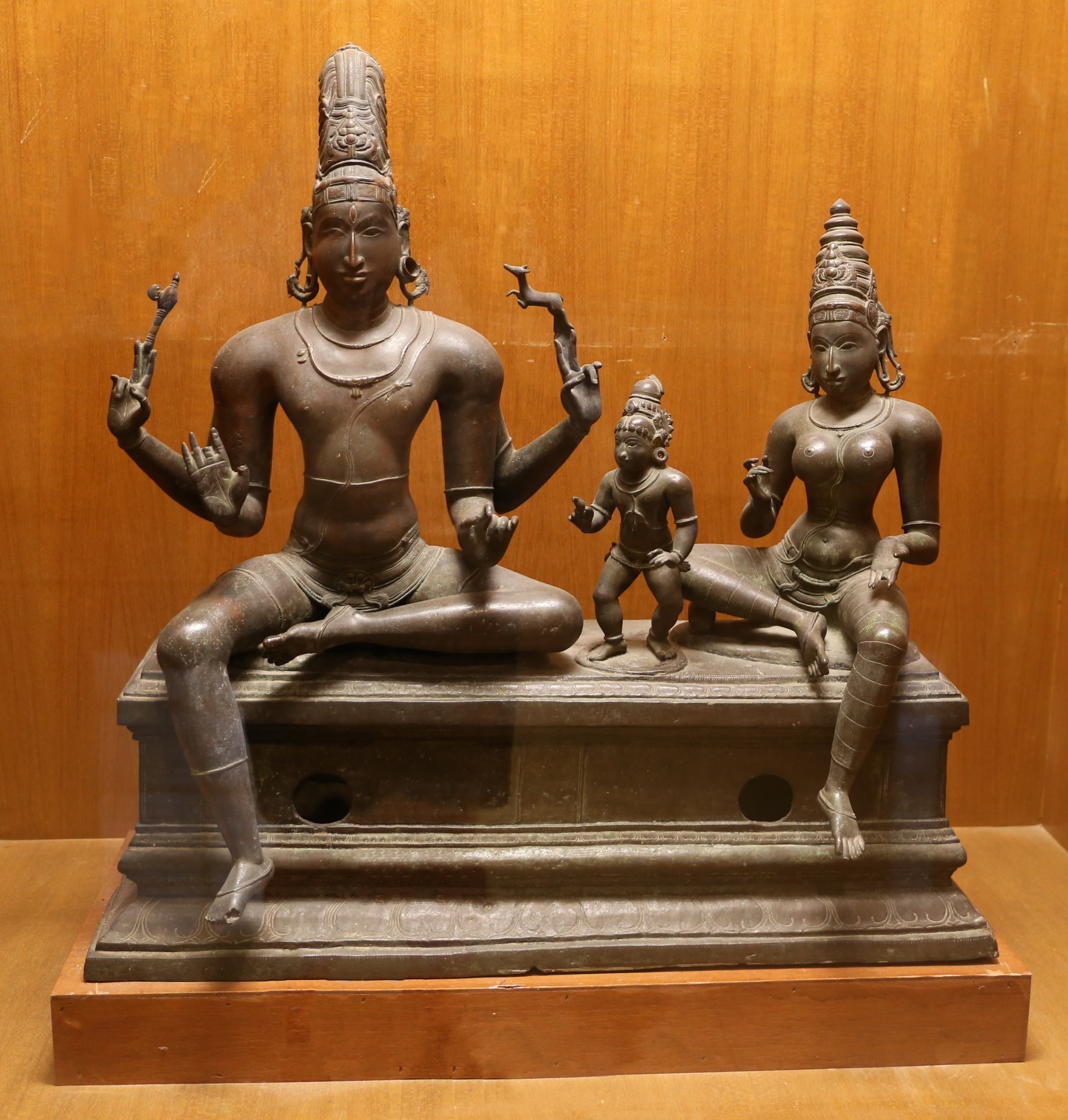
Somaskanda, Salar Jung Museum

In the Somaskanda representation, Shiva is seated in the sukhasana pose, with his left leg folded and depicted with four hands. His upper two hands perform the kartarimukha-hasta, holding a Mazhu (மழு) (Axe) in the right, and a deer in the left. His lower right hand performs the pataka-hasta and his lower left hand performs the kapittha. His consort, Parvati, is portrayed seated in a sukhasana pose, with her right leg folded and her left leg stretched. She is represented with two hands performing the kapittha-hasta. Their son, Skanda, is portrayed in their midst, performing the araimandi pose, or standing in vaitastika-sthanaka with his knees slightly bent. Both of his hands perform the kartarimukha, holding shakti in his right hand and a vajra in his left hand.

== See also ==
- Kalyanasundara
- Lakshmi Narayana
- Ravananugraha

== General and cited references ==
- Dallapiccola, Anna L. (2002). Dictionary of Hindu Lord and Legend. New York: Thames & Hudson. ISBN 0-500-51088-1. OCLC 51509850.
