= Vazhuvur =

Dance style in Bharatanatyam

Vazhuvur (or Vizhuvur) is one style of Bharatanatyam, an Indian classical dance.

Distinctive features include:

- rich sringar elements
- wide range of dancing pace
- softer facial abhinaya
- extremely elaborate movements
- deep sitting positions
- variety of positions on the floor

In the older, Pandanallur style pani, abhinaya is more ritualistic (i.e. in conformity with the rules as set by the ancient texts) than realistic, so the spectators are supposed know the rules to appreciate it. The Vazhuvur pani evolved later than the Pandanallur, and while this did not deviate from the rules of the performing arts treatise Natya Shastra, it adopted the abhinayas that were relatively more realistic. However, some contemporary Bharatanatyam dancers, such as seen in the external link below, have created several transitional sub-styles. This style of Bharatanatyam was made famous and was introduced by Vazhuvoor Ramaiah Pillai and his ancestors.

More distinct characteristics include:

- performance begins with a Thodaya mangalam in praise of Lord Gnana Sabesar of Vazhuvoor
- the dancer starts the performance while entering the stage from the wings
- static postures are performed, most often in the tillana, to break the monotony and to add the variety of rhythms
- the jatis, or distinct segments of choreography, have more korvais (intervals), which creates a suspense effect
- the dancer's torso from the waist up is slightly bent forward
- the adavus flow smoothly, with rare abrupt movements
- beautiful leaps are introduced into every jati
- abhinaya is subtle with more natyadharmi (spontaneous expressions), so the presentation is not "overdone"
- lasya dominates tandava
