= Vishvaksena =

Commander-in-chief of the army of the Hindu god Vishnu

- Commander of Vishnu's Armies
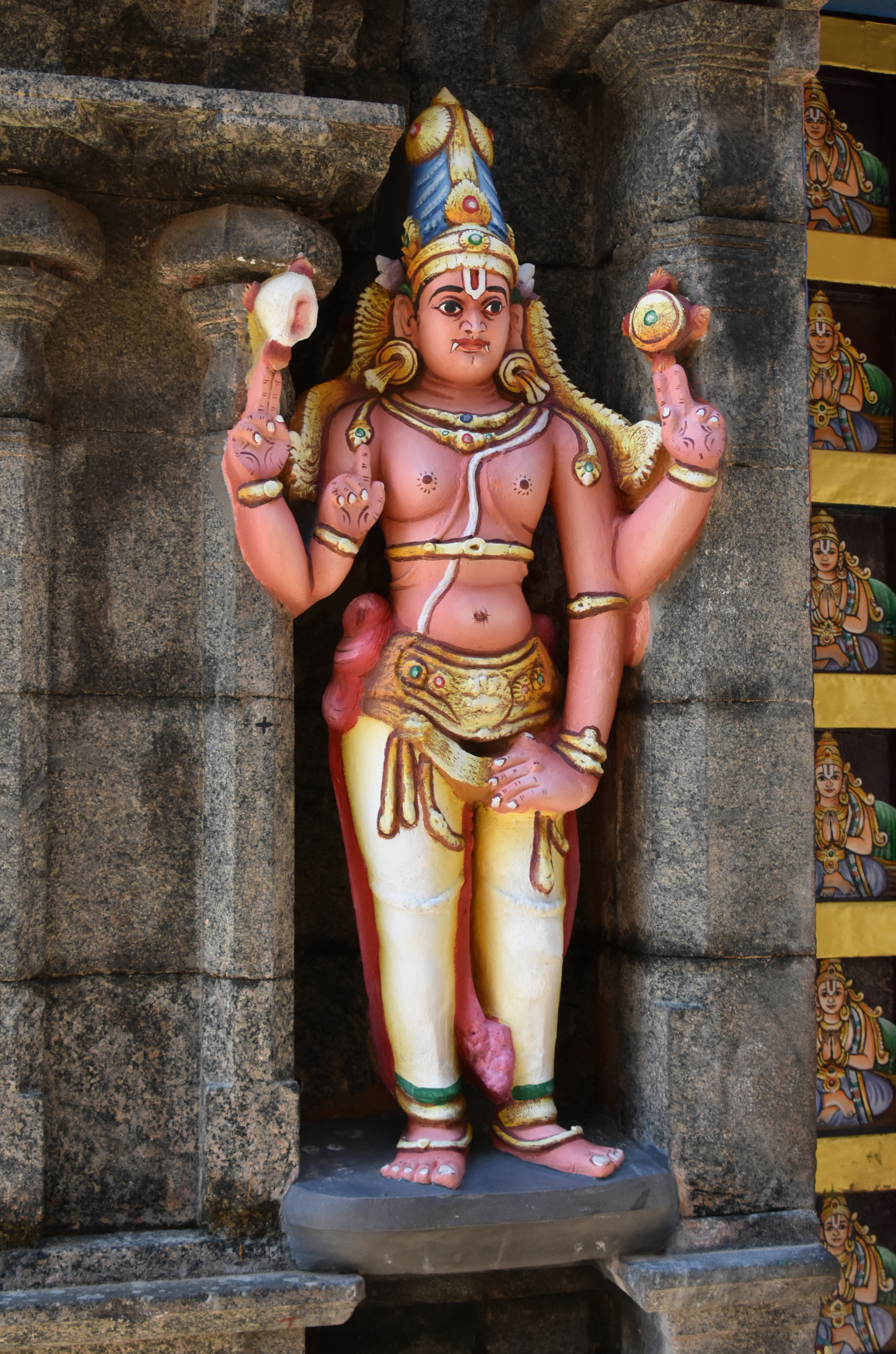
- Vishvaksena, depicted as a dvarapala (gatekeeper) at Srirangam
- Other names: Senai Mudalavar, Senathipati
- Venerated in: Vaishnavism
- Abode: Vaikuntha

Genealogy
- Spouse: Sutravati

Vishvaksena (Sanskrit: विष्वक्सेन, romanized: Viṣvaksenā, lit. 'all-conqueror') or Vishwaksena is the commander-in-chief of the army of the Hindu deity Vishnu, and acts as a gatekeeper and guardian of his celestial abode (realm) of Vaikuntha. As the embodiment of the tantras, Vishvaksena is worshipped prior to any rituals and ceremonies in the Vaikhanasa and Sri Vaishnava traditions. In Vaikhanasa and Pancharatra temple traditions, major festivals typically begin with his worship and procession.

== Iconography and associations ==
धर्मः स्वनुष्ठितः पुंसां विष्वक्सेनकथासु यः । नोत्पादयेद्यदि रतिं श्रम एव हि केवलम् ॥८॥

— Vyasa, Srimad Bhagavatam, Book I, Chapter II

The name is derived from Vishva, meaning the universe, and Sena, meaning army; the name refers to one whose forces extend throughout the universe.

The Kurma Purana describes Vishvaksena as born from a portion of Vishnu, wearing yellow clothes like his master and holding a conch (shankha), discus (chakra) and mace (gada). The Kalika Purana describes him as a four-armed attendant of Vishnu with a reddish-brown complexion, a long beard, and matted hair. Seated on a white lotus, he holds a lotus bud, mace (gada), conch (shanka), and discus (chakra).

The Pancharatra text Lakshmi Tantra depicts Vishvaksena with four arms, holding a shankha and a lotus. Elsewhere in the text, he is described as having four teeth, tawny eyes, beard, and eyebrows, wearing yellow garment while holding a sword and a club. Another hymn states that Vishvaksena bears the attributes of Vishnu, including the srivatsa mark and his weapons. The Vishvaksena icon at the Tirumala Venkateswara Temple has four arms, holding a conch, discus in its upper hands, while the lower hands display the Gada hasta (hands on thigh) and Ahvana hasta (invitation gesture) positions.

In the Madhva tradition of Vaishnavism, Vishvaksena is regarded as the son of Vayu (Mukhyapraana).

== Literature ==
The Brihad Bhagavatamrita describes Vishvaksena in service to Vishnu at Vaikuntha:

Śeṣa, Suparṇa (Garuḍa), Viṣvaksena, and other principal attendants were standing in front of the Lord. With bowed heads and hands folded in devotion, they were glorifying the Lord with most wonderful prayers.

— Brihad Bhagavatamrita

The Garga Samhita states that Vishvaksena guards the northern gate of Vaikuntha day and night.

Vishvaksena does not appear in the Vedas or the Dharma Shastra texts, but his worship is prescribed in Pancharatra and other Agama literature. In tradition, he is regarded as a symbol of Agama scriptures.

The twelve Alvar saints of Sri Vaishnavism are considered manifestations of Vishnu, with Nammalvar regarded specifically as an avatar of Vishvaksena. In his Srirangaraja Stava, the poet Bhattar includes taniyans (laudatory verses) dedicated to various acharyass (teachers). A taniyan in the later portion of work is dedicated to Vishvaksena, placing him within the traditional Sri Vaishna guru-parampara (lineage of teachers) running from Vishnu to Ramanujacharya, reflecting the integration of Pancharatra traditions into Sri Vaishnavism.

== Legends ==
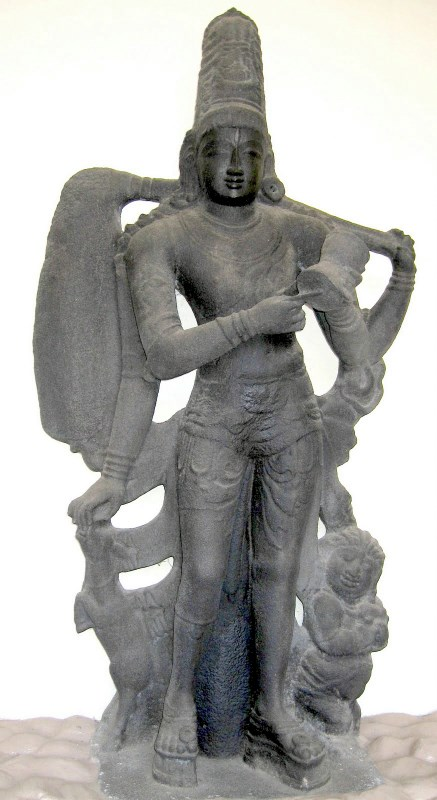
Shiva as Kankalamurti, who defeated Vishvaksena.

According to one legend, Vishvaksena, considered a son of Varuna, prayed to Lord Venkateswara at Tirumala to attain the position of commander of his forces.

The Kurma Purana describes a visit by Shiva in the form of a cursed mendicant (Bhikshatana, a manifestation of Bhairava) to Vaikuntha. The Vaikuntha gate was guarded by Vishvaksena, who did not recognise Shiva and refused him entry. Bhairava dispatched his attendant Kalavega to battle Vishvaksena, but Vishvaksena defeated him. When Vishvaksena charged toward Bhairava, the latter slew him with his trident (trishula) and impaled his body upon it. This form of Bhairava is known as Kankala or Kankalamurti ("the one with the skeleton").

== Worship ==
Vishvaksena holds a central role in the Vaikhanasa agama of Sri Vaishnavism. In this tradition, rituals and ceremonies begin with his worship, as he is believed to protect functions from obstacles and harm. This role parallels that of Ganesha, who is traditionally worshipped first in Hinduism, particularly within the Shaiva tradition.

In Sri Vaishnavism, Vishvaksena is regarded as a dispeller of obstacles, depicted with a bright complexion. Ramanuja noted that Sri Vaishnavas invoke Vishvaksena where other traditions worship Kartikeya or Ganesha.

In a taniyan, Bhattar invokes Vishvaksena as one who assists Vishnu and Lakshmi, directing conscious (chit) and unconscious (achit) creation through hand gesture. In another hymn, Bhattar addresses Vishvaksena, alongside his consort, Sutravati.

=== Mantra and mudra ===
The Lakshmi Tantra prescribes the worship of Vishvaksena and mention his mantra om rhum vaum jnanadaya namah. The devotee should meditate upon Vishvaksena while facing the north. Before offering rice to Vishnu, texts prescribe worshipping Vishvaksena with his mantra, a portion of the rice and oblations. In addition to invoking Vishvaksena during the rites, the Chief Priest offers prayers using anga mantras (anga meaning "body" and "mantra" meaning hymns") accompanied by hasta-mudras (hand gestures). The Vishvaksena anga-mantras recited at the beginning the rites are listed below:

"Om rhyram hrdayaya namaha (we salute your heart)
Om rhyrim sirasa svaha (salutation to the head)
Om rhrum sikhayai vausat (decorate the hairstyle)
Om rhraim havekcaya hum (decorate the hairstyle)
Om rhraum netraya vausat (decorate the eyes)
Om hrah astray phat.(decorate with armaments)"

The mudra associated with the Vishvaksena mantra, believed to grant liberation from human bondage, is formed as follows: Three fingers of the left hand, including the little finger, are folded into the palm, while the index finger is extended backward away from the thumb. On the right hand, three fingers are folded into the palm, as with the left hand, and the hand is placed beside the nostril. The index finger is then bent and placed atop of the thumb. Finally, teh right hand is raised to display the gestyre of throwing a discuss; executing this mudra completes the rite.

=== Temple rituals ===
At Tirumala Venkateswara Temple (which follows the Vaikhanasa agama tradition), Vishvaksena is worshipped before all rituals. His shrine is located on the northern side of the main temple within the Mukkoti Pradakshinam (circumambulatory path). Floral offerings (nirmalya) removed from the central murthy (idol) of Venkateshwara or subsequently offered to Vishvakseena. The annual Brahmotsavam festival commences with the worship of Vishvaksena, whose processional bronze murthy is carried around the temple precincts. In tradition, Vishvaksena is believed to oversee the festival and ensure its smooth conduct.

The practice of presenting the deity's puja remnants to Vishvaksena before the temple doors close is established in the Pancharatra tradition. The poet Kuresha noted that Vishvaksena subsists on the remnants of his master's food, signifying his master's favor.

The Srirangam Ranganathaswamy Temple also accords Vishvaksena a significant role in its celebrations. On the first day of the festival, processional murthis of Vishvaksena and Hanuman are paraded to the shrine of Ranganayaki, the presiding goddess. Priests collect soil from beneath a sacred bael tree and the banks of the Kaveri river, symbolically gathered by the deities, to sow seeds for the Ankurarpanam (germination) ritual. Subsequently, during the Nagarasodani rite, Vishvaksena is carried in procession to inspect the streets before the main festival procession begins.

At the Varadharaja Perumal Temple in Kanchipuram, the Brahmotsavam similarly begins on the eve of the main festival with worship and a procession of Vishvaksena, locally referred to as Senai Mudaliar.

== Bibliography ==
- Sanjukta Gupta (1972). Laksmi Tantra a Pancaratra text. Brill Archive. pp. 263–. GGKEY:20P66TDPELS.
- Nancy Ann Nayar (1992). Poetry as Theology: The Śrīvaiṣṇava Stotra in the Age of Rāmānuja. Otto Harrassowitz Verlag. pp. 145–. ISBN 978-3-447-03255-1.
- Roshen Dalal (5 October 2011). Hinduism: An Alphabetical Guide. Penguin Books India. pp. 20, 270, 460–462. ISBN 978-0-14-341421-6.
