= Kankalamurti =

Aspect of Hindu god Shiva

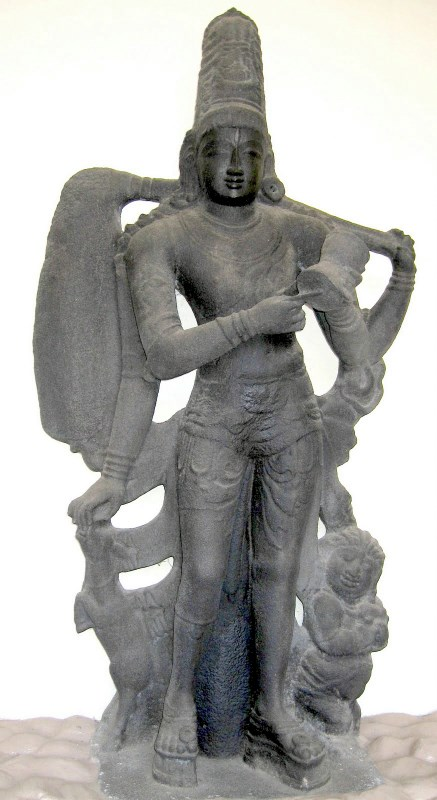
Kankalamurti, Darasuram (12th century), currently in Thanjavur Maratha Palace museum, Thanjavur

Kankalamurti (Sanskrit: कङ्कालमूर्ति, romanized: Kaṅkālamūrti, lit."skeleton form"), also known as Kankala ("skeleton") or Kankala-Bhairava, is an iconographical form of the Hindu god Shiva. He is often associated with a fearsome aspect of Shiva, Bhairava, and also considered to be the latter's aspect. Kankalamurti is popular in South Indian temples of Shiva, but almost unknown in North India. He is described in Shaiva legends to have defeated and slain Vishnu's army-chief and gate-keeper Vishvaksena or Vishnu's avatar Vamana. He is depicted as a four-armed man with a kankala-danda (skeleton-staff) in his hand and followed by bhuta ganas (ghostly attendants) and love-sick women.

== Legend ==
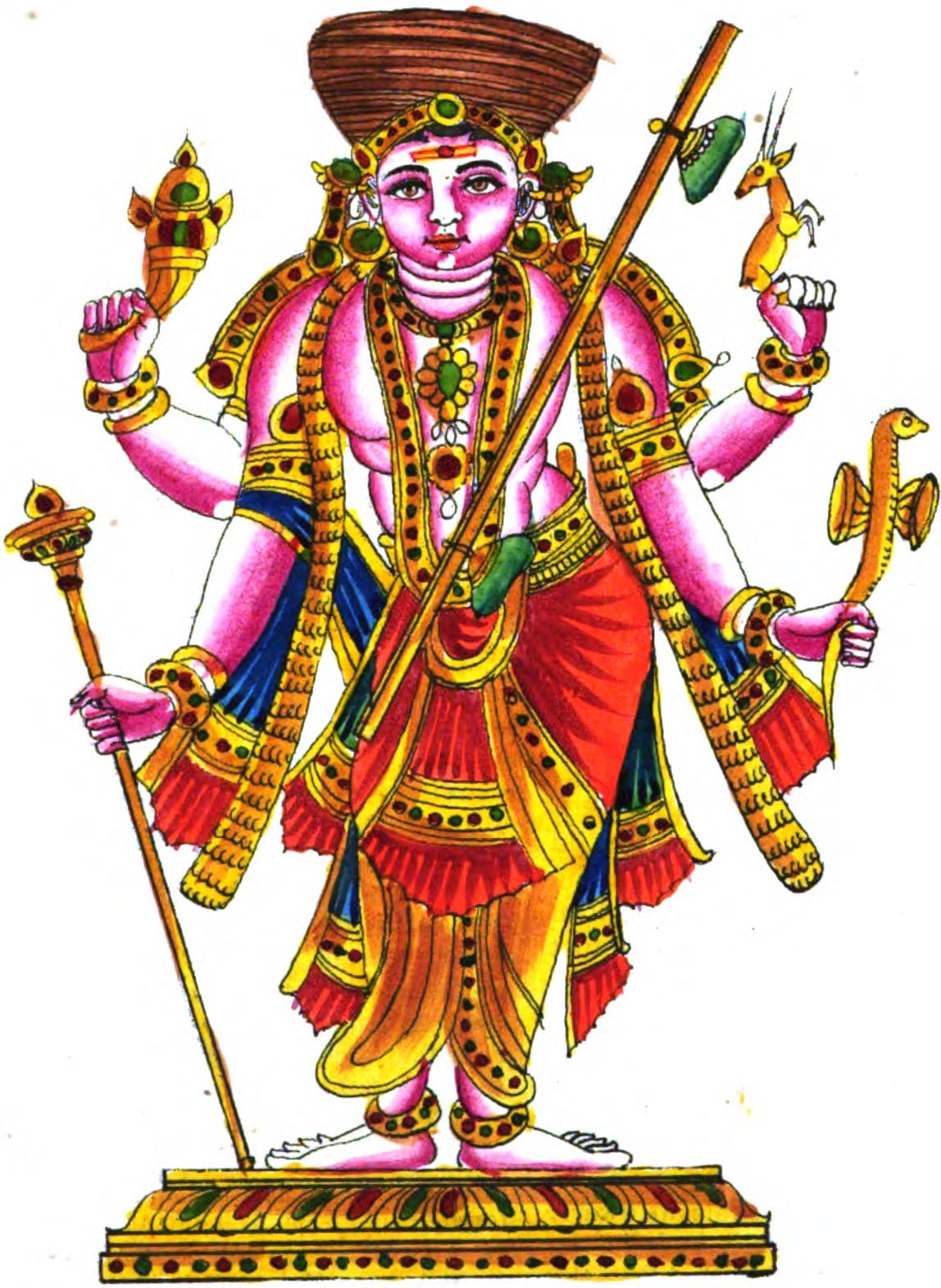
Kankalamurti depicted in a painting, 1842.

Kankalamurti is one of the three most popular aspects of Bhairava; the others being Brahmashiraschedaka-murti and Bhikshatana-murti. Shiva – as the terrifying Bhairava – cuts the fifth head of the creator-god Brahma (an act iconographically depicted as Brahmashiraschedaka-murti) and that head/skull stuck as kapala (skull-cup) to Bhairava's left palm due to the sin of beheading Brahma. To expiate the sin, Bhairava had to undertake the vow of a Kapali: wandering the world as a naked mendicant with the skull of the slain as his begging bowl. This gentle beggar form is Bhikshatana-murti.

The Kurma Purana narrates that Bhairava, after the encounter with the sages of the Devadaru forest, continued to wander, visiting various countries of gods and demons before he finally reached the abode of the god Vishnu. Vishnu's gatekeeper Vishvaksena did not allow him to enter. Angered, Bhairava slew Vishvaksena, impaled the corpse on his trishula (trident) and carrying it over his shoulder, which added to his sin. Bhikshatana-murti transformed into Kankala-murti, the one with a skeleton. Bhairava, now as Kankala-murti, entered Vishnu's abode and begged for food. Vishnu offered his own blood as food in one version. In another version, Vishnu cut an artery on Bhairava's forehead; a stream of blood spurts into his begging bowl as his food. Vishnu then directed Bhairava to visit the sacred city of Varanasi, where his sin would be expiated. The encounter with Vishnu's gatekeeper is also retold with some variation in the Vamana Purana and the Matsya Purana. Kankala-murti wandered with his begging bowl in his hand and the corpse or skeleton on his shoulder.

All Puranas agree that upon reaching Varanasi, Brahma's skull falls off Bhairava's palm and Vishvaksena's corpse disappears. Vishvaksena is resurrected and the sanctified Bhairava-Shiva casts off the appearance of Kankala-murti and returns to his abode.

Another legend about Kankalamurti is that Shiva assumed the form when he slew Vamana, an avatar of Vishnu. Vishnu assumed the form of Vamana, a huge form that encompassed the huge universe to teach a lesson to the demon Mahabali. After Mahabali was humbled, the Vamana form became a nuisance to the world and the gods. On their request, Shiva destroyed Vamana and used his back bone as a weapon. Thus, Shiva held the kankala (bones) of Vamana and became known as Kankalamurti. Another interpretation is that Kankalamurti is Shiva as the dissolver of the universe and the bones symbolize destruction.

== Iconography ==
Kankalamurti's company, Darasuram, currently in Thanjavur Maratha Palace museum

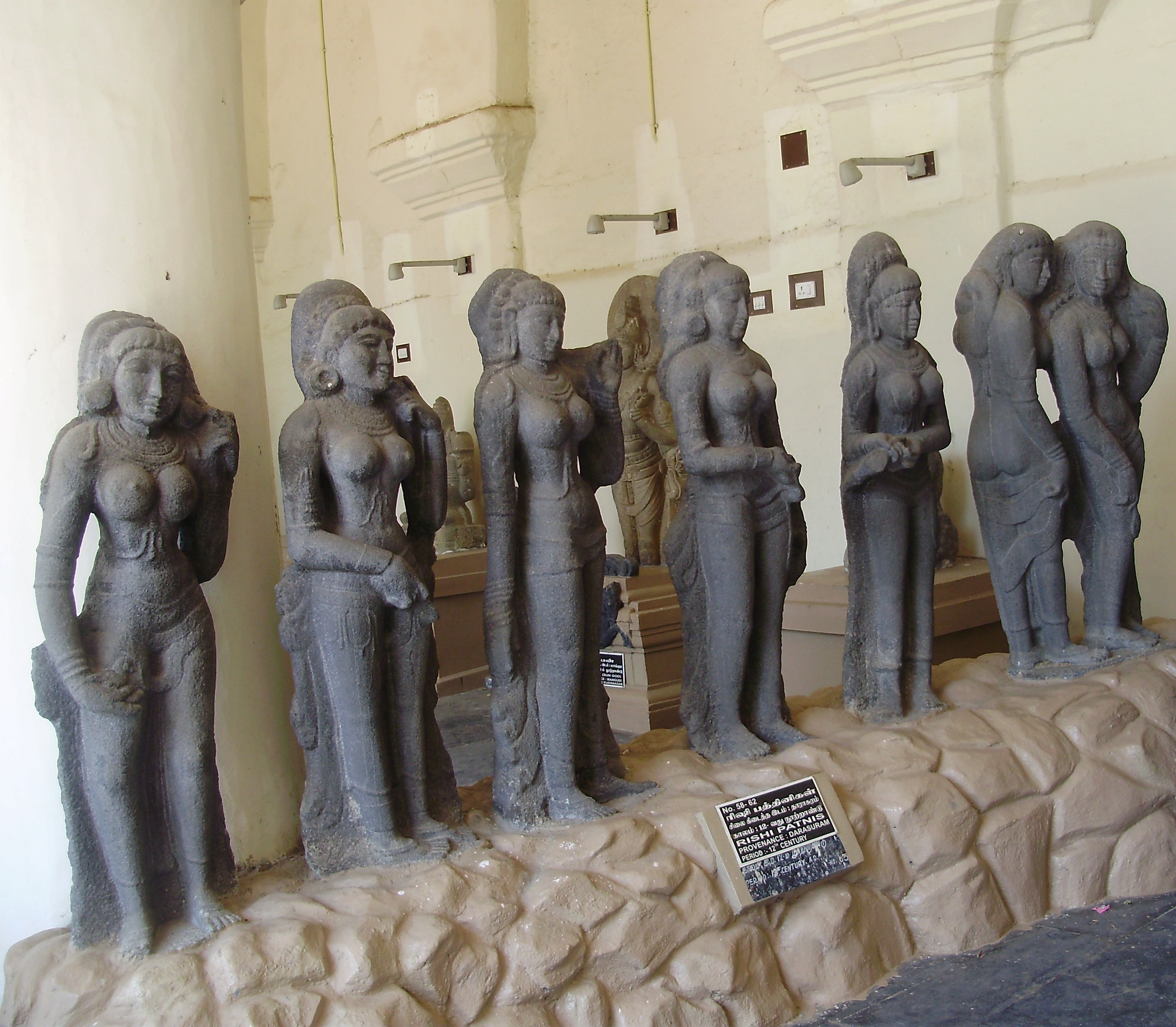
The seven wives of the sages

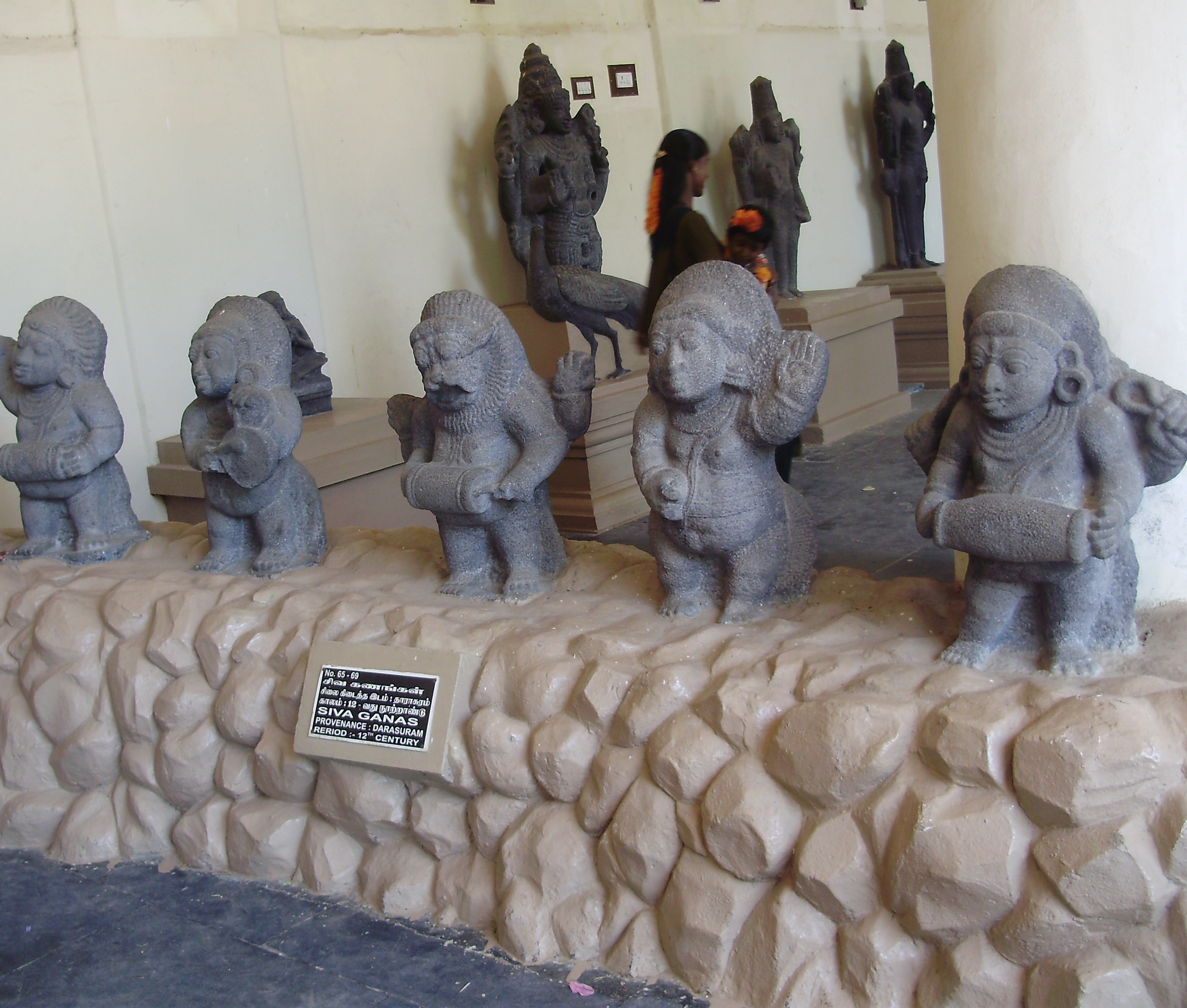
The five bhuta-gana

The iconography of Kankalamurti is discussed in all Shaiva Agamic texts, including Amshumadbhedagama, Kamikagama, Supredagama, Karanagama and the iconographic work Shilparatna; the texts are mostly South Indian in origin. The iconography is quite similar to Bhikshatana-murti. The chief difference is that Kankala-murti is clothed and Bhikshatana is nude.

Kankalamurti is depicted with a jatamukuta (matted hair piled up in form of a crown), adorned by the crescent moon on the right and a serpent and datura flowers on the left. He may also wear a crown with his hair flowing from the sides. He should bear a happy expression, as though singing songs. He wears ordinary kundalas (earrings) or a makara-kundala (makara-shaped earring) in the right ear and a shankhapatra (earring made of conch) in the other. Kankalamurti wears red upper garments and a short pant made of tiger hide and silk. His complexion is white. A white yagnopavita (sacred thread) is worn across the chest.

Kankalamurti is depicted with four arms. His front left hand holds a drum called dhakka or damaru and his front right hand holds a bana, a short stick by which the drum is played. His back right arm is stretched out downwards and the hand held in the kataka gesture, near the mouth of his pet deer or antelope, who playfully leaps near the hand. His back left arm holds a kankala-danda, a staff on which the bones of the arms and legs of the slain person are tied. Decorated with peacock feathers, a flag and a small bell at the end, the staff is held horizontally and rests on the left shoulder. In bronze images, the deer may be cast separately or be absent and the back left hand is also carved in kataka gesture so that a separately cast kankala-danda may be placed in it. The Suprabhedagama, the kanakala is of Vishnu. Snake ornaments adorn his body and a waist-band has a golden dagger tucked in it. Kankalamurti should be standing with his left leg straight and firm on the ground and his right one, slightly bent, suggesting walking. He often wears paduka (wooden sandals).

Kankalamurti is often accompanied by women and bhuta-gana (goblin attendants of Shiva). One of the attendants placed to the left should carry a large bowl used for storing the food alms of Shiva. The women, sometimes seven – wives of the seven great sages as in the Darasuram sculpture now in the Thanjavur Maratha Palace museum, are variously pictured as enamoured of Shiva, eager to embrace him, blessing him, or serving him food in his begging bowl with a ladle. Sometimes as in the Lepakshi Temple, there may be only one woman. The clothes of some of these women are slipping from their loins, symbolising their lust. Various gods, celestial beings, and sages bow to him with folded hands. Some gods are prescribed to be shown cleaning Kankalamurti's path, others singing his praises or showering him with flowers. The corpse of Vishvaksena is sometimes added in the scene, as in the temples of Suchindram, Thirumarugal and Nageswaraswamy Temple.

An iconographic description according to a hymn says that Kankalamurti is blood red smeared over his body and has three eyes. His head is adorned with the crescent moon. He has four lotus hands like the four Vedas. He holds a kankala-danda, an axe (parashu), a deer and beats the drum with a hand. Adorned with skeletons and the veena, Kankalamurti is the "god with skeletons".

In another description, Kankalamurti is said to hold a kankala-danda, a club, a deer and a damaru with a serpent around it and carry the veena around his neck.

Kankalamurti and Bhikshatana are seen in every major South Indian temple of Shiva, almost not known in North India. In the four gopurams (towers) of Chidambaram Temple, in Tamil Nadu, there are four large niches and each niche has one of the four forms of Shiva: Kankalamurti, Bhikshatana, Somaskanda and Kalyanasundara.
