= Tiruppaatrurai Adhimooleswarar Temple =

Thirupatruthurai Adhimooleswarar Temple
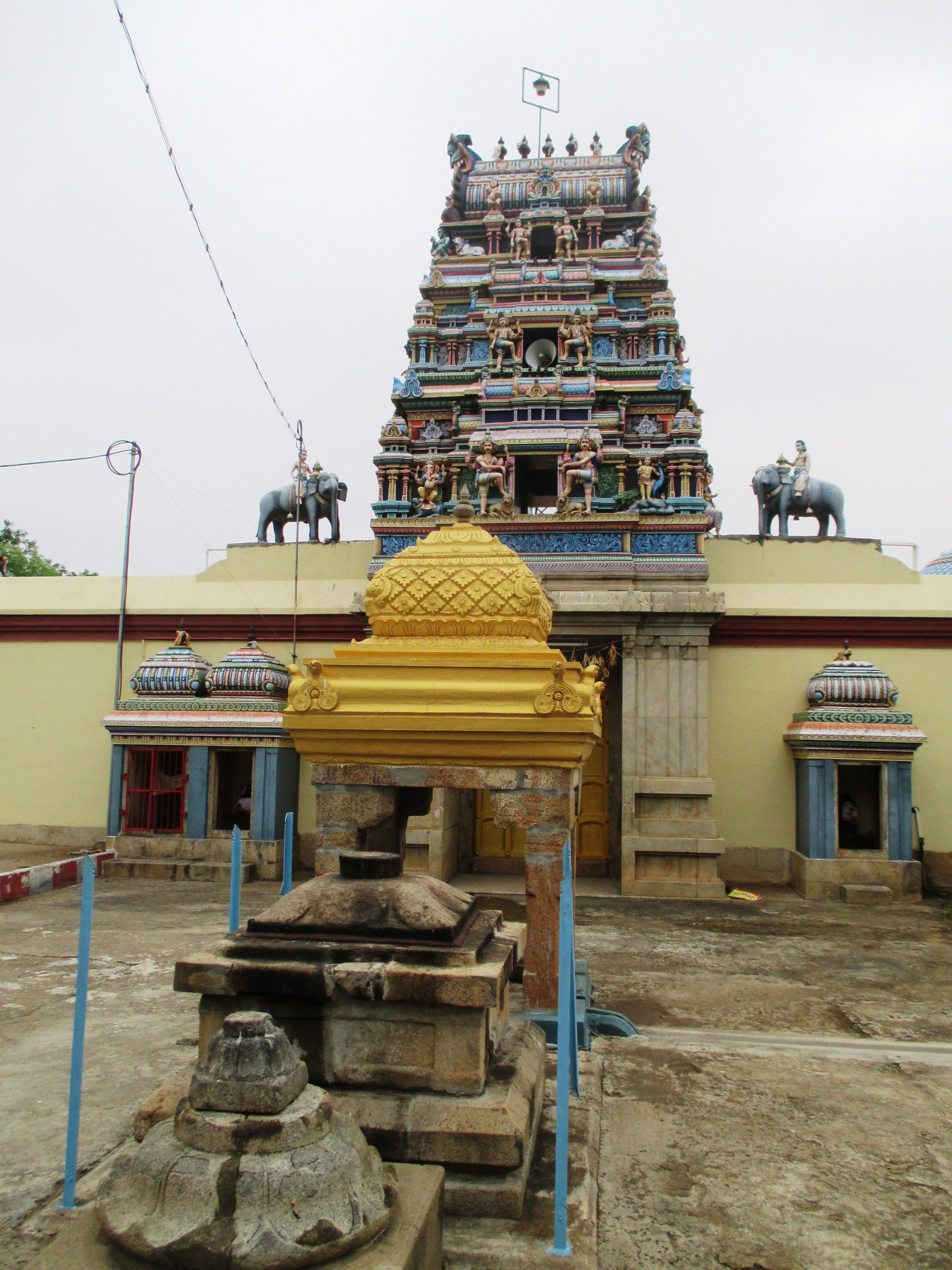

- Location in Tamil Nadu

Religion
- Affiliation: Hinduism
- District: Tiruchirapalli
- Deity: Adhimooleswarar(Shiva)

Location
- Location: Panayur
- State: Tamil Nadu
- Country: India
- Coordinates: 10°50′45″N 78°46′09″E

Architecture
- Type: Dravidian architecture

Tiruppaatrurai Adhimooleswarar Temple (திருப்பாற்றுறை ஆதிமூலேசுவரர் கோயில்) is a Hindu temple dedicated to Shiva (Adhimooleswarar) located at Tirupattrurai in Trichy district of Tamil Nadu, India. The historical name of the place is Tirupalathurai. The temple is revered in the 7th century Tamil Shaiva canon, the Tevaram, written by the Tamil Nayanar saint-poets and thus classified as Paadal Petra Sthalam.

It has several inscriptions dating back to the Chola period. The temple has six daily rituals at various times from 5:30 a.m. to 8 p.m., and three yearly festivals on its calendar. The annual Brahmotsavam (prime festival) is attended by many pilgrims. The temple is maintained and administered by the Hindu Religious and Endowment Board of the Government of Tamil Nadu.

== Legend ==
As per Hindu legend, a Chola king was chasing a bird, on a hunting expedition in the region. The bird hid inside a bush. The king shot an arrow, towards the bush. Instead of the bird, he found an ant hill, oozing milk when the arrow hit. The frightened king returned to his palace. That night, the god Shiva appeared in the king's dream and informed about his divine presence in the anthill. Consequently, the king established a temple in the place of the anthill.

== Architecture ==
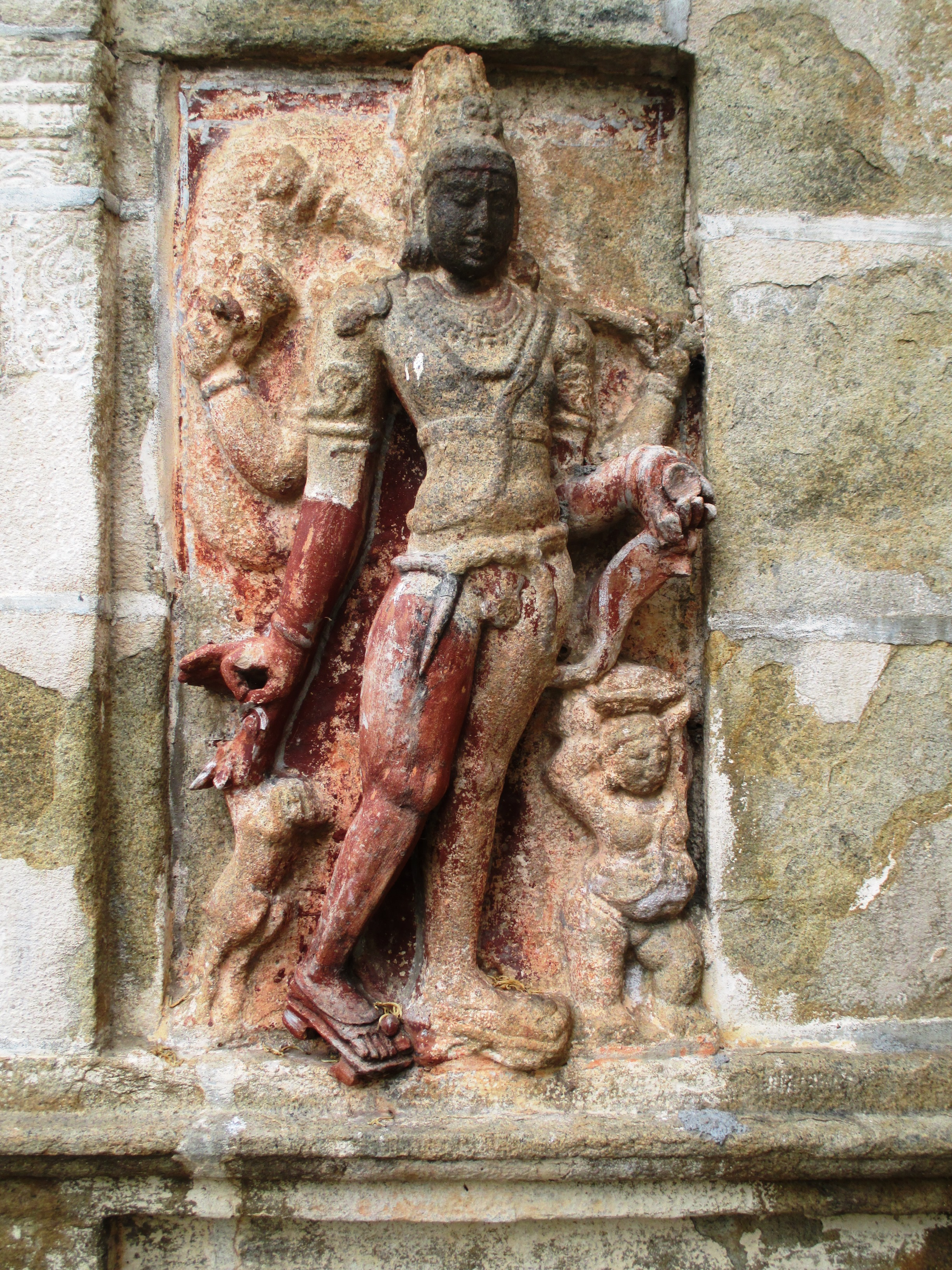
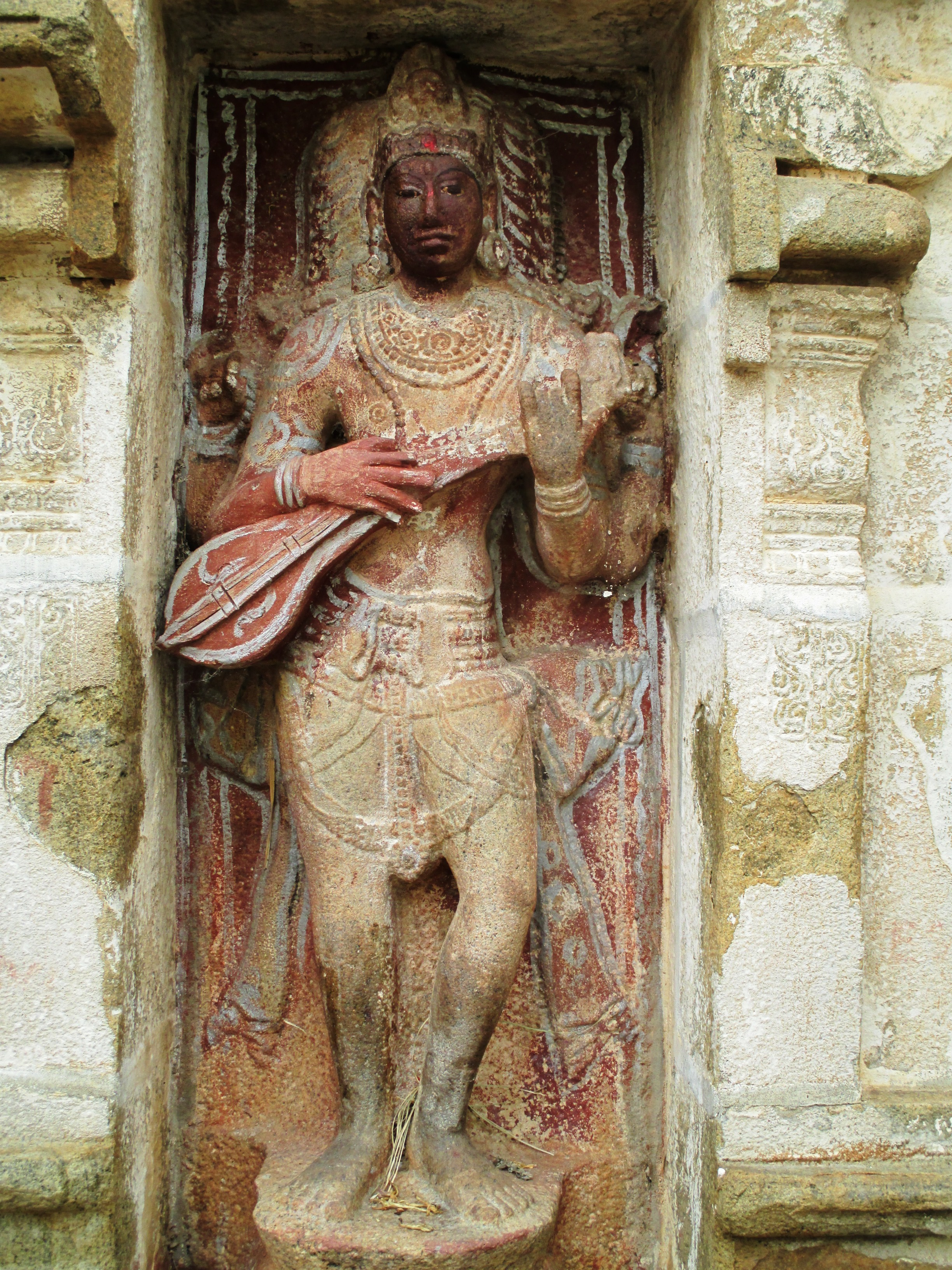
Bhikshatana and Veena-holding Dakshinamurthy sculptures in the temple

Adhimooleswarar temple complex has two prakarams (outer courtyard) and a small five-tiered rajagopuram (gateway tower). The central shrine faces east and holds the image of Adhimooleswarar (Shiva) in the form of a granite lingam. The granite images of the deities Ganesha (son of Shiva and god of wisdom), Murugan (son of Shiva and god of war), Nandi (the bull and vehicle of Shiva), and Navagraha (nine planetary deities) are located in the hall leading to the sanctum. The hall leading to the sanctum also has the South facing shrine of Nithyakalyani (Parvati), the consort of Adhimooleswarar, in standing posture. As in other Shiva temples of Tamil Nadu, the first precinct or the walls around the sanctum have images of Dakshinamurthy (Shiva as the Teacher), Durga (warrior-goddess), and Chandikeswarar (a saint and devotee of Shiva). There are also images of Bhikshatana, Dakshinamurthy sporting a Veena, and Vishnu. The first precinct is surrounded by granite walls.

== Significance ==
It is one of the shrines of the 275 Paadal Petra Sthalams - Shiva Sthalams glorified in the early medieval Tevaram poems by Tamil Saivite Nayanar Tirugnanasambandar.

== Literary mention ==
Tirugnanasambandar describes the feature of the deity as:

மாகந் தோய்மதி சூடி மகிழ்ந்தென

தாகம் பொன்னிற மாக்கினார்
பாகம் பெண்ணு முடையவர் பாற்றுறை

நாகம் ழுண்ட நயவரே.
