= Uthamar Kovil =

Perumal temple in Tiruchirappalli district, Tamil Nadu, India

- Purushothaman Perumal
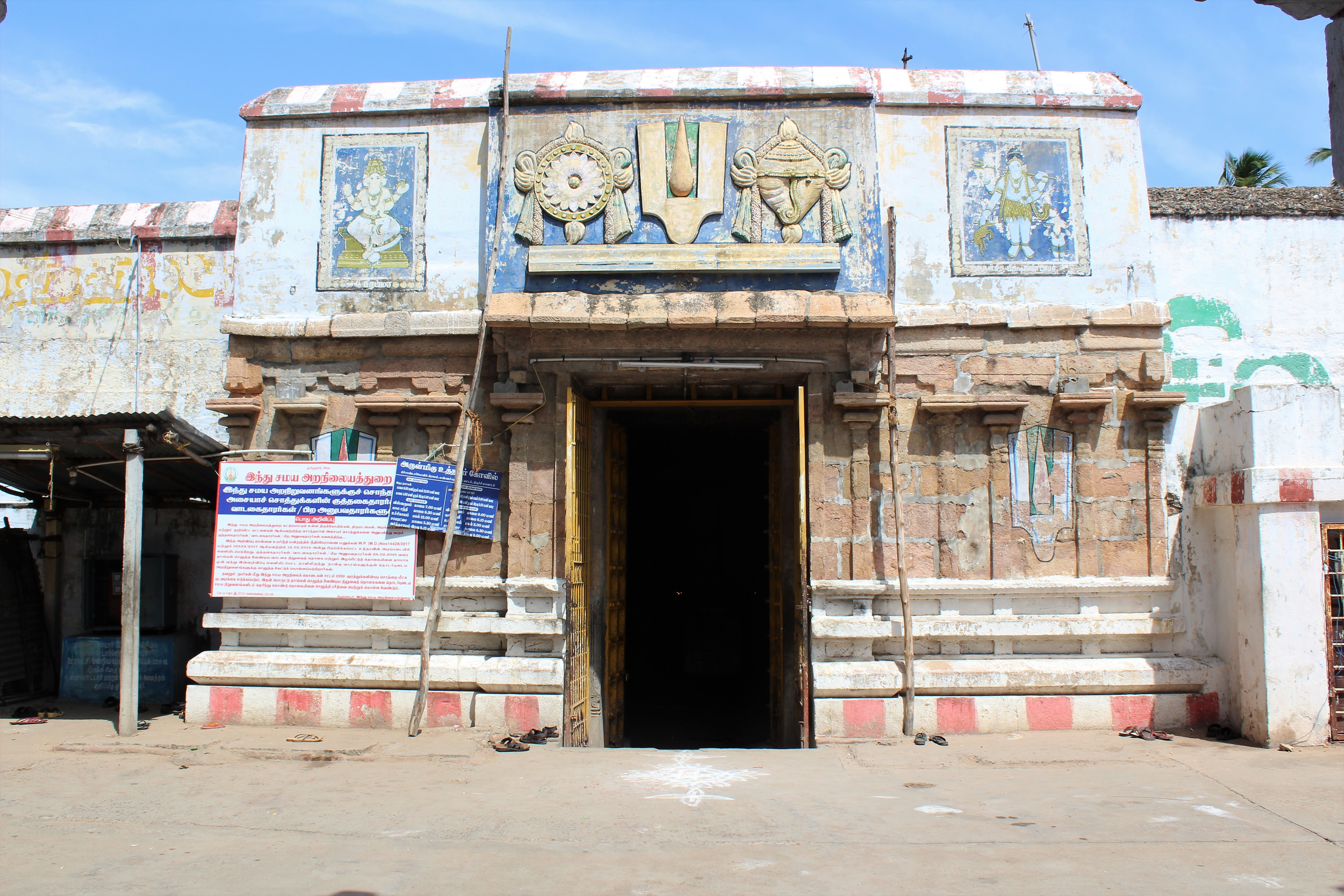
- The shrine of temple

- Location in Tamil Nadu

Religion
- Affiliation: Hinduism
- District: Tiruchirappalli
- Deity: Purushothaman Perumal (Vishnu); Poornavalli Thayar (Lakshmi); Bikshandar (Shiva); Soundarya Parvati (Parvati); Brahma; Saraswati

Location
- Location: Tamilnadu, India
- State: Tamil Nadu
- Country: India
- Coordinates: 10.877161°N 78.703141°E

Architecture
- Type: Dravidian architecture
- Creator: Cholas

Uthamar Kovil (also known as Thirukkarambanoor or Bhikshandar Kovil) in Uthamarkoil, a village in the outskirts of Tiruchirappalli in the Indian state of Tamil Nadu, is a temple to the Hindu Trimurti of Vishnu, Shiva, and Brahma. Constructed in the Dravidian style of architecture, the temple is mentioned in the Nalayira Divya Prabandham, the early medieval Tamil canon of the Alvar saints from the 6th–9th centuries CE. It is one of the 108 Divya Desams dedicated to Vishnu, who is worshipped as Purushothaman Perumal (also called as Purushothamar) and his consort Lakshmi as Poornavalli Thayar.

Purushottamar is believed to have appeared to Hindu gods Brahma and Shiva, to relieve Shiva off his sins committed while cutting one of Brahma's heads. The temple is one of the few historical temples in India where the images of the Trimurti, Vishnu, Shiva and Brahma are housed in the same premises. It is one of the two temples in Chola Nadu where the trinity can be seen in the same premises, the other being Hara Saabha Vimocchana Perumal Temple at Thirukkandiyur.

The temple is believed to have been built by the Medieval Cholas of the late 8th century CE, with later contributions from Vijayanagara kings and Madurai Nayaks. A granite wall surrounds the temple, enclosing all its shrines, while the temple tank is located outside the main gateway.

The temple is maintained and administered by the Hindu Religious and Endowment Board of the Government of Tamil Nadu.

== Etymology and legend ==
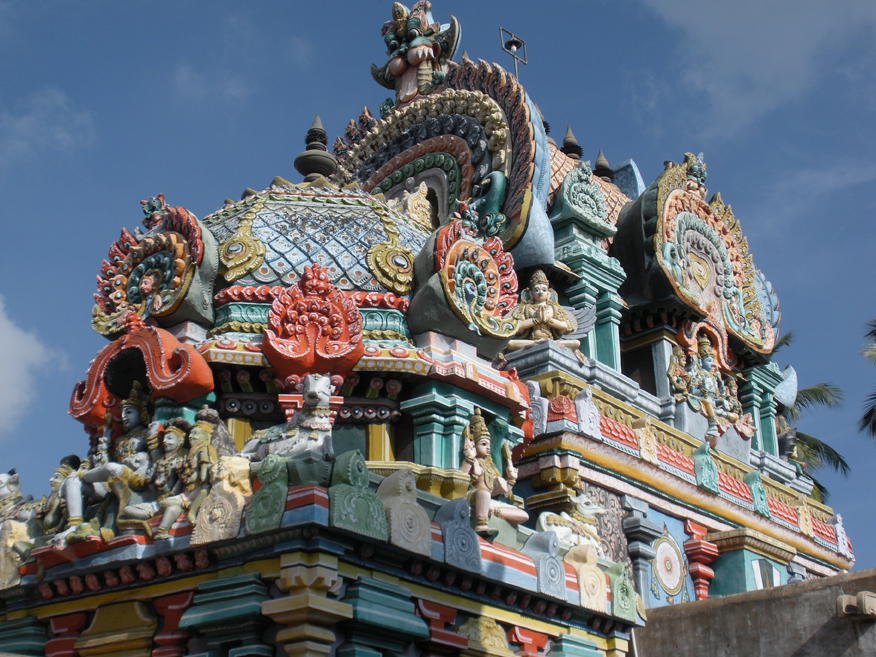
Uthyanga Vimanam, the roof of the sanctum

As per Hindu legend, the god Vishnu emerged as a Kadamba tree here, giving the name Kathambanur, which later became Karambanur. The name Karambanur is mentioned by Thirumangai Alvar in Nalayira Divya Prabandam, in which he refers to the presiding deity as "Karambanur Uthaman". The temple is commonly called "Uthamar Kovil" derived from the presiding deity. The temple is also called Bhikshandar Kovil as the god Shiva is present in the form of Bhikshandar (a mendicant) and believed to have attained cure by worshiping Vishnu at this place.

As per Hindu legend, once Vishnu wanted to test the devotion of the god Brahma. He raised as a Kadamba tree in the place; Brahma worshipped him with thirumanjanam (ablution). The water from the ablution filled a tank nearby, which came to be known as "Kathamba Theertham". Vishnu was satisfied with the devotion of Brahma and gave a boon to Brahma to have a shrine in this place. Shiva wanted to expiate the sin for decapitating a head of Brahma and went on a pilgrimage. Here, Vishnu requested his consort Lakshmi to give alms to Shiva. Shiva's grail was filled by the alms and Lakshmi came to be known as Poornavalli Thayar (the one who filled the grail).

As per another legend, Brahma and Shiva both had originally five heads. Parvati, the wife of Shiva, once got confused and worshipped Brahma, instead of her husband. Shiva got enraged and cut off one of Brahma's heads; the head stuck in Shiva's hand due to Brahma's curse. To atone for the sin, Shiva worshipped Vishnu here; Shiva was fully relieved of the curse after worshipping Vishnu at Hara Saabha Vimocchana Perumal Temple.

According to another Hindu legend, the temple is believed to have been constructed by Janaka, the king of Janakapuri and the father of the goddess Sita. Thirumangai Alvar is believed to have resided in the temple to build the surrounding walls of the Srirangam Ranganathaswamy temple.

== Temple ==
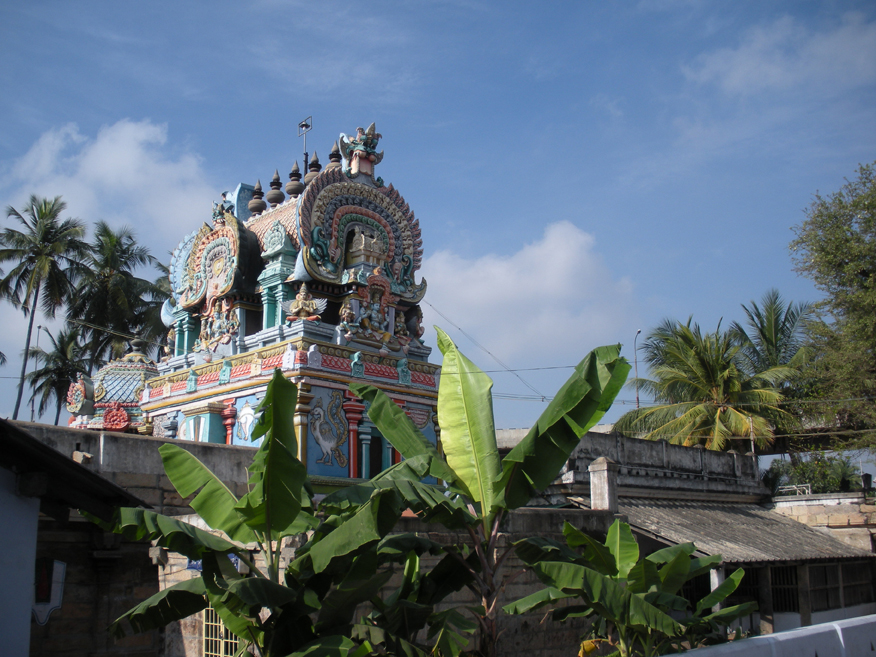
Inside Uttamarkoil seen with the Sthalaviruksham – Kadhali(red banana)

The temple is believed to have been built by the Medieval Cholas of the late 8th century CE, with later contributions from Vijayanagara kings and Madurai Nayaks. During the war between British and French in 1751, the temple acted as an infantry for both the troops. There was no damage done to the temple during the war.

The Saptaguru or seven gurus (teachers) are identified in the temple. The seven are Bhikshadanar (representing Sadasiva Guru, Shiva as a guru), Brahma (Brahma Guru), Soundarya Parvati (Shakti Guru, the Goddess as a guru), Brihaspati (Deva Guru, the teacher of the gods), Varadarajaperumal (Vishnu Guru), Murugan (Gnana Guru, the guru of knowledge) and Shukra (Asura Guru, the guru of demons).

== Religious significance ==
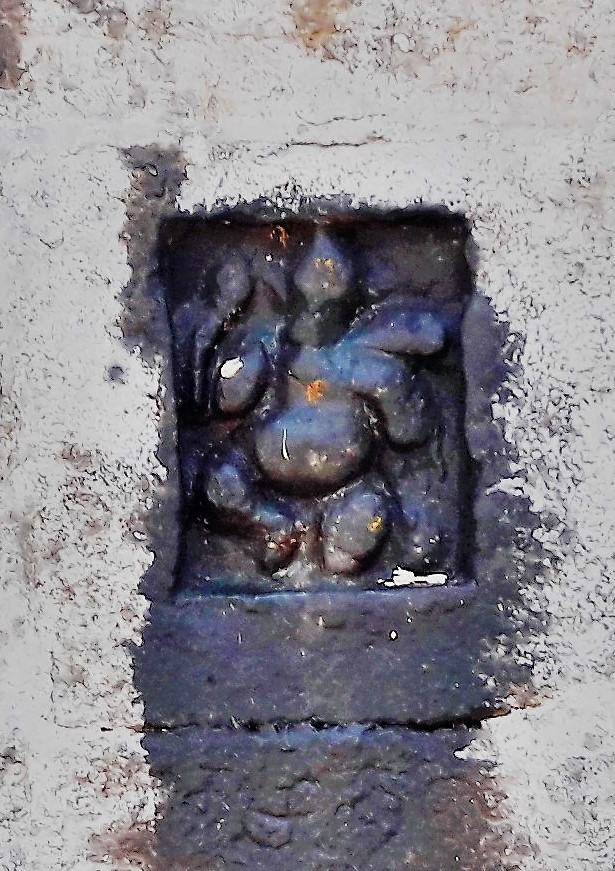
Sculpture of Vinayaga on the wall of the temple

Uthamar Kovil is one of the two temples in Chola Nadu where the trinity can be seen in the same premises, the other being Hara Saabha Vimocchana Perumal Temple at Thirukkandiyur. Trimurti in Hindu mythology refers to the cosmic functions of creation, maintenance, and destruction. They are personified by the forms of Brahma the creator, Vishnu the preserver, and Shiva, the destroyer.

The temple is revered in Nalayira Divya Prabandham, the 7th–9th century Vaishnava canon, by Thirumangai Alvar in ten hymns. The temple is classified as a Divya Desam, one of the 108 Vishnu temples that are mentioned in the book. Thirumangai Alvar have sung in praise of the perumal in this temple with one pasuram (hymn).

Periyavachan Pillai, who translated the verses of Thirumangai Alvar, glorifies the temple as "the one without doors where devotees can always visit and worship".
