= Hara Saabha Vimocchana Perumal Temple =

Perumal temple in Thanjavur district, Tamil Nadu, India

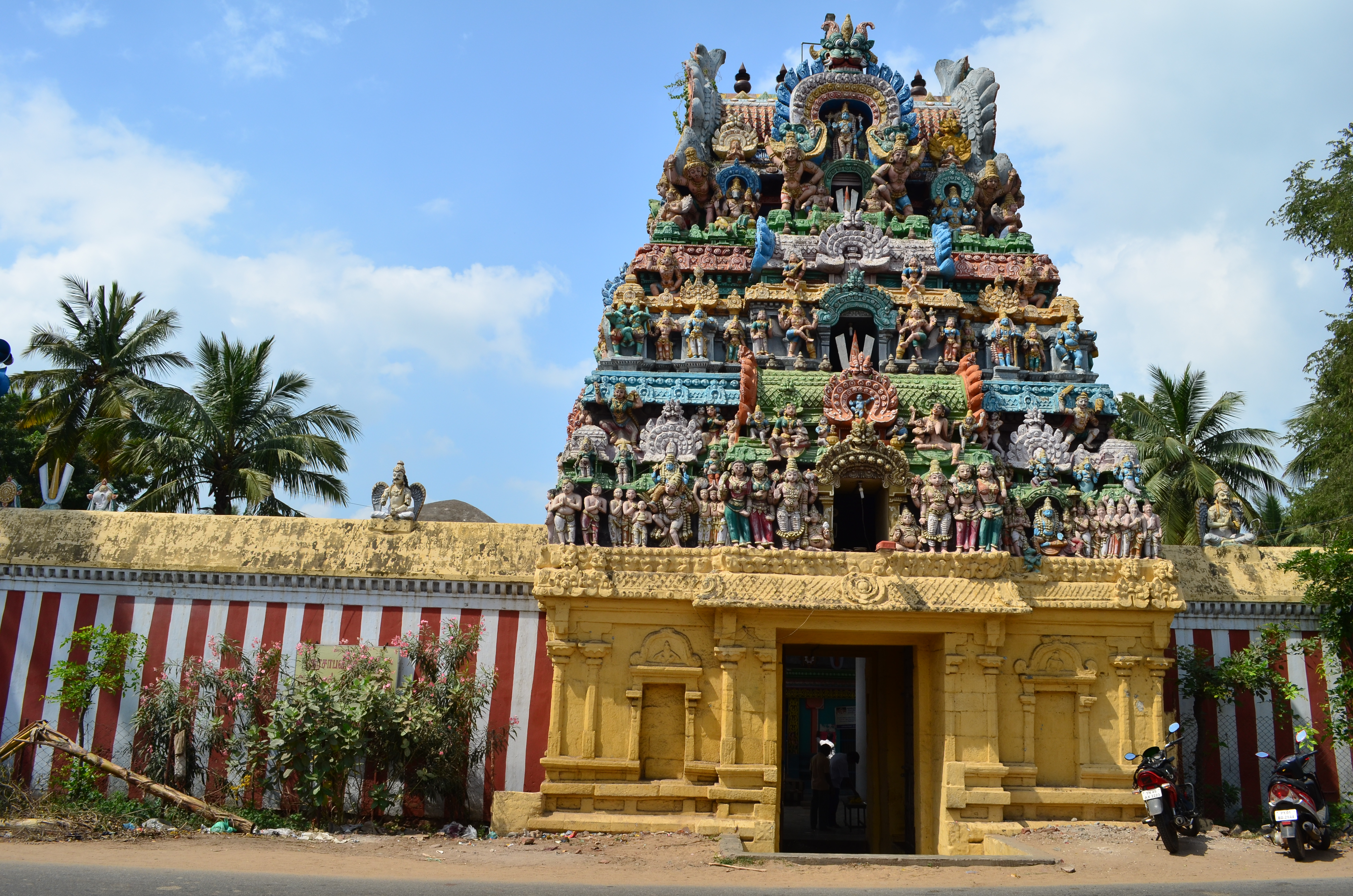

- Location in Tamil Nadu

Religion
- Affiliation: Hinduism
- District: Thanjavur
- Deity: Hara Saabha Vimocchana Perumal (Vishnu); Kamalavalli Nachiyar (Lakshmi)
- Features: Temple tank: Kapala Moksha Pushkarani

Location
- Location: Tamilnadu, India
- State: Tamil Nadu
- Country: India
- Coordinates: 10°51′36″N 79°6′30″E

Architecture
- Type: Dravidian architecture

Hara Saabha Vimochana Perumal Temple in Thirukandiyur, a village in the outskirts of Thiruvayaru in the South Indian state of Tamil Nadu, is dedicated to the Hindu god Vishnu. Constructed in the Dravidian style of architecture, the temple is glorified in the Nalayira Divya Prabandham, the early medieval Tamil canon of the Alvar saints from the 6th–9th centuries CE. It is one of the 108 Divya Desam dedicated to Vishnu, who is worshipped as Hara Saabha Vimochana Perumal and his consort Lakshmi as Kamalavalli Nachiyar.

The temple is believed to have been built by the Medieval Cholas of the late 8th century CE, with later contributions from Vijayanagara kings and Madurai Nayaks. A granite wall surrounds the temple, enclosing all its shrines and its bodies of water. The temple has a 5-tiered rajagopuram, the temple's gateway tower.

Hara Saabha Vimochana Perumal is believed to have appeared to Hindu gods Brahma and Shiva, and King Mahabali. It is one of the few temples where the Trimurti - Brahma, Vishnu and Shiva are worshipped in the same premises. Six daily rituals and four yearly festivals are held at the temple, of which the Panguni Brahmostavam, celebrated during the Tamil month of Panguni (April–May), is the most prominent. The temple is maintained and administered by the Hindu Religious and Endowment Board of the Government of Tamil Nadu.

== Legend ==
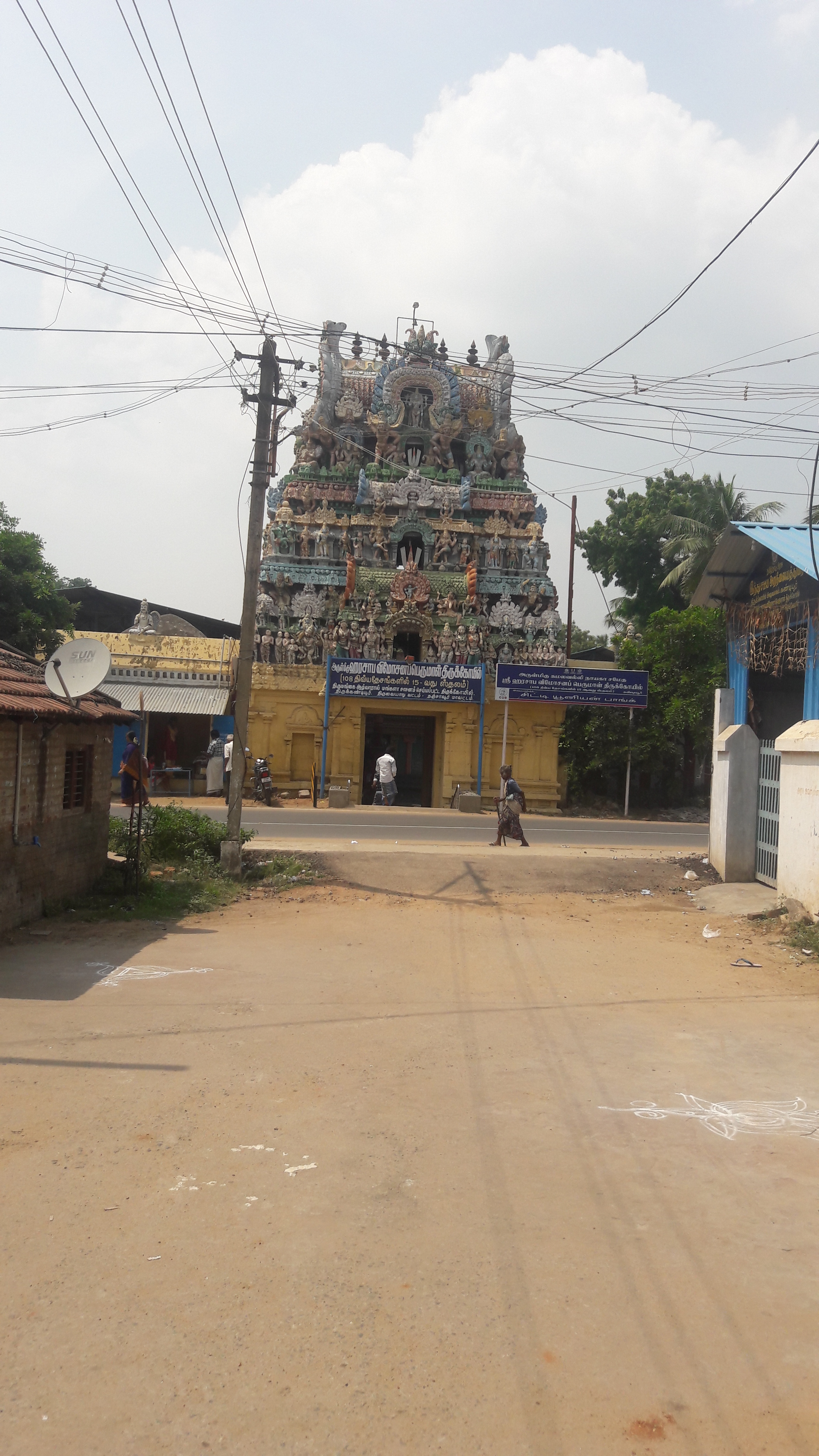
View of the street

As per the account in Brahmanda Purana, Brahma, the Hindu god of creation and Shiva, the Hindu god of destruction, had originally five heads. Parvati, the wife of Shiva, once got confused and worshipped Brahma, instead of her husband. Shiva got enraged and cut off one of Brahma's heads; the head stuck to Shiva's hand due to the curse of Brahmahatya. To get rid off the sin, Shiva worshipped the god Vishnu at Thirukarambanur as Bhikshatana, where his sin was relieved. Shiva freed himself from the sin after visiting Vishnu at Thirukandiyur and taking a holy dip in the temple tank, Kamala Pushkarani. Since Vishnu relieved (vimochana) the sin (saabha) of Shiva (also called Hara), the temple is called Hara Saabha Vimochana Perumal Temple. After the incident, the tank came to be known as Kapala Theertham (kapala indicates skull). Shiva was pleased and he built the Hara Sabha Vimochana temple and also built a temple for himself near it.

Sage Bhrigu, King Mahabali and the moon-god Chandra expiated their sins, worshipping Vishnu here. Sage Bhrigu, once wanted to test the superior of the Trinity of Brahma, Vishnu and Shiva. He kicked Vishnu in his chest in anger; the sage atoned here. Chandra sinned by seducing his guru's wife; he partially expiated by worshipping here.

== History ==
The temple is believed to have been built by the Medieval Cholas of the late 8th century CE, with later contributions from Vijayanagara kings and Madurai Nayaks. In modern times, the recorded temple renovation was carried out in 1984 under the aegis of seer Sri Thirukudanthai Vedanta Ramanuja Mahadesikan. The renovation is 2003 was carried out by his successor Sri Rangaramanuja Mahadesikan. The works involved renovation of the gateway tower and the shrines of Hara Saabha Vimocahana Perumal and Kamalavalli Nachiyar. The oldest deities of the temple are found to be that of Santana Gopala and Navneetha Krishna. It is believed that Tipu Sultan, the king of Mysore fought and won a war at this place and later became a devotee of the temple.

== Architecture ==
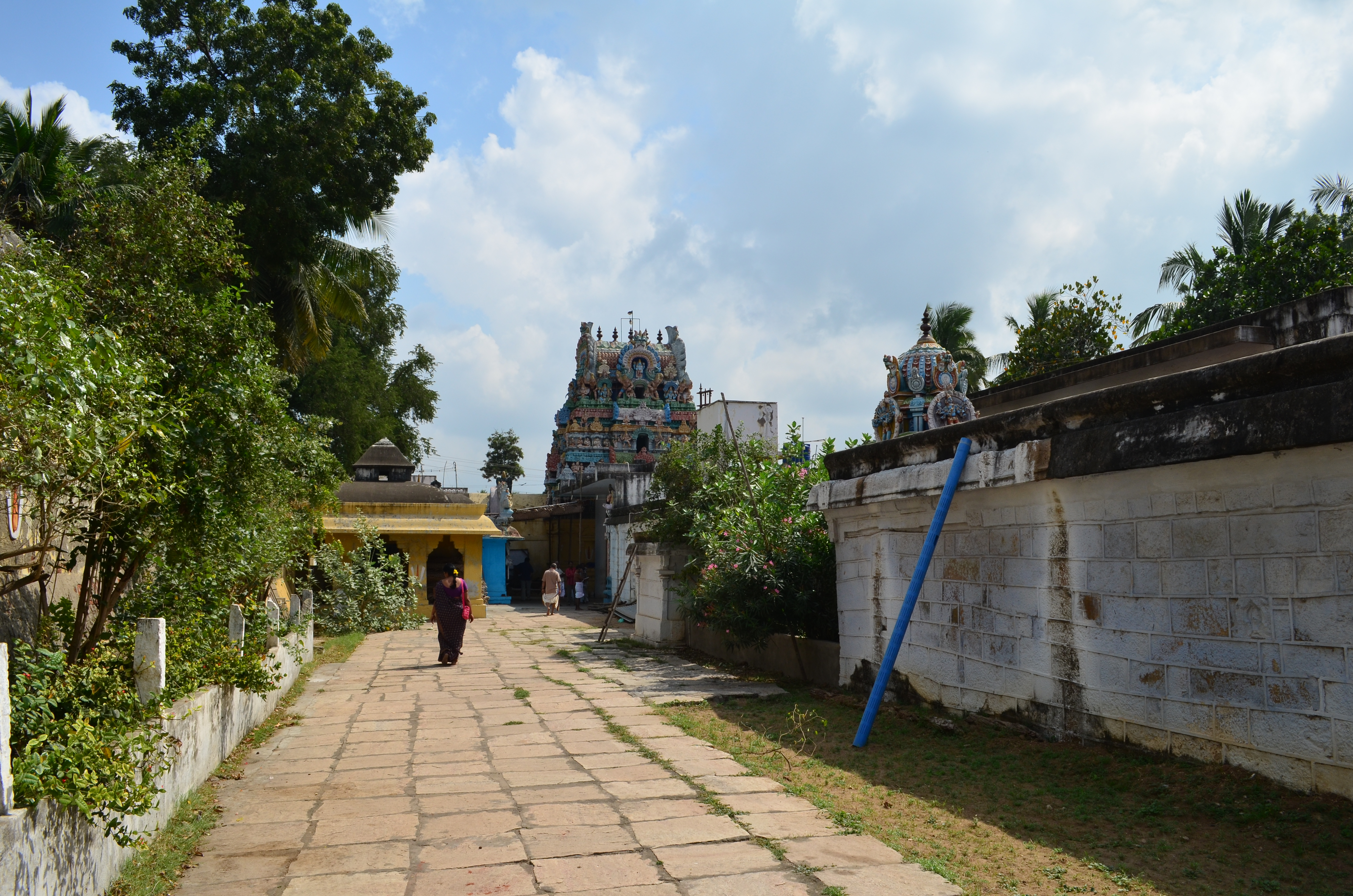
The precinct of the temple

Hara Saabha Vimocchana Perumal Temple is located in Thirukandiyur, a village located between Thiruvayyaru and Thanjavur, in between the rivers Cauvery and Kudamaurutti. The temple has a three-tiered rajagopuram (gateway tower) and an adjoining granite wall that surrounds the temple. The temple occupies an area of 1 acre (0.0040 km^{2}) and is located in the between the rivers Kudamurutti and Vennar. The temple is located 2 km (1.2 mi) away from Thiruvayaru in Thanjavur district. The temple has two precincts and the main gateway faces the east. The central shrine houses the image of Hara Saabha Vimochana Perumal in standing posture. The sanctum is approached through two halls, namely, the Garuda Mandapam and the Maha Mandapam. Kapala Moksha Pushkarani, located on the west side of the temple is the major water body associated with the temple, while the Mahabali Theertham is located opposite to it. The shrine of Kamalavalli Nachiyar, is located in the first precinct. The second precinct houses the shrines for Narasimha, Sudarshana, Andal, Alvars, and Vedanta Desika.

== Religious significance ==
The temple is revered in Nalayira Divya Prabandham, the 7th–9th century Vaishnava canon, by Thirumangai Alvar in ten hymns. The temple is classified as a Divya Desam, one of the 108 Vishnu temples that are mentioned in the book. The temple is one of the few historical temples in India where the images of Hindu Trimurti, Vishnu, Shiva and Brahma are housed in the same premises. It is one of the two temples in Chola Nadu where the Trimurti can be seen in the same premises, the other being Uttamar Kovil near Tiruchirapalli. The shrines of Brahma and his consort Saraswati were dilapidated during the course of time. The place is called by different names like Kandiyur, Kandana Kshetram and Pancha Kamala Kshetram, and is believed that devotees get relieved off their Brahmahatti Dosha after visiting the temple. The temple is considered older than Srirangam Ranganathaswamy temple and believed to be in existence from the Treta Yuga.
