= Kandiyur =

Coordinates: 10.851459°N 79.106867°E

- Village
- Location within Tamil Nadu Location within India
- Country: India
- State: Tamil Nadu
- District: Thanjavur
- Elevation: 49 m (161 ft)

Population (2011 census)
  - Total: 4,780

Languages
  - Official: Tamil
- Time zone: UTC+5:30 (IST)
- PIN: 613202
- Telephone code: 04362
- Website: www.tn.gov.in

Kandiyur, also referred to as Thirukkandiyur, is a village in the Thiruvaiyaru taluk of Thanjavur district, Tamil Nadu. Kandiyur is 3.7 km away from the block's headquarters and Thiruvaiyaru, a sacred place. The village is centered around Kandeeswarar temple, after which it is named.

== Demographics ==
The population of Kandiyur village is 4,780 as of the 2011 Census of India. The male population is 2,323 and the female population is 2,457. The literacy rate of the village is 88.22%.

== Transport ==
Thanjavur Junction Railway Station is 15 km away from Kandiyur village. Rameswaram Express and Tuticorin Express are some of the trains which connect Kandiyur to Chennai via Thanjavur. The state capital of Chennai is 340 km from Kandiyur.

- 24 hours transport service available in this village

== Notable places ==
Kandeeswarar Temple is a Hindu temple dedicated to the god Shiva. The temple is incarnated by the hymns of Tirugnana Sambandar and is classified as Paadal Petra Sthalam. It is the fifth of the seven sapthastanas of Aiyarappar temple at Tiruvaiyaru. It is notable for its sculptures which are built in Chola style. The temple is one of the seven shrines associated with the Saptamartrikas.

== See also ==
- Hara Saabha Vimocchana Perumal Temple
- Kandeeswarar Temple
