= Poornavalli Thayar =

Hindu goddess

Poornavalli Thayar is a Hindu figure. Poornavalli, also called "Poorva Devi", means "the one who filled the grail". Lakshmi is named as Poornavalli.

== Temple ==
She is the Mother goddess, worshiped in Uthamar Kovil (also known as Thirukkarambanoor or Bhikshandar Kovil) in Uthamar Kovil, a village in the outskirts of Tiruchirappalli in the South Indian state of Tamil Nadu, is dedicated to the Hindu gods Vishnu, Shiva, Brahma. Constructed in the Dravidian style of architecture, the temple is glorified in the Naalayira Divya Prabandham, the early medieval Tamil canon of the Alvar saints from the 6th–9th centuries CE. It is one of the 108 Divyadesams dedicated to Vishnu and Lakshmi, where Vishnu is worshiped as Purushottama Perumal and his consort Lakshmi as Poornavalli Thayar.

== Mythological history ==
The skull of Brahma was stuck in his (Shiva's) palm. Shiva used it as the begging bowl. While coming to this place (Bikshandar Kovil), Vishnu requested his consort Lakshmi to give alms to Shiva. Shiva's grail was filled by the alms and Lakshmi came to be known as "Poornavalli" (the one who filled the grail). She got rid of Shiva's hunger completely. Since Shiva came with a begging bowl and his hunger was entirely satisfied, he is known as Bikshandar.

Brahma and Shiva both had originally five heads. One day Brahma went to Kailasha. Parvati could not recognise Brahma; she was confused and concluded it was her husband "Shiva". Parvati started to perform Paadha Pooja (ablution of feet, considered as an act of respect). Brahma knew this fact, but he remained silent. On seeing this, Shiva understood that Parvati had no intention. Parvati was unaware that the one who stood before her was not Her lord, but it was Brahma. Enraged in anger, Shiva plucked the Brahma's fifth head, which resulted in Brahmahathi Dosha (the sin resulted due to the murder of an innocent Brahmana). The fifth head of Brahma stuck in Shiva's hand. Shiva wandered and visited temples to be relieved from the curse after being told by Sarasvati to do this in order to get relieved from this curse. To find salvation from the curse, Shiva went around the world on a pilgrimage begging for food, with Brahma’s skull as the begging vessel. Every time someone filled the vessel with food, it vanished immediately, to Shiva’s horror. At Uthamar Kovil, God Vishnu and Goddess Lakshmi filled the vessel with food, thus ending Shiva’s hunger. However, to Shiva’s dismay, Brahma’s skull still lay fixed on his hand. He was partly absolved of the sin at Bitchadanar Kovil. Vishnu instructed Shiva to worship Him (Vishnu) at Thirukandiyur after a bath in the temple tank. Shiva went to Thirukandiyur and did accordingly and was absolved of the sin. The temple tank, since then, has come to be known as Kapala Tirtha.

== Similarities to other figures ==
The Poornavalli Thayar satisfies Shiva's hunger. This legend is similar to Annapurna. Goddess Parvati was told by her consort God Shiva that the world is an illusion and that food is a part of this illusion called Māyā. The Divine Mother who is worshiped as the manifestation of all material things, including food, became angry. To demonstrate the importance of her manifestation of all that is material, she disappeared from the world. Her disappearance brought time to a standstill and the earth became barren. There was no food to be found anywhere, and all the beings suffered from the pangs of hunger.

Seeing all the suffering, Mother Parvati was filled with compassion and reappeared in Kashi and set up a kitchen. Hearing about her return, Shiva ran to her and presented his bowl in alms, saying, "Now I realize that the material world, like the spirit, cannot be dismissed as an illusion." Parvati smiled and fed Shiva with her own hands.

== See also ==
- Annapurna
- Uthamar Kovil
