= Brahmotsava =

Principal festival of a Hindu temple

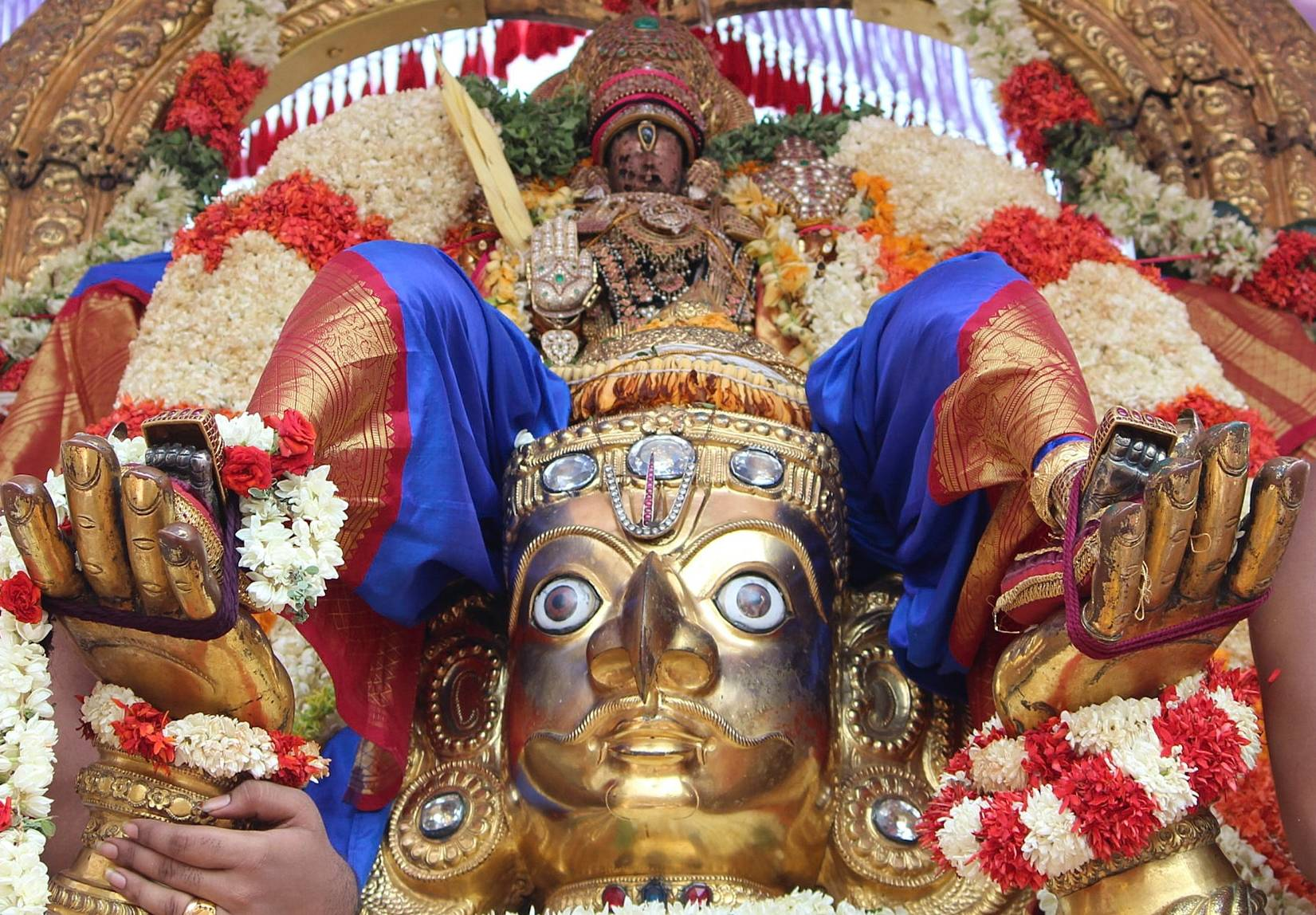
Garuda sevai, the procession of Vishnu upon Garuda, during a brahmotsava.

A brahmotsava (Sanskrit: ब्रह्मोत्सवम्, romanized: brahmōtsavam), also rendered mahotsava and tiruvila (Tamil: திருவிழா, romanized: tiruviḻā) is the principal festival of a Hindu temple.

Commonly held in South India, the murtis of a temple's deities are dressed in silk garments, decorated with ornaments, garlands, and other paraphernalia. They are carried from the sanctum to the streets upon palanquins or chariots by adherents, accompanied by musicians and crowds of devotees, who ritually venerate the deity. Brahmotsavas are held in a grand-scale in major temples of Tamil Nadu, such as the Ranganathaswamy Temple of Srirangam, the Nataraja Temple of Chidambaram, and the Meenakshi Temple of Madurai.

== Etymology ==
Literally meaning "the festival of Brahma", the creator deity is regarded to conduct the ceremony of this event.

== Description ==
The event is commonly classified into three categories based on duration: sāttvika (nine days), rājasa (seven days), and tāmasa (five days).

In Tamil Nadu, an annual brahmotsava festival occurs for a period of ten days.

On the final day of the festival, called the rathotsava, the festival image of the deity is slowly pulled through the streets in the performance of a chariot procession.

In the brahmotsava festival of Tirumala, Brahma is believed to have worshipped Venkateshvara. The rituals occur for a period of nine days.

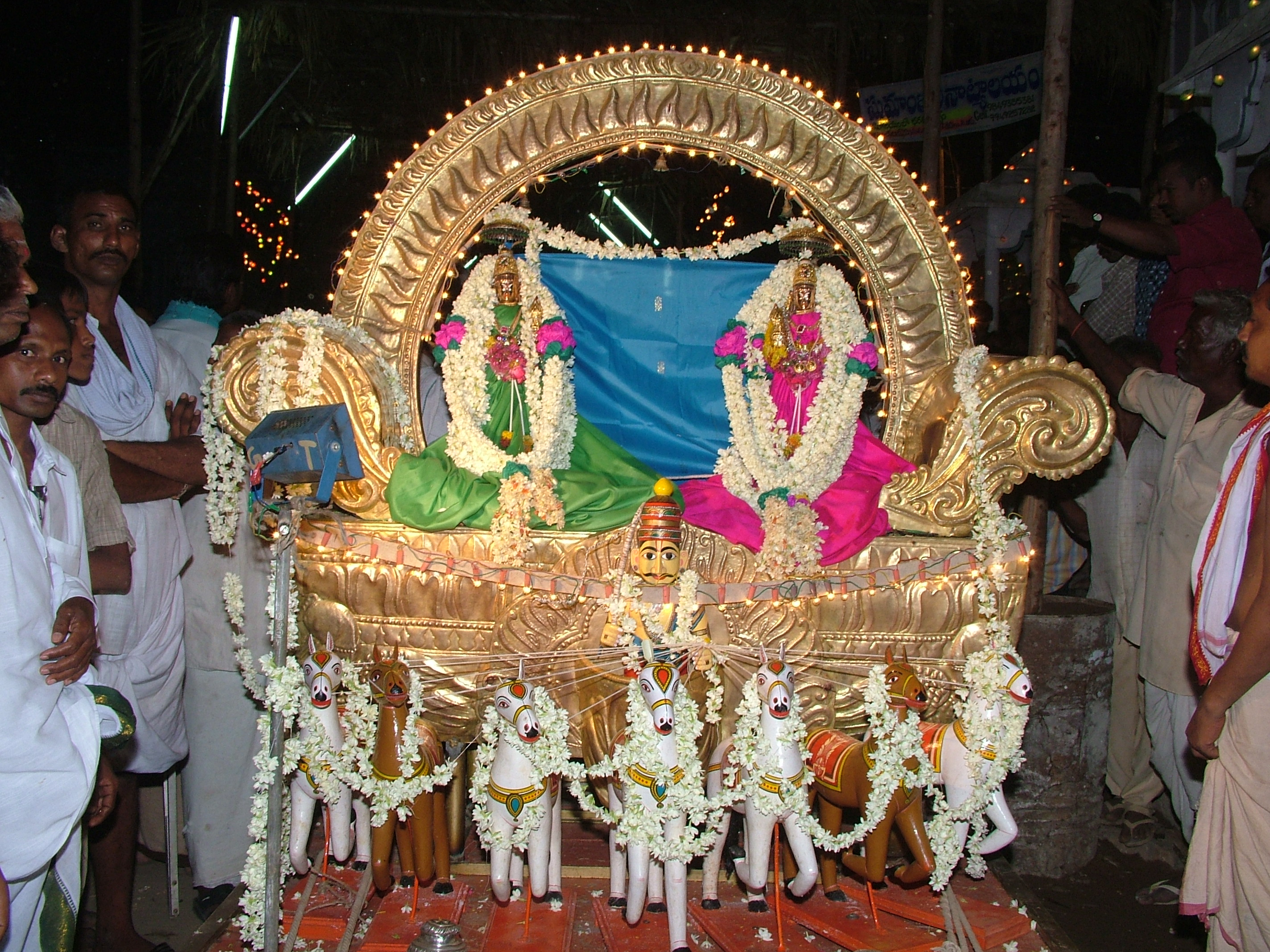
Festival images of Vishnu and Lakshmi during a brahmotsava.

=== Events ===
The ten-day events of the festival generally conform to the following ceremonies in the Shaiva tradition in Tamil Nadu; similar events with varying consorts and vahanas (mounts) are observed in the Vaishnava tradition:

1. Day 1: The dhvajarohana or the kodiyetral (flag-hoisting) ceremony is observed on the first day, in which the flag of Shiva is raised over the dhvajastambha (flagstaff) of the temple complex after the ritual performance by priests. The deity is regarded to offer a darshana (auspicious sight) to devotees under the sthala vriksha (temple tree).
2. Day 2: The festival image of the deity is placed on the mounts named Suryaprabha and Chandraprabha for a procession on the streets, an event that symbolises preservation.
3. Day 3: The festival image of the deity is placed on the mounts of Nandi and Bhuta for a procession on the streets, an event that symbolises dissolution.
4. Day 4: The festival image of the deity is placed on the mount of a naga for a procession on the streets, an event that symbolises obscuration.
5. Day 5: The festival image of the deity is placed on a car called the sapparam for a procession on the streets.
6. Day 6: The festival image of the deity is placed on an elephant for a procession on the streets.
7. Day 7: The tirukkalyanam, the ceremonial enactment of the wedding of Shiva and Parvati is performed.
8. Day 8: The festival image of the deity is carried in the deity's form of Bhikshatana.
9. Day 9: The ratha yatra (car festival) is performed, where the images of Shiva, his consort, and associated deities are carried for a procession on the streets, the highlight of the events.
10. Day 10: The festival images are carried back to the temple, and the weapon of the deity is offered a ritual bath. The flag erected on the first day is lowered, symbolising the end of the festival.

== Literature ==
The Mahabharata features a brahmotsava in the Virata Parva, in which a wrestling match is described between Bhima and a wrestler named Jimuta.
