= Bhikshatana =

Aspect of the Hindu god Shiva

- God of ascetics
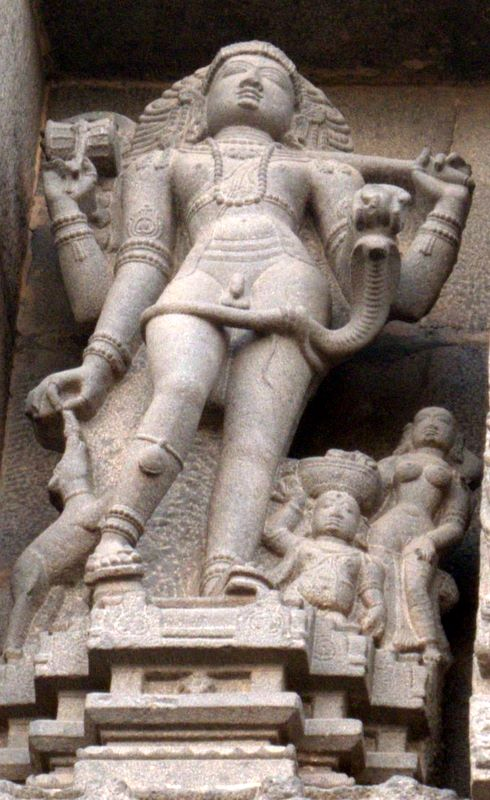
- Bhikshatana, Annamalaiyar Temple, Thiruvannamalai
- Devanagari: भिक्षाटन
- Sanskrit transliteration: Bhikṣāṭana
- Affiliation: Aspect of Shiva
- Weapon: Trishula
- Consort: Parvati

Bhikshatana (Sanskrit: भिक्षाटन; Bhikṣāṭana; literally, "wandering about for alms, mendicancy") or Bhikshatana-murti (Bhikṣāṭanamūrti) is an aspect of the Hindu god Shiva as the "Supreme mendicant" or the "Supreme Beggar". Bhikshtana is depicted as a nude four-armed man adorned with ornaments who holds a begging bowl in his hand and is followed by goblin attendants and love-sick women.

Bhikshatana is considered a gentler form of Shiva's fierce aspect Bhairava and a gentle phase between Bhairava's two gruesome forms, one of which decapitates one head of the four headed god Brahma and the other of which kills the god Vishnu's gatekeeper. Bhikshatana is the form of Bhairava that Shiva assumes to atone for his sin of severing Brahma's fifth head. He wanders the universe in the form of a naked Kapali mendicant, begging for alms with Brahma's kapala (skullcup) as his begging bowl, until his sin is expiated upon reaching the holy city of Varanasi.

Another legend describes Bhikshatana's visit to the Deodar (Pine) Forest to dispense the ignorance of sages and lead them to true knowledge. During his visit, he seduces the wives of the sages who come to give him alms. Horrified by Bhikshatana's "heretic" appearance and actions, the sages have a long confrontation with him. Ultimately Bhikshatana triumphs, establishing the worship of the Linga, his aniconic symbol. A variant of the legend narrates how Bhikshatana transforms into Nataraja—Shiva as the Cosmic Dancer.

Bhikshatana is a popular icon in South India, in contrast to North India, where it is of lesser importance. Though Bhikshatana does not have any temples dedicated to him as the primary deity, he is sculpted in stone temple walls, worshipped as a subsidiary deity, and cast in bronze as a temple festival processional icon in almost every major Tamil Shiva temple. Many Tamil language hymns sing of Bhikshatana's wanderings, often narrating of the pining of the love-smitten who are enamoured of him.

== Legends ==
=== Expiatory wandering ===
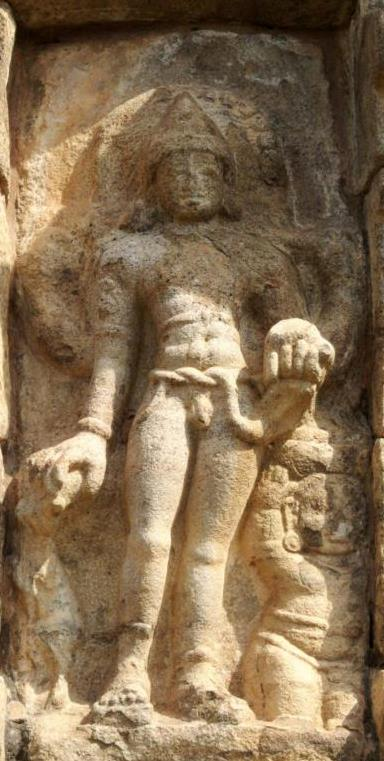
Bhikshatana, Gangaikonda Cholapuram Temple (1025 AD)

The Kurma Purana narrates that during a particular council of rishis (sages), the god Brahma arrogantly declared that he was the Supreme Creator of the Universe. Shiva appeared at the assembly as an infinite pillar of light and challenged Brahma's statement. After deliberation, the council accepted Shiva as the true Creator, but Brahma remained obstinate. Angered by Brahma's vanity, Shiva—as the terrifying Bhairava—cut off one head of the five-headed Brahma with a mere flick of his fingernail (an act iconographically depicted as Brahmashirascheda-murti). As a consequence Brahma died, but the spiritual credit he had accumulated over a lifetime of devout asceticism pulled him immediately back from death. Upon his resurrection, Brahma accepted Shiva's superiority. The reason for the decapitation of Brahma remains the same in the narratives of the Shiva Purana and the Matsya Purana. In the Skanda Purana, the trigger is not Brahma's arrogance but his incest with his daughter while in the Bengali version of the Shiva Purana, Brahma insults Shiva using his fifth head's mouth, while the rest of them praise Shiva when he comes to Brahma's abode as a guest. In another instance in the Shiva Purana, when an argument erupts between Brahma and Vishnu over who is superior, Shiva appears as an infinite fiery pillar (Linga) in front of the pair. They decide whoever finds the end of the pillar is superior. Brahma lies about finding the head of the infinite pillar and declares himself as superior. In the Varaha Purana, in which Shiva is born from Brahma's brow, Brahma calls his son a Kapali and angers him. In all versions, an infuriated Shiva or Bhairava cuts off Brahma's head as a punishment. However, all Puranas (Kurma, Varaha, Shiva, Skanda, and Vamana) agree that the head of Brahma stuck to Bhairava-Shiva's left palm due to the sin of killing Brahma, the most learned Brahmin – Brahmahatya or Brahminicide. To expiate the sin of brahmahatya, Shiva had to perform the vow of a Kapali: wandering the world as a naked beggar with the skull of the slain as his begging bowl. In the Kurma and Vamana Puranas, Shiva's sin takes corporeal form, becoming a ghoulish woman called Brahmahatya who follows Bhikshatana everywhere he goes.

The Kurma Purana further narrates that Bhikshatana wandered the three worlds (heaven, earth, and netherworld) begging from door to door with a host of bhutas (goblins). The women of the houses who came to grant him food became enamoured by his appearance and followed him, singing and dancing. Wandering, Bhikshatana reached the Deodar Forest (also called Daruka forest, Daruka-vana or Daru-vana), where he shocked the sages with his "lewdness and nudity" and tempted their wives. Bhikshatana-Shiva made them realise his greatness after their confrontation. However, in some other Puranas this encounter is placed in a different time period unrelated to Bhikshatana's expiatory wandering.

The Kurma Purana goes on to state that after the encounter with the sages of the Deodar Forest, Bhikshatana continued to wander, visiting various countries of gods and demons before he finally reached the abode of the god Vishnu. Vishnu's gatekeeper Vishvaksena did not allow him to enter. Angered, Bhikshatana slew Vishvaksena and impaled the corpse on his trident, which added to his sin. This form of Shiva with a corpse on his trident is called Kankala-murti ("One with the skeleton"). Bhikshatana, now as Kankala-murti, entered Vishnu's abode and begged for food. Vishnu offered his own blood as food in one version. In another version, Vishnu cut an artery on Bhikshatana's forehead; a stream of blood spurts into his begging bowl as his food. Vishnu then directed Bhikshatana to visit the sacred city of Varanasi, where his sin would be expiated. The encounter with Vishnu's gatekeeper is also retold with some variation in the Vamana Purana and the Matsya Purana.

All Puranas agree that upon reaching Varanasi, Brahma's skull falls off Bhikshatana's palm at a place now called Kapala-mochana ("liberating from the skull") and Vishaksena's corpse disappears. The sin, personified by Brahmahatya, vanishes into hell. Vishaksena is resurrected and the sanctified Bhairava-Shiva, having bathed in the sacred pond in Varanasi, casts off the appearance of Bhikshatana and returns to his abode.

=== Visit to the Deodar Forest ===
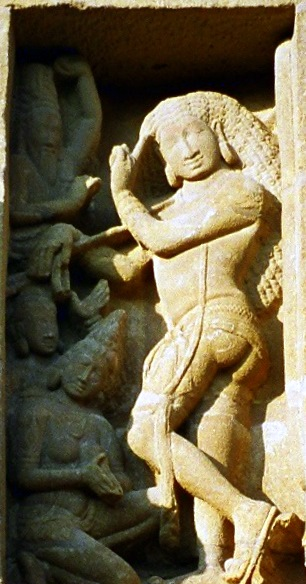
Bhikshtana, Kailashanatha temple, Kanchipuram. The young, nude Bhikshatana (right) holding a staff and with unwound hair is worshipped by women, who are seduced by him. An agitated sage (top left) raises his hand to hit Bhikshatana.

As told in the Kurma Purana, Bhikshatana-Shiva wanted to reveal the ignorance of the sages, who were engrossed in Dharma (righteousness) and extreme austerities but had forgotten the Samkhya (Supreme Knowledge). The naked, handsome, ithyphallic (with an erect phallus, urdhvalinga) beggar Shiva entered the forest, begging for alms from the sages' wives. They were so enamoured of him that while granting alms, they allowed their clothes to fall off and followed him, dancing and singing, love-sick. Bhikshatana was accompanied by Mohini—Vishnu disguised as Bhikshatana's enchanting wife, who maddens the sages' sons in love. The sages, unable to recognise Shiva, abused and cursed him, even assaulting him. They cursed that his Linga (phallus) should fall off. Shiva allowed it to be so and the Linga became an infinite fiery pillar of light. Anusuya, the wife of sage Atri, enlightened the sages that the couple was none other than Shiva and Vishnu. The sages thereafter worshipped the Linga. Pleased, Shiva returned to the forest as a beggar in an ugly form with his wife Parvati. Eventually, he revealed his supreme form to the sages and exalted the Pashupata vow – by which a man restrains his passion, becomes celibate, and roams naked smeared with ash – declaring that such a lifestyle would lead to moksha (salvation).

Other scriptures describe other visits by Shiva to Deodar Forest in his Bhikshatana form. The Vamana Purana mentions Shiva entering the Deodar Forest twice as a beggar. Maddened by the death of his first wife Sati but chased by the love-god Kamadeva, Shiva escapes to the Deodar Forest and lives as a mendicant. The sages' wives who come to grant him food become sexually excited at the mere sight of him. The sages curse his Linga to fall off and it becomes the infinite pillar. Brahma and Vishnu propitiate him and Shiva reabsorbs the Linga into his body. In another instance, while passing the Deodar Forest, Parvati notices sages who worship Shiva and have emaciated their bodies with fasts and severe vows. Parvati requests Shiva to save them from further pain, but Shiva declares that the sages are simply foolish and have not restrained their passion and anger. He enters the forest as a handsome man, wearing only a garland of sylvan flowers. He entices the sages' wives, who give him alms. As before, the Linga of the cursed Shiva falls off, but eventually the sages realise their folly and worship the Linga. Similar accounts of Bhikshatana-Shiva's visit to the Deodar Forest to humble and enlighten the false sages, Bhikshatana-Shiva's emasculation and establishment of Linga worship also appear in the Mahabharata, the Shiva Purana, and the Bhagavata Purana.

The Linga Purana also mentions the visit of Bhikshatana-Shiva to Deodar Forest to entice the wives of sages, who had taken up austerities "detrimental to the perpetuation of a healthy social order." The scripture mentions Bhikshatana-Shiva's deformed but attractive nude black-red form, his seduction of the sages' wives, and the sages' resulting curse. However, the curse proves fruitless in this version. The confused sages ask Brahma for guidance, who tells them the truth about the beggar and informs them of the proper way to propitiate Shiva. Returning to the forest, they please Shiva, who had returned to beg for alms. Finally, he enlightens the sages, revealing his true form. In the Padma Purana, the curse of the sages fails. In retribution, Shiva casts a curse on the sages so that they, like Bhikshatana, will become beggars with matted hair and be devoid of knowledge. Those who would still worship him would gain knowledge, wealth, and progeny, and be reborn into good families. In the Skanda Purana, the sages of the Deodar Forest are performing rituals and start to think of themselves as gods. To humble these arrogant sages, Shiva takes the form of Bhikshatana—an attractive young beggar—and Vishnu becomes Mohini, his wife. While the sages fall for Mohini, the women wildly chase Shiva. When the sages regain their senses, they perform a black magic sacrifice, which produces a serpent, a lion, an elephant (or tiger), and a dwarf, all of which attack Shiva, who overpowers them. Shiva then dances on the dwarf and takes the form of Nataraja, the Cosmic Dancer. The same legend is retold in the Tamil Kovil Puranam and Kandha Puranam with some differences. This legend is also told in the Sthala Purana related to the Chidambaram Temple dedicated to Shiva-Nataraja. The ceiling of the Shivakamasundari shrine in the Nataraja temple complex illustrates this legend in a series of frescos, where Bhikshatana is depicted as a white naked mendicant accompanied by a scantily-scad Mohini.

=== Kapaleshvara legend ===
The Skanda Purana narrates that Bhikshatana-Shiva appears on another occasion as a naked, fierce Kapali beggar. Once, at a sacrifice hosted by Brahma, Bhikshatana appears and begs for food. The Brahmins performing the sacrifice try to drive him away, considering a hungry beggar unfit for sacrificial rites. Bhikshatana throws his skull begging-bowl on the ground and the Brahmins throw it out, but another skull bowl appears in its place. Consequently, hundreds of skulls appear, polluting the sacrifice, which compels Brahma to promise Shiva that no sacrifice will be deemed complete without an invocation to him, Kapaleshvara—the Lord of the skulls.

== Iconography ==
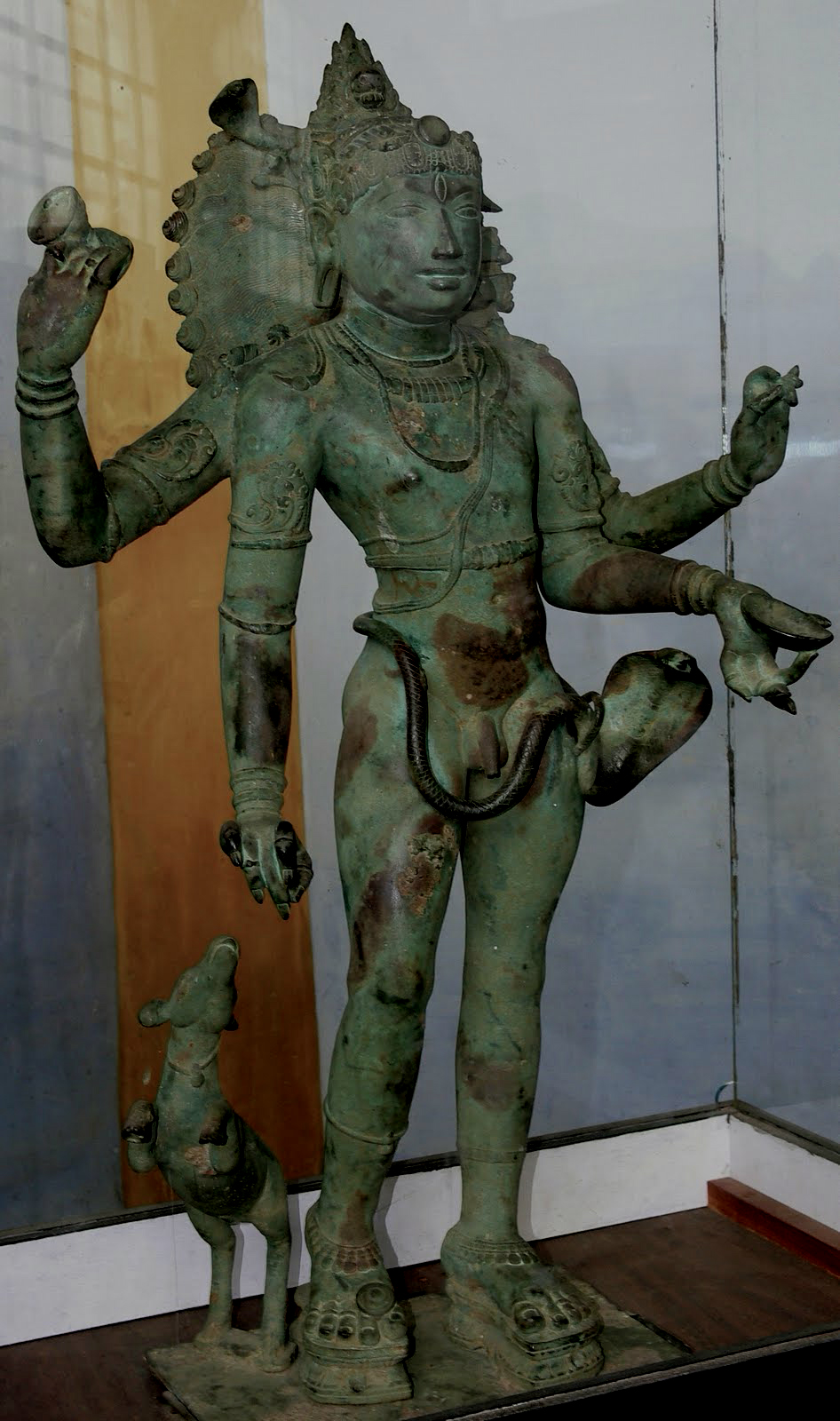
A 12th-century bronze Bhikshtana in the Nayak Palace Art Museum, Thanjavur. Like many other bronzes, the separately-cast trishula is missing from the hand.

The iconography of Bhikshatana is discussed in all Shaiva Agamic texts, including Amshumadbhedagama, Kamikagama, Supredagama, Karanagama and the iconographic work Shilparatna; the texts are mostly South Indian in origin. The iconography is quite similar to that of the Kankala-murti aspect who, like Bhikshatana, is associated with the legend of Shiva's atonement for severing Brahma's head. The chief difference is that Bhikshatana is nude and Kankala-murti is clothed.

Though Shiva is often described as a naked ascetic Yogi, iconographically he is rarely portrayed as nude except in his form as Bhikshatana. Often the seductive nature of the naked Bhikshatana is emphasised in his torso and buttocks. Though his manhood is fully visible, Bhikshatana is never displayed as ithyphallic in South Indian iconography. In contrast to textual descriptions, Odia images of Bhikshatana depict him clothed with tiger skin and other body ornaments, but displaying an erect phallus. He is two-armed, holding the begging bowl kapala in his left hand and the trishula (trident) in his right hand.

Bhikshatana is depicted with jatabhadra (dishevelled matted locks) or with jatamandala (matted hair arranged in a circle). A serpent may be depicted in his matted hair, which is also adorned by the crescent moon. His forehead bears a tripundara, the Shaiva tilaka composed of three horizontal lines of sacred ash with a red dot in the middle representing the third eye. He wears a patta (ornamental head band)—sometimes adorned with a human skull motif—on his forehead. Snake ornaments adorn his body, and bronze images often depict multiple necklaces, a waist-band, armlets, elbow bands, bracelets, anklets, and rings on all his toes and fingers. A snake is also tied around his waist and a white yagnopavita (sacred thread) is worn across the chest.

Bhikshatana is often pictured with four arms in South Indian iconography. The front right arm is stretched out downwards and the hand holds a bit of grass or another plant in the kataka gesture, near the mouth of his pet deer or antelope, who leaps playfully by his side. The back right arm is raised and holds a damaru (drum). The front left hand holds a kapala (skull-cup), used as a begging bowl. The back left hand holds a trishula decorated with peacock feathers. The left leg is firmly rooted in the ground while the right one is slightly bent, suggesting walking. He often wears paduka (wooden sandals) but sometimes may be barefoot. The sandals are unique and identifying feature of Bhikshatana's iconography and distinguish him from other forms of Shiva and all other deities, who are always depicted barefoot. Sometimes Bhikshatana's iconography is amalgamated with that of Bhairava, in which case he displays Bhairava's attributes in addition to his own.

One feature that does not appear in the canons but is often found in stone sculptures and bronzes is the presence of a small bell tied by a string just below the right knee. The bell is interpreted by the scholar Mahadev Chakravarti to be symbolic of Bhikshatana's outcast status, as the bell is symbolic of the Pariah "untouchables" of South India, who traditionally had to ring a bell when entering a Brahmin village. In bronzes, the deer and the trishula were generally cast separately and positioned later in the icon, but since many of these separate pieces have been lost over time, bronzes often appear without them.

Bhikshatana is often accompanied by women and bhuta-gana (goblin attendants of Shiva). One of the attendants placed to the left of Bhikshatana should carry a large bowl used for storing the food alms of Shiva. The women, often seven in number, are variously pictured as enamoured of Shiva, eager to embrace him, blessing him, or serving him food in his begging bowl with a ladle. The clothes of some of these women are slipping from their loins, symbolising their lust. The woman giving Bhikshatana alms is also interpreted as Annapurna, the goddess of grain. Various gods, celestial beings, and sages bow to him with folded hands. In some scenes, the sages are depicted as angry and trying to beat Bhikshatana, alluding to the Deodar Forest legend.

== Development and adoration ==
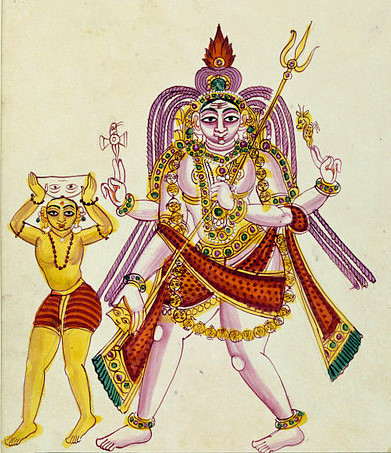
A 19th-century painting depicting Bhikshatana. Though the statue is nude, a strategically placed shawl hides the genitals.

The theme of Shiva as a beggar is not unique to the Bhikshatana icon and his legends. Shiva is often described as wandering the universe as a homeless beggar-ascetic with his consort Parvati's raison d'être being to bring him back to his marital and home life. Shiva is also depicted as asking for alms from the goddess Annapurna, a form of Parvati as the goddess of food. The Satarudriya describes Shiva as gathering food through begging, evocative of his Bhikshatana form. In spite of this he is described as a sustainer of the universe and of life-sustaining food.

Though Shiva is commonly described as a beggar, the specific theme of the expiatory wandering—which is the core of the Bhikshatana tale—originates uniquely from the ascetic traditions of the Kapalika sect and its precessor Pashupata sect. Bhikshatana mirrors the role of Kapali (skull-bearer), the wandering ascetic who defends himself with a trident and magical powers, holds a skull-bowl, and worships Shiva (the term Kapali also being used to designate a member of the Kapalika sect). Scriptures like the Kurma Purana explicitly identify Shiva with a Kapali – "an outsider who scares by his looks, and sometimes charms" – in this form. To atone for the sin of severing the god Brahma's fifth head, Shiva is said to have separated the body of Bhairava from his own and sent it to wander with the skull of Brahma in his hand, a vow that parallels the Maha-vrata ("great vow") that a Kapali must undertake to dispel the sin of accidentally killing a Brahmin. The expiatory wandering punishment of 12 years is also given to a Bhrunaghna sinner—a learned Brahmin who kills another of great learning and good conduct. The vow is prescribed in the Dharmashastras, a text corpus detailing ethics and conduct. The sinner should live in an isolated place and beg in only seven houses with the skull of the slain. He must use as a staff the bones of the slain and be treated by society as an outcast. Similarly, Bhikshtana is described as using Brahma's skull as his begging bowl and his bones as a stave. He wandered begging at the seven houses of the Saptarishi – the seven great sages – and lived in cremation grounds outside a town.

Images of Bhikshatana are found throughout Shaiva temples of South India, but are almost unknown in Northern India. Sculpted in stone adorning the temple walls of every other South Indian temple, images of Bhikshatana are also cast in bronze as processional icons. In South Indian temples, Bhikshatana is prescribed to be enshrined as an avarana-devata (a deity depicted on the circumambulatory path encircling the central shrine). Similarly in Orissan temples, Bhikshatana may be worshipped and depicted as parshva-devata (an attendant deity) or avarana-devata.

The iconography and mythology of Bhikshatana developed mostly in South India, as did that of another form of Shiva, Nataraja, who is related to Bhikshatana through his legends. However, unlike Nataraja, Bhikshatana is not related to specific temples, but has become "part of the mythological and festival-related traditions of all the major Tamil shrines". For instance, in Chidambaram (where a famous Nataraja temple stands), Bhikshatana is paraded in a golden chariot during the annual temple festival. In the Mylapore temple festival, the Bhikshatana icon is paraded in the streets along with four dogs signifying the Vedas and gana attendants. Shiva is described as sent by his consort Parvati (Karpagambal) to beg as he has lost her ring. Repentant for her harsh treatment of Bhikshatana and jealous of the glances of the women in the streets, who attracted are by his appearance, Parvati's icon rushes behind Bhikshatana and "dances" to win him back. Shiva relents and they travel together to the temple.

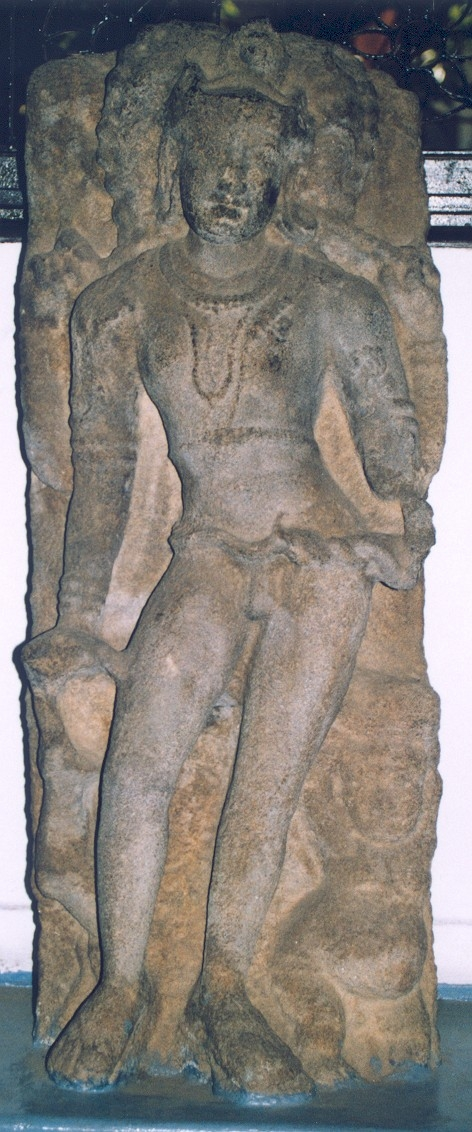
Bhikshatana, Government Museum, Chennai, originally from Bhikshandarkoil, Tiruchirappalli district. About 10th century AD.

Tamil works transform the terrible Kapali form of Shiva to a more lovable form. South Indian devotional literature portrays Bhikshatana in the Deodar Forest of the sages, but the Tevaram by the Nayanar poet-saints also describes rural women following him and calling out to him. Several poet-saints describe the sensuous nature of Bhikshatana and the love-sick emotions of the women who came to give him alms. However, the references to Shiva seeking alms had reduced to only three or four by the time of Manikkavacakar (9th century AD). The poems of Campantar, Appar, and Cuntarar focus on two forms of Shiva: Nataraja and Bhikshatana. The 7th-century Nayanar saint Campantar mentions that Bhikshatana wanders from door to door asking for alms with the beggar's call "Ladies, give me alms" and places his verses on the lips of women, who become enamoured of Bhikshatana. In a verse, Campantar rhetorically asks why the giver of all things and one who ends all troubles of devotees—Shiva—is wandering begging for food with a disgusting white skull. In another verse a woman comments on his strange appearance and describes how she is frightened by the serpent that wraps around his body when she approaches to give him alms. Another 7th-century Nayanar saint, Appar, talks about the handsome beggar Shiva, seducer of married women. He speaks of women allured by Bhikshatana's speech and his glance. The women tell that the handsome beggar wearing tiger-skin and smeared with ash had come riding a white bull and holding an axe, and used a skull as his begging bowl. Although he begged for alms, he would not accept any from the woman, deeming them "petty". He did however warn the women of deceptions and cunning. Appar adds a strong erotic element in most of his verses, where the women directly desire physical contact with Bhikshatana. A woman in Appar's poetry sings:

As he gazed at me
my garments slipped, I stood entranced,
I brought him alms
but nowhere did I see the Cunning One –
If I see him again
I shall press my body against his body
never let him go
that wanderer who lives in Ottiyur.

The 8th-century saint Cuntarar described Bhikshatana as having matted hair and skin smeared with ash, and wearing bark clothes and a tiger skin around his waist. He added that Bhikshatana would roam begging for food by day and dance at night in front of a fire, in company of his wife and several jackals.

In more recent times the poet Papanasam Sivan (1890–1973) composed four songs which describe Bhikshatana. In "Picchaikku Vandiro", Sivan wonders why Shiva roams as beggar and muses that it may be because Parvati is asking for jewels or his son Ganesha is asking for modak (sweets), or perhaps just to show the world that he looks fabulous, even as a mendicant. The "Saundarya Vellantanil" tells of a love-struck maiden describing Bhikshatana's beauty from head to toe and her longing for him.

== General references ==
- Dehejia, Vidya (2009). The Body Adorned: Dissolving Boundaries Between Sacred and Profane in India's Art. New York: Columbia University Press. ISBN 978-0-231-51266-4.
- Donaldson, Thomas E. (1986). "Bhikṣāṭanamūrti Images from Orissa". Artibus Asiae. 47 (1). Artibus Asiae Publishers: 51–66. doi:10.2307/3249979. JSTOR 3249979.
- Kramrisch, Stella (1981). The Presence of Siva. Princeton, NJ: Princeton University Press. ISBN 0-691-01930-4.
- Pal, Pratapaditya (1969). "South Indian Sculptures: A Reappraisal". Boston Museum Bulletin. 67 (350). Museum of Fine Arts, Boston: 151–173. JSTOR 4171519.
- Peterson, Indira Viswanathan (1991). Poems to Śiva: the Hymns of the Tamil Saints. Delhi: Motilal Banarsidass Publ. ISBN 81-208-0784-7.
- Rao, T. A. Gopinatha (1916). Elements of Hindu Iconography. Vol. 2: Part I. Madras: Law Printing House. OCLC 630452416.
- Smith, David (1996). The Dance of Siva: Religion, Art and Poetry in South India. Cambridge University Press. OCLC 199730334.
- von Stietencron, Heinrich (2005). Hindu Myth, Hindu History, Religion, Art, and Politics. Delhi: Orient Blackswan. ISBN 81-7824-122-6.
