= Vamana Purana =

One of eighteen major Puranas of Hindus

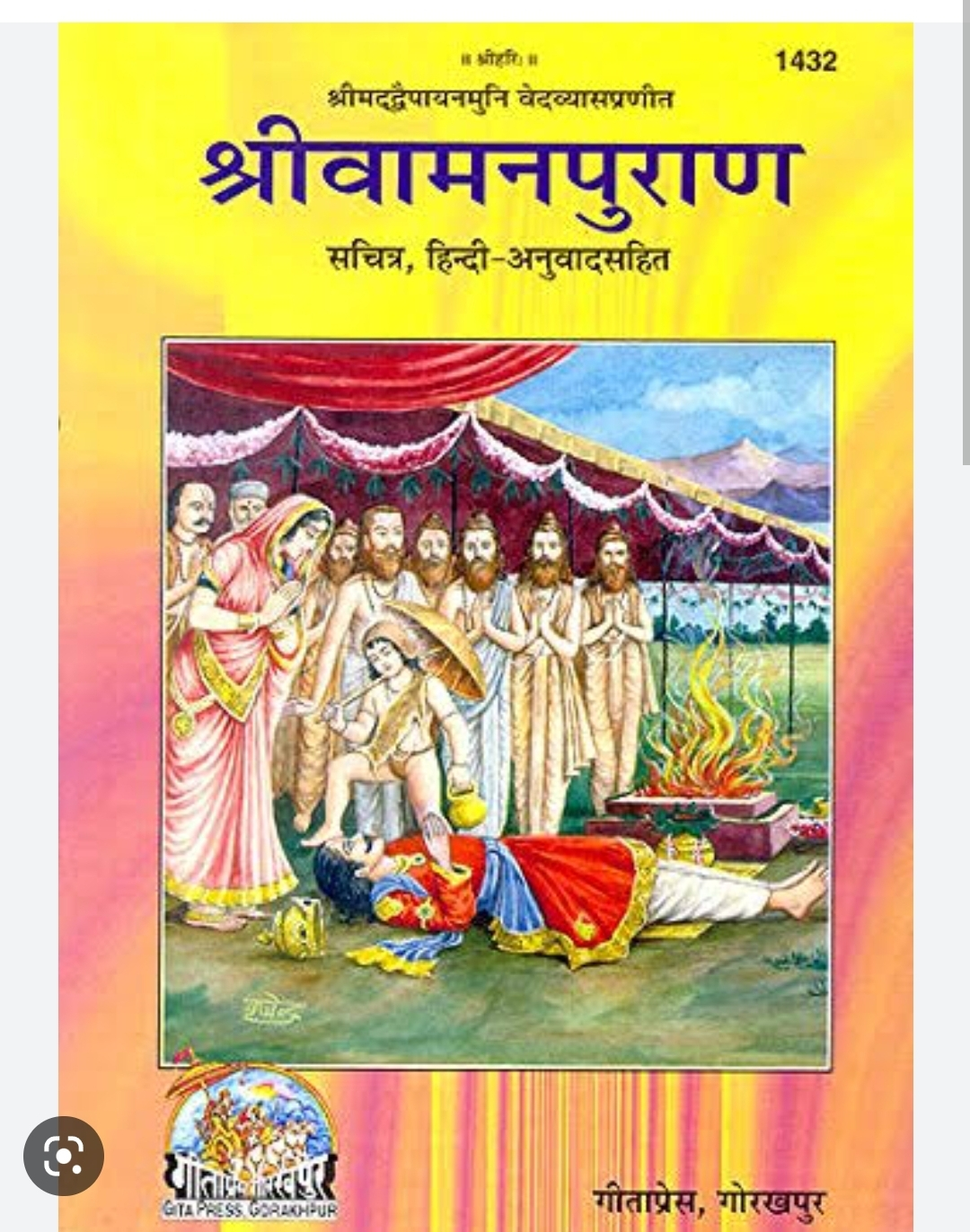
- Front Cover of Vamana Purana

Information
- Religion: Hinduism
- Author: Vyasa
- Language: Sanskrit
- Period: 9th-11th century CE
- Verses: 10,000

The Vamana Purana (Sanskrit: वामन पुराण, IAST: Vāmana Purāṇa), is an ancient Sanskrit text that is at least 1,000 years old and is one of the eighteen major Puranas of Hinduism. The text is named after one of the incarnations of Vishnu and probably was a Vaishnava text in its origin. However, the modern surviving manuscripts of Vamana Purana are more strongly centered on Shiva, while containing chapters that revere Vishnu and other Hindu gods and goddesses. It is considered a Shaiva text. Further, the text hardly has the character of a Purana, and is predominantly a collection of Mahatmyas (travel guides) (Note: Quote: "The earliest promotional works aimed at tourists from that era were called mahatmyas.") to many Shiva-related places in India with legends and mythology woven in.

The extant manuscripts of Vamana Purana exist in various versions, likely very different from the original, and show signs of revision over time and regions. It has been published by All India Kashiraj Trust in two rounds. The first round had 95 chapters, while the critical edition (edited by Anand Swarup Gupta, and published by the All-India Kashiraj Trust, Varanasi) published in the second round has 69 chapters plus an attached Saro-mahatmya with 28 chapters dedicated to temples and sacred sites in and around modern Haryana. Both these versions lack the Brhad-vamana with four samhitas, which is mentioned in the text, but is believed to have been lost to history.

The text is non-sectarian, and its first version was likely created by the 9th to 11th century CE.

== Content ==
The earliest core of the text has been dated variously between 450 CE - 900 CE, but most scholars favour the 9th to 11th century. The early printed editions of this work had 96 chapters, the new versions have 69 chapters with a supplement. The supplement were not found in some versions of manuscripts discovered in Bengal.

At the beginning (chapter 1), Narada asks Pulastya about the assumption of the Vamana avatar by Vishnu, which is his dwarf avatar. The text includes chapters glorifying Vishnu, but includes many more chapters glorifying Shiva. The text also glorifies various goddesses.

The text contains chapters on cosmology and mythology typical of a Purana. The text includes Saromahatmya, which is a 28 chapter guide to the tirthas, rivers and forests of the region around Thanesar and Kurukshetra in modern Haryana, as well as sites in modern eastern Punjab (India). The text also mentions geography and sites in South India.

== Bibliography ==
- Bailey, G. M. (1986). "For a new study of the Vāmana Purāna". Indo-Iranian Journal. 29 (1). Brill Academic: 1–16. doi:10.1163/000000086790082181.
- Bailey, Gregory (2003). Sharma, Arvind (ed.). The Study of Hinduism. University of South Carolina Press. ISBN 978-1-57003-449-7.
- Collins, Charles Dillard (1988). The Iconography and Ritual of Siva at Elephanta: On Life, Illumination, and Being. SUNY Press. ISBN 978-0-88706-773-0.
- Dalal, Rosen (2014). Hinduism: An Alphabetical Guide. Penguin. ISBN 978-8184752779.
- Dimmitt, Cornelia; Van Buitenen, J.A.B. (2012). Classical Hindu Mythology: A Reader in the Sanskrit Puranas. Temple University Press. ISBN 978-1-4399-0464-0.
- Gietz, K.P.; et al. (1992). Epic and Puranic Bibliography (Up to 1985) Annotated and with Indexes: Part I: A - R, Part II: S - Z, Indexes. Otto Harrassowitz Verlag. ISBN 978-3-447-03028-1.
- Glucklich, Ariel (2008). The Strides of Vishnu: Hindu Culture in Historical Perspective: Hindu Culture in Historical Perspective. Oxford University Press. ISBN 978-0-19-971825-2.
- Hazra, Rajendra Chandra (1987) [1940]. Studies in the Puranic Records on Hindu Rites and Customs. Motilal Banarsidass. ISBN 978-81-208-0422-7.
- Kramrisch, Stella (1976). The Hindu Temple, Volume 1 & 2. Motilal Banarsidass. ISBN 81-208-0223-3.
- Rocher, Ludo (1986). The Purāṇas. Wiesbaden: Otto Harrassowitz Verlag. ISBN 3-447-02522-0.
- Wilson, H. H. (1864). The Vishnu Purana: A System of Hindu Mythology and Tradition (Volume 1: Introduction, Book I). Read Country Books (reprinted in 2006). ISBN 1-84664-664-2.
- Winternitz, M. (1927). A History of Indian Literature. Vol. 1. Translated by Ketkar, S. University of Calcutta.
