= Kurma Purana =

Medieval era Sanskrit text, one of eighteen major Puranas

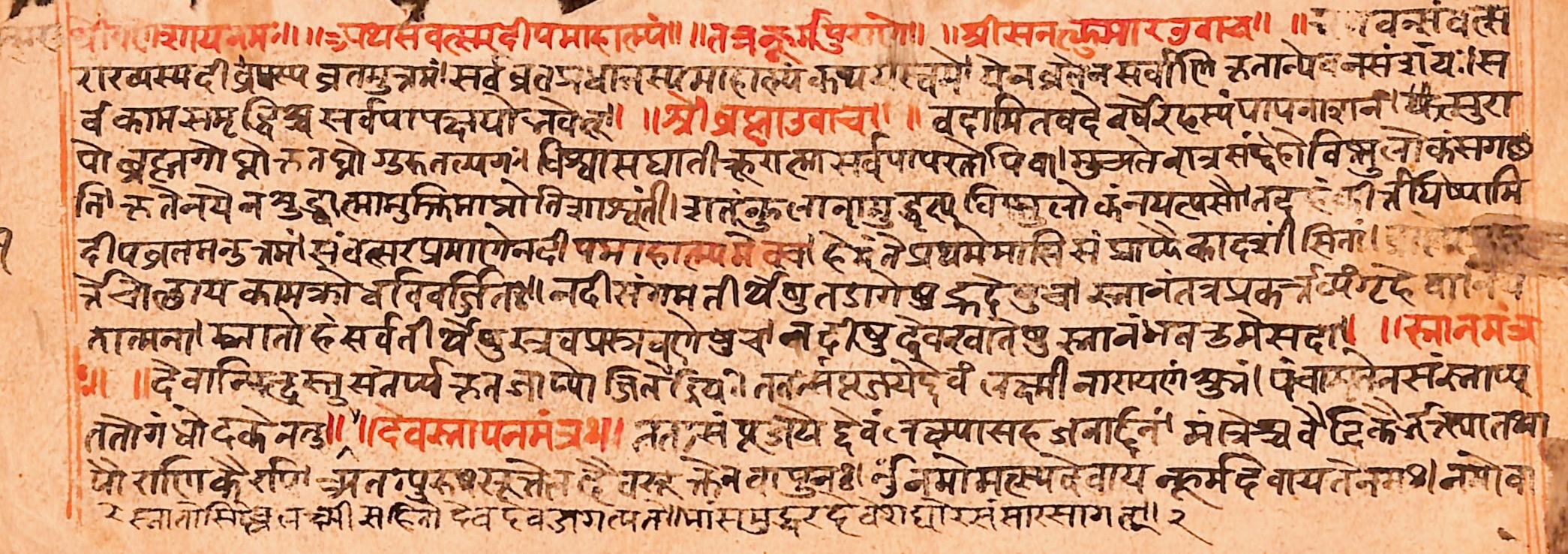
A page from the Kurma Purana (Sanskrit, Devanagari)

The Kurma Purana (IAST: Kūrma Purāṇa) is one of the eighteen Mahapurana, and a medieval era text of Hinduism. The text is named after the tortoise avatar of Vishnu.

The manuscripts of Kurma Purana have survived into the modern era in many versions. The number of chapters vary with regional manuscripts, and the critical edition (edited by Anand Swarup Gupta, and published by the All-India Kashiraj Trust, Varanasi) of the Kurma Purana has 95 chapters. Tradition believes that the Kurma Purana text had 17,000 verses, the extant manuscripts have about 6,000 verses.

The text, states Ludo Rocher, is the most interesting of all the Puranas in its discussion of religious ideas, because while it is a Vaishnavism text, Vishnu does not dominate the text. Instead, the text covers and expresses reverence for Vishnu, Shiva and Shakti with equal enthusiasm. The Kurma Purana, like other Puranas, includes legends, mythology, geography, Tirtha (pilgrimage), theology and a philosophical Gita. The notable aspect of its Gita, also called the Ishvaragita, is that it is Shiva who presents ideas similar to those found in the Bhagavad Gita.

== Date ==
The date proposed for the composition of the extant Kurma Purana is the beginning of the 8th century A.D.

The Kurma Purana, like all Puranas, has a complicated chronology. Dimmitt and van Buitenen state that each of the Puranas is encyclopedic in style, and it is difficult to ascertain when, where, why and by whom these were written:

As they exist today, the Puranas are a stratified literature. Each titled work consists of material that has grown by numerous accretions in successive historical eras. Thus no Purana has a single date of composition. [...] It is as if they were libraries to which new volumes have been continuously added, not necessarily at the end of the shelf, but randomly.

— Cornelia Dimmitt and J.A.B. van Buitenen, Classical Hindu Mythology: A Reader in the Sanskrit Puranas

== Structure ==
The Kurma Purana exists in many versions, but all of them consist of two parts—the Purva-vibhaga (older part) and Upari-vibhaga (upper part). The number of chapters vary with the manuscripts. The critical edition of the different manuscripts contains fifty one chapters in Purva-vibhaga and forty four in Upari-vibhaga.

== Contents ==
Kurma is, states Rocher, the most interesting religion-themed Purana, because even though it is named after one of the Vishnu avatar, it contains a combination of Vishnu and Shiva related legends, mythology, Tirtha (pilgrimage) and theology. The stories are similar to those found in the other Puranas, but neither Vishnu nor Shiva dominate the text. The text presents a tour guide to medieval Varanasi (also known as the holy city of Banaras or Kashi), but mostly about the Shaiva sites, while elsewhere Pancharatra stories present Vishnu prominently but with Sri as the Supreme Shakti who is energy and power of all gods including Vishnu, Shiva, Brahma.

The Kurma Purana, like other Puranas, includes a philosophical Gita. It is titled Ishvaragita, and its eleven chapters are an adaptation of Bhagavad Gita in a Shiva-as-spokesman format. These eleven chapters are in the Uttaravibhāga.

The Ishvara-gita borrows and refers to the Upanishads such as the Katha Upanishad and Shvetashvatara Upanishad. It presents yoga and vrata like the Bhagavad Gita, but as a discourse from Shiva. The discourse begins after Vishnu and Shiva embrace each other, according to the text, and then Vishnu invites Shiva to explain the nature of the world, life and self. Shiva explains Atman (soul, self), Brahman-Purusha, Prakriti, Maya, Yoga and Moksha. The philosophical theme, states Rocher is built on Advaita Vedanta ideas, that is emphasizing the identity of the Atman (individual soul) and the Ultimate Reality concept of Brahman. The text is notable for asserting that anyone from any varna can achieve liberation through Bhakti yoga.

The Nārada Purāṇa (I.106. 1-22) gives a brief overview of the sections of the Kurma Purana, along with summaries of other Puranas.
