= Bhairava Ashtami =

Hindu religious occasion

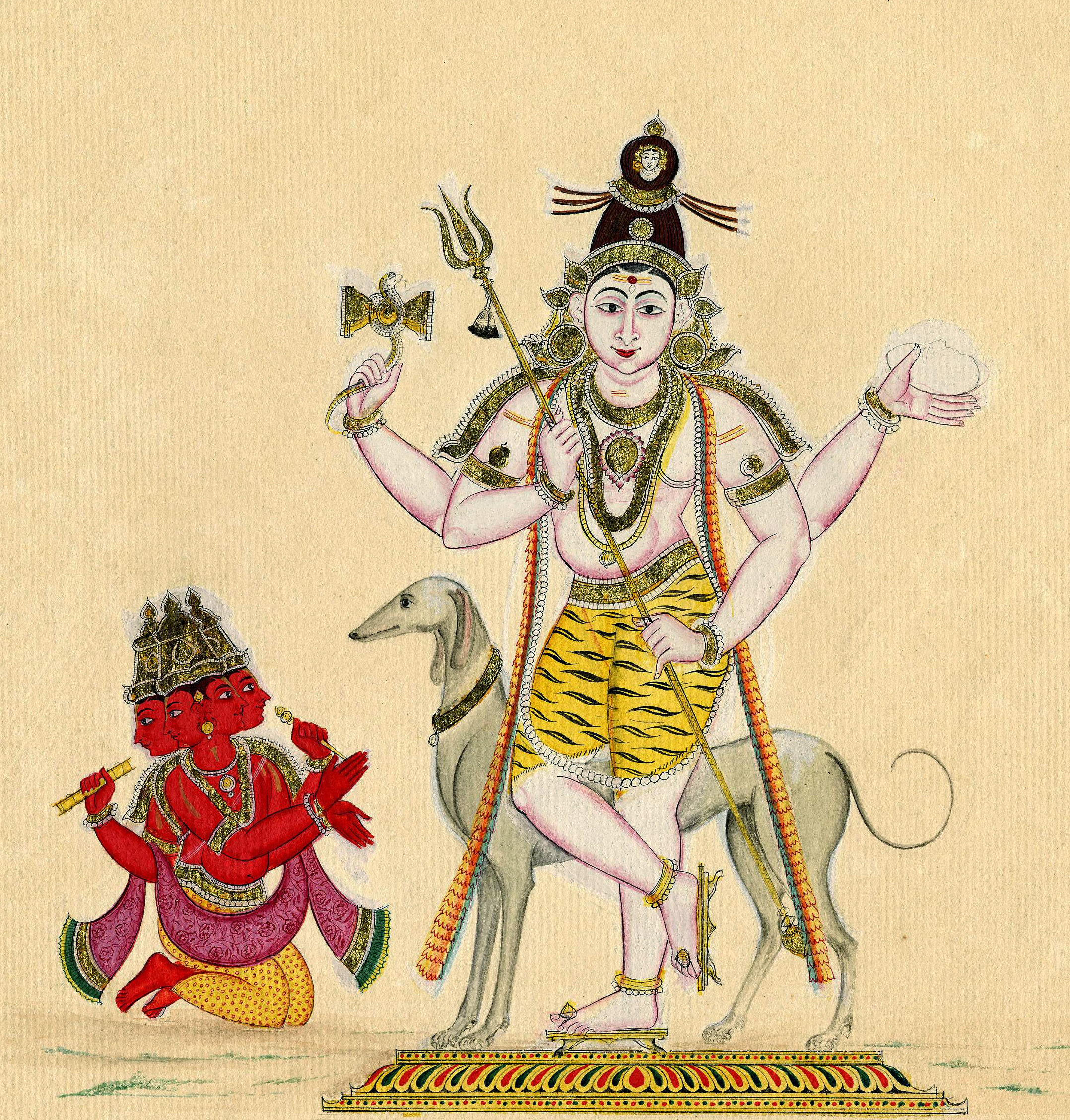
- Painting of Brahma worshipping Bhairava
- Also called: Bhairava Jayanti
- Observed by: Hindus
- Type: Hindu
- Observances: Prayers and religious rituals, including puja to the deity Bhairava
- Date: Dark half of the lunar calendar month of Kartika/Margashirsha
- 2025 date: Friday, 12 December
- Frequency: annual

Bhairava Ashtami (Sanskrit: भैरवाष्टमी, romanized: Bhairavāṣṭamī), also known as Bhairavashtami, Bhairava Jayanti, Kala-Ashtami and Kala-Bhairava Jayanti is a Hindu holy day commemorating the manifestation of the deity Bhairava, a fearsome and wrathful manifestation of the god Shiva. It falls on the eighth lunar day (ashtami) in the fortnight of the waning moon (Krishna paksha) in the Hindu month of Kartika (per the South Indian Amavasyant calendar, every month ends with a new moon) or Margashirsha (per the North Indian Purnimant calendar, every month ends with a full moon). By both schemes, Bhairava Ashtami falls on the same day in November–December-January. The name Kalashtami is sometimes used to refer to this day, but might also refer to any ashtami in Krishna paksha, all of which are days sacred to Bhairava.

== Legend ==
Bhairava is a manifestation of Shiva's wrath. According to the Shiva Purana, the deities Brahma and Vishnu engaged in a debate regarding their superiority over each other. When Brahma resorted to dishonesty and proclaimed his victory over Vishnu, Shiva appeared and created Bhairava, who cut off one of Brahma's five heads. Brahma begged forgiveness from Shiva for his dishonesty, and he and Vishnu engaged in the worship of Shiva in the form of a lingam.

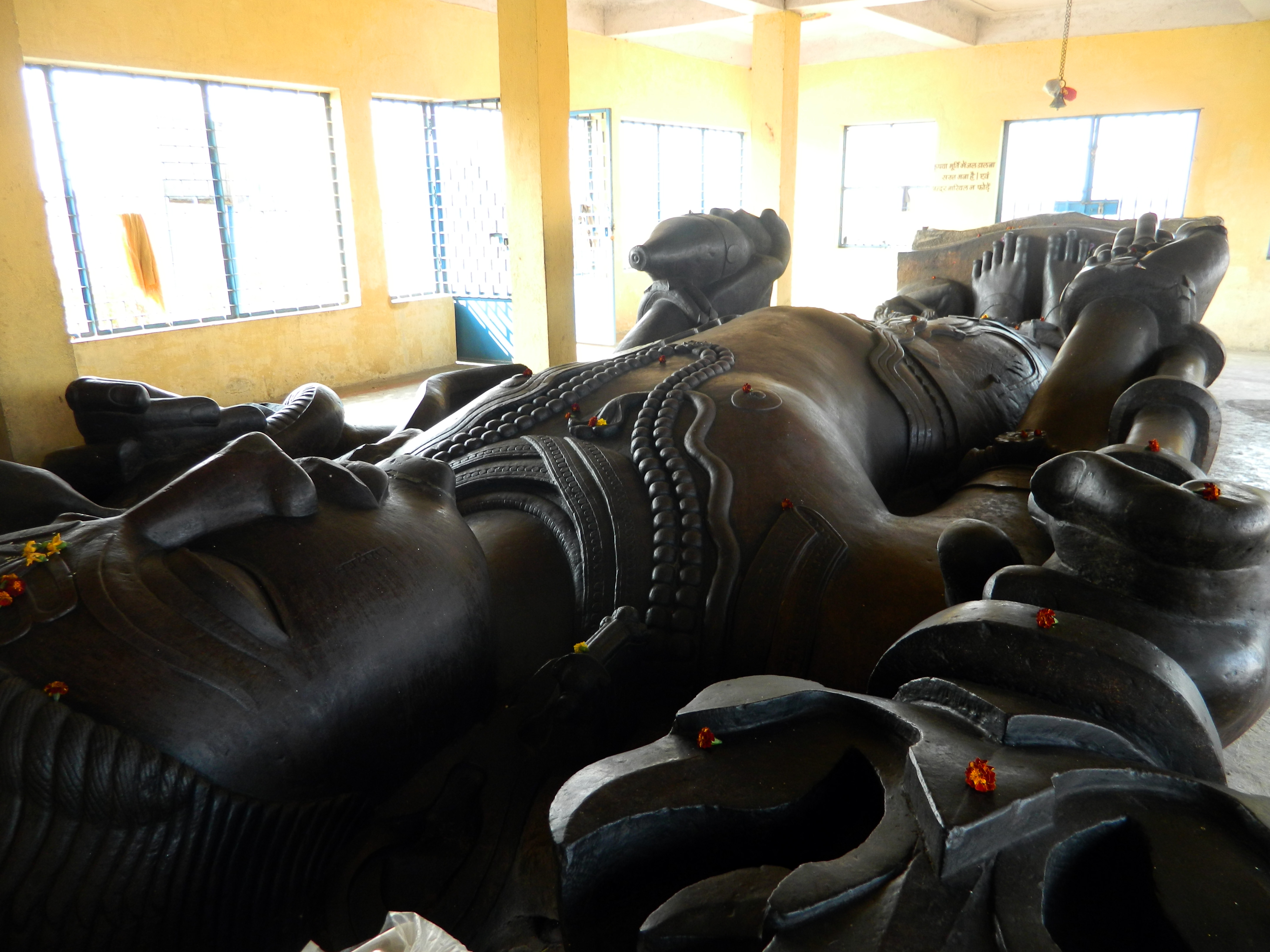
Shiva temple in Gudh, in Rewa, Madhya Pradesh, which has this sacred and rare, 10th or 11th century, reclining idol of Bhairava.

The head of Brahma was stuck to Bhairava's left palm due to the sin of killing Brahma, the most learned Brahmin, called Brahmahatya or Brahminicide. To expiate the sin of Brahmahatya, Bhairava had to perform the vow of a Kapali: wandering the world as a Bhikshatana with the skull of the slain as his begging bowl. Bhairava's sin was finally expiated when he reached the holy city of Varanasi, where a temple dedicated to him still exists.

In regional tradition, Shiva as Bhairava is considered to have been entrusted with the task of maintaining law and discipline amongst Hindus, as pertaining to their salvation in the city of Varanasi, where the last rites of Hindus are performed in the holy river Ganges, with accountability of their sins and good deeds.

== Practices ==
An all-night vigil is observed on Bhairava Ashtami with prayers, worship and tales of Bhairava, Shiva and Parvati being told. In the midnight, an arati of Bhairava should be performed with conches, bells and drums. After taking a bath in the morning, devotees, especially Shiva-worshipping Shaivas offer libations and oblations to their dead ancestors. Then, Bhairava, Shiva, Shiva's consort Parvati and Bhairava's vahana (animal vehicle), the dog, is worshipped with flowers and sweets. Dogs are also offered milk, sweets, curds and other food as offerings.

The day is considered holier if Bhairava Ashtami falls on a Sunday or a Tuesday, sacred weekdays dedicated to Bhairava. Bhairava is specifically worshipped for success, wealth, health and obstacle removal. A devotee is said to be freed of sin and the fear of death by observing Bhairava Ashtami.

Bhairava Ashtami is observed in Bhairav Prasad Temple in Vaishno Devi hills in Kashmir. On this day, an image of Kala-Bhairava is made in gold or silver and immersed in a brass metal pot filled with water and worshipped with all scriptural prayers, as is done to Shiva. Then, the priests who do the puja are offered gifts.

In Varanasi, an eight-day pilgrimage of the eight temples dedicated to Ashta Bhairava, eight subsidiary aspects of Bhairava, is undertaken on the first eight days of the fortnight, culminating with Bhairava Ashtami. On Bhairava Ashtami, Kala Bhairava, the city's guardian deity, is worshipped in his temple. For the rest of a year, a cloth covers the central icon, except his face, however on this day, the cloth is removed to reveal the whole image. The image is adorned with a garland of silver skulls on this day. Several devotees flood the temple to capture the unique opportunity to view the whole image.
