= Bhairava =

Hindu deity

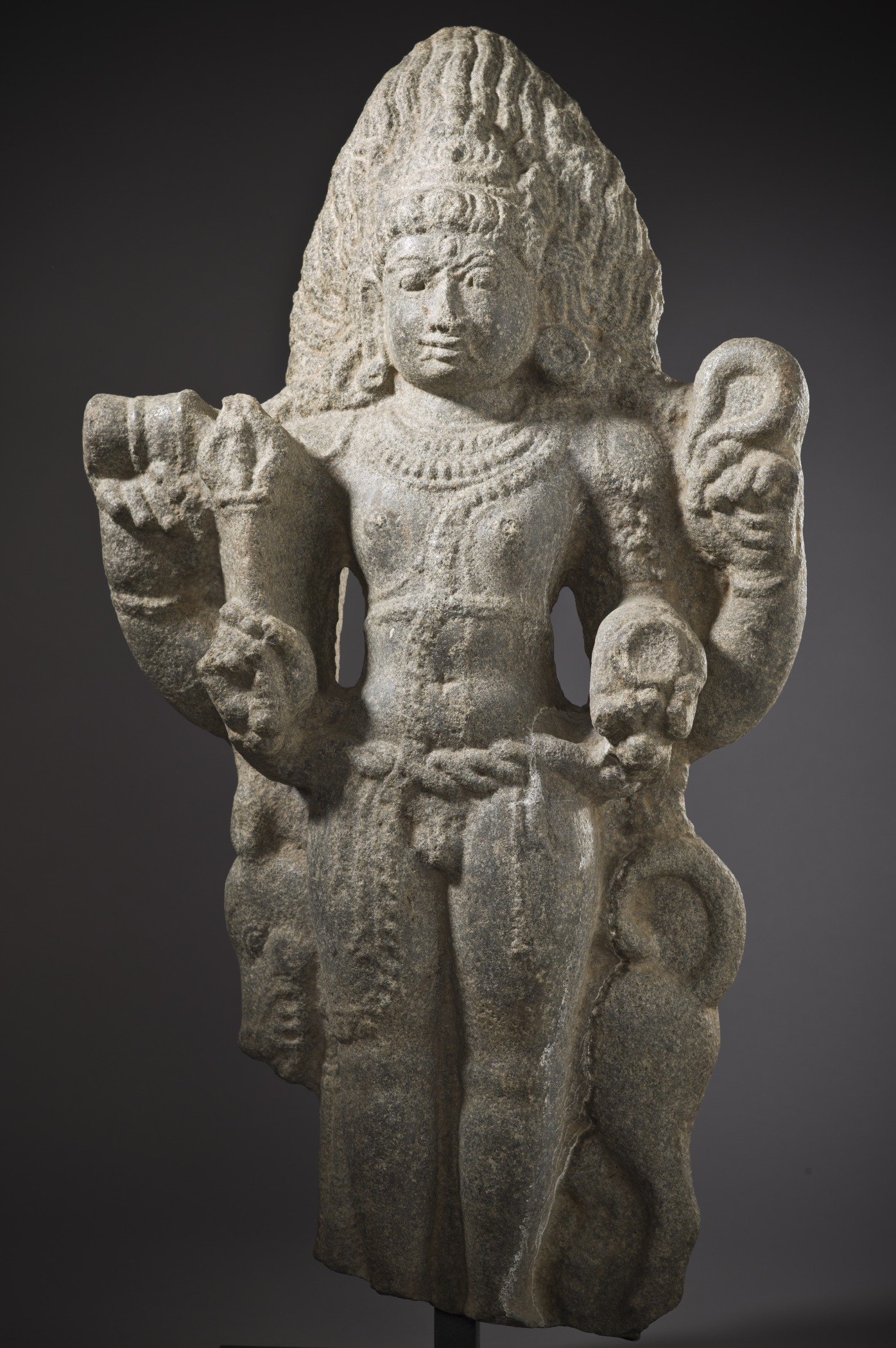
- South Indian depiction of Bhairava riding on his vahana (dog), 13th century, Chola Dynasty, Tamil Nadu
- Other names: Āmardaka, Kālarāja, Nīlalohita, Kāpālin, Mahākāla, Kālāgni
- Affiliation: Shiva
- Mantra: Oṁ bham Bhairavāya Namaḥ
- Weapon: Trishula, Khaṭvāṅga, Sword, Kapala, Sickle, Vajra, Noose, Pinaka bow, Pashupatastra arrow, Pestle and Damaru
- Day: Monday, Tuesday, or Sunday
- Number: 33
- Mount: Dog
- Festivals: Bhairava Ashtami
- Consort: Bhairavi, Kali

Bhairava (Sanskrit: भैरव, lit. 'frightful'), or Kāla Bhairava, is a Shaivite and Vajrayāna deity worshipped by Hindus and Buddhists. In Shaivism, he is a powerful manifestation, or avatar, of Shiva. In the tradition of Kashmir Shaivism, Bhairava represents the Supreme Reality, synonymous to Para Brahman. Generally in Hinduism, Bhairava is also called Daṇḍapāni ("he who holds the daṇḍa in his hand"), as he holds a rod or danda to punish sinners, and Śvāśva, meaning, "he whose vehicle is a dog". In Vajrayana Buddhism, he is considered a fierce emanation of bodhisattva Mañjuśrī, and also called Heruka, Vajrabhairava, Mahākāla and Yamantaka.

Bhairava is worshipped throughout India, Nepal, Indonesia, Sri Lanka, and Japan, as well as in Tibetan Buddhism.

== Etymology ==
Bhairava originates from the word bhīru, which means "fearsome". Bhairava means "terribly fearsome form". It is also known as one who destroys fear or one who is beyond fear.

== Hinduism ==
=== Legend ===
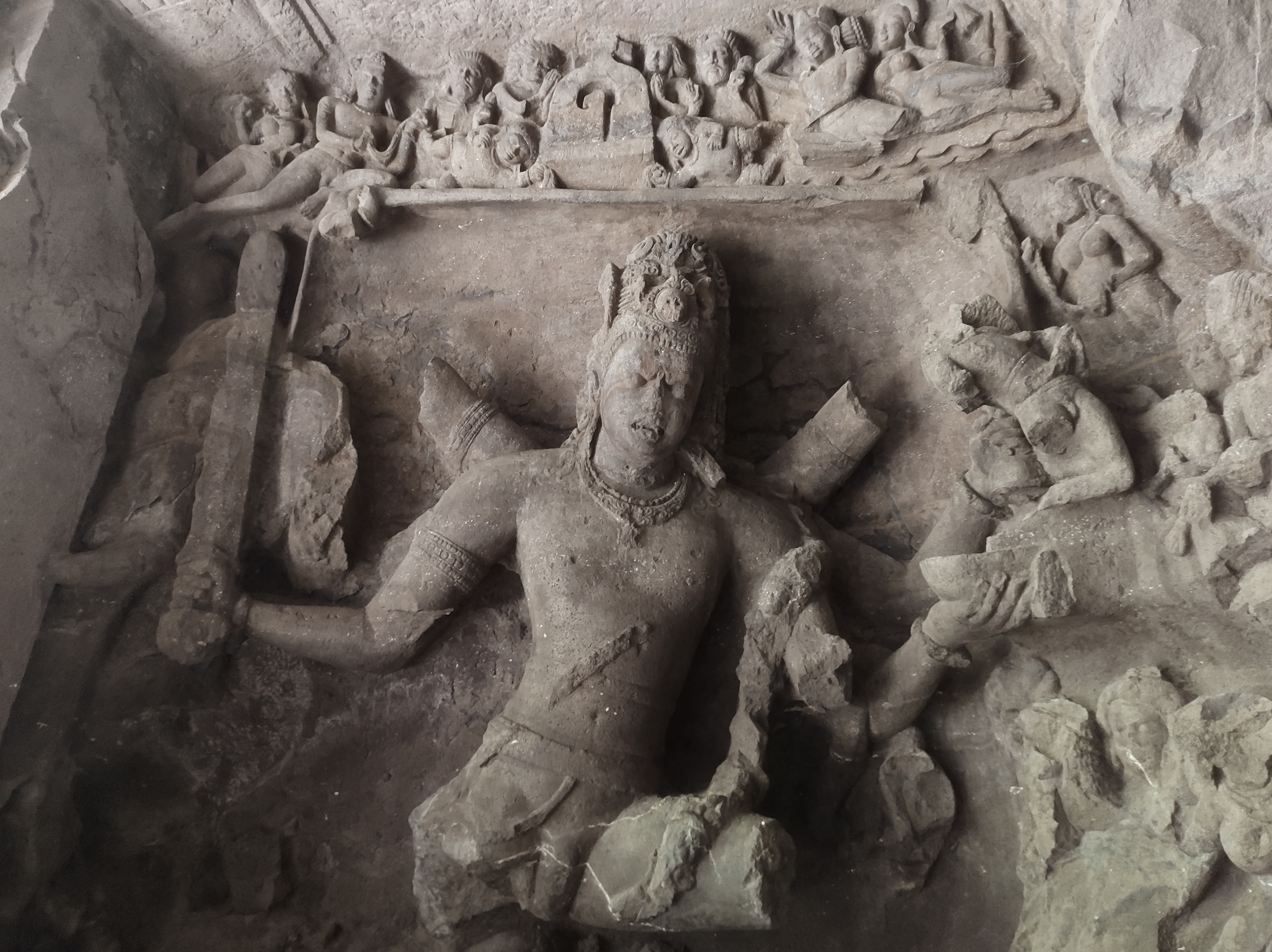
Bhairava depicted in Elephanta Caves, mid-5th century

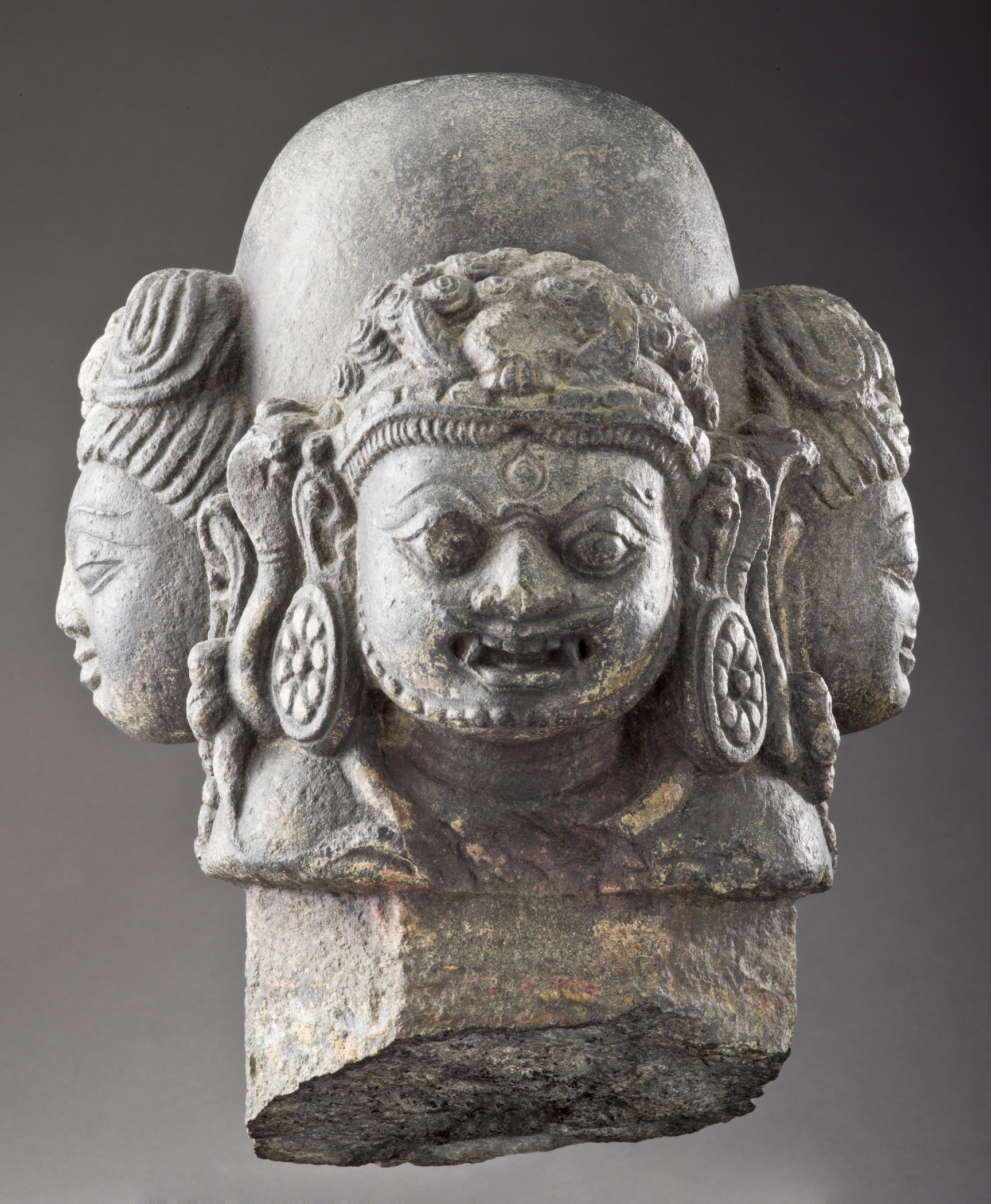
Mahakala Bhairava depicted on a chaturmukha (four-faced) lingam, 10th century

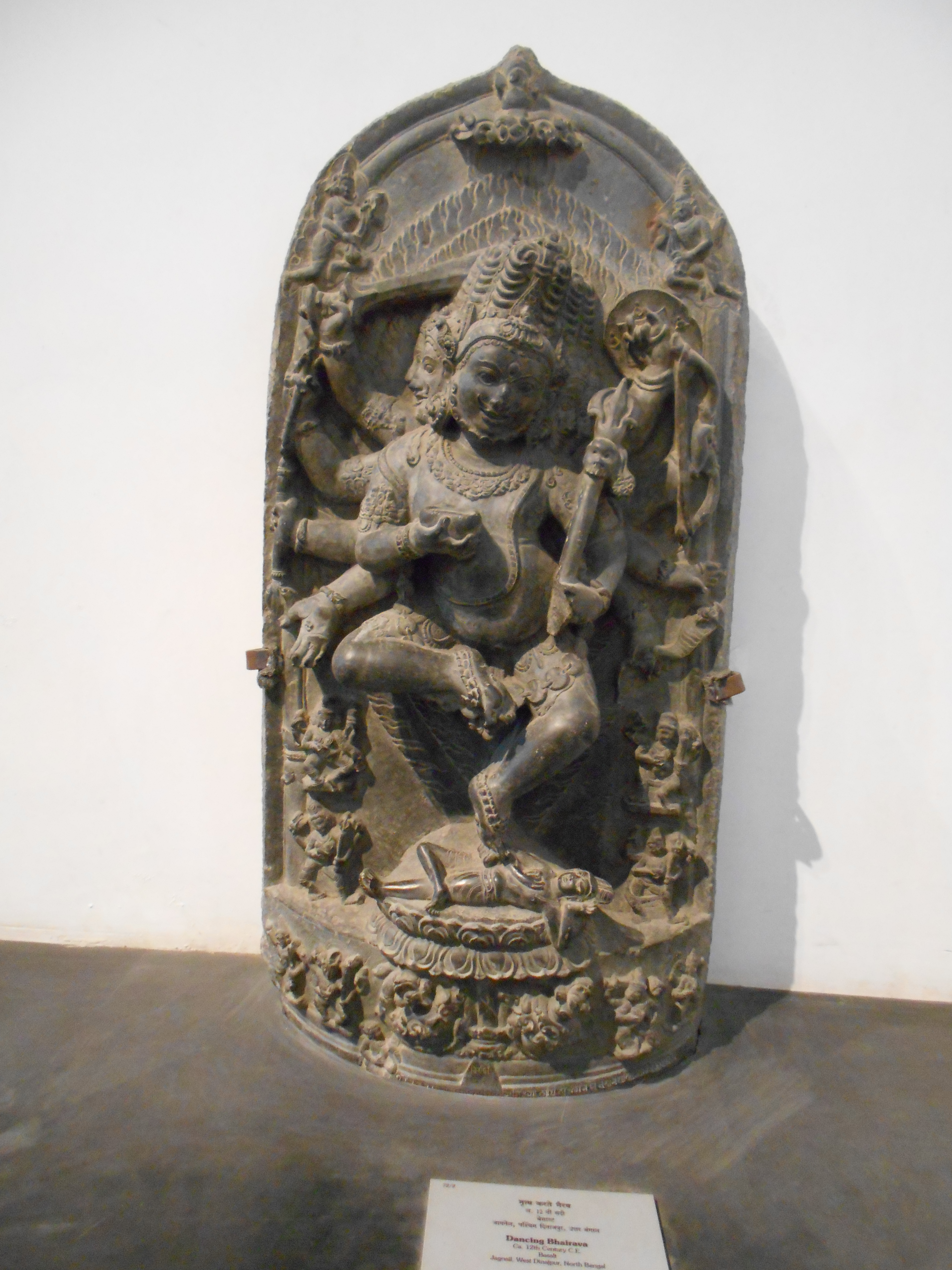
Dancing Bhairava, Bengal, 12th century

The legend of the origin of Bhairava is traced back to a conversation between Brahma and Vishnu described in the Shiva Purana.

Shiva manifested as a pillar of light to settle the dispute of superiority between Brahma and Vishnu. Brahma dishonestly proclaimed his victory, stating that he had discovered the higher end of the pillar of light. To punish him for his dishonesty and arrogance, Shiva produced Bhairava from the region between his brows. When Bhairava sought instruction from Shiva, the deity directed him to "worship Brahma with his sharp-pointed quick-moving sword". Bhairava decapitated the fifth head of Brahma for uttering the falsehood. Vishnu interceded on Brahma's behalf and sought mercy, and the two deities then worshipped Shiva.

Having committed the sin of brahmahatya (the murder of a Brahmin) by decapitating Brahma, Bhairava was pursued by one of the five greatest sins (maha patakas). The skull of Brahma was still attached to his hand. To expiate himself of the sin, Bhairava roamed the three worlds. He visited Vaikuntha, where he was honoured by Vishnu and Lakshmi. When Bhairava visited Kashi, the city of the liberated, Brahmahatya left him, and the skull of Brahma was released from his hand.

In another legend, Brahma is regarded to have stated to Vishnu to worship him as the supreme creator of the universe. Noting that both Shiva and he had five heads, Brahma came to believe that he was identical to Shiva and was equal to his powers. When his arrogance started to affect his role in the universe, Shiva threw a lock of his hair from his head. This assumed the form of Bhairava, who decapitated one of Brahma's heads. When the skull (kapala) of Brahma was held in the hand of Bhairava, the creator deity's ego was destroyed and he became enlightened. In the form of Bhairava, Shiva is said to guard each of the Shakta pithas, a group of temples dedicated to Shakti. Each Shakta pitha is accompanied by a temple dedicated to Bhairava, except Kamakhya Temple.

=== Depiction ===
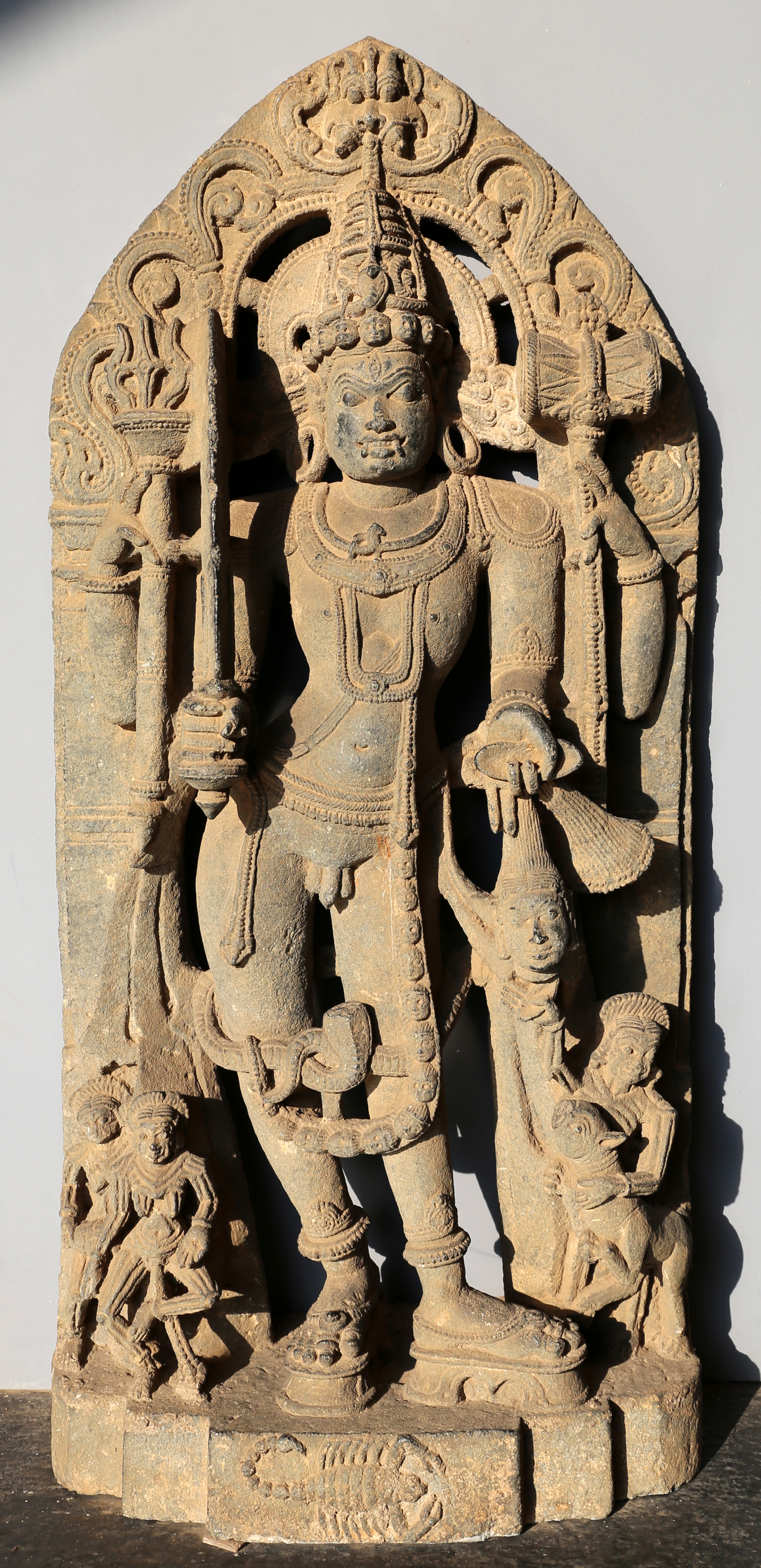
12th-century Bhairava sculpture, Karnataka

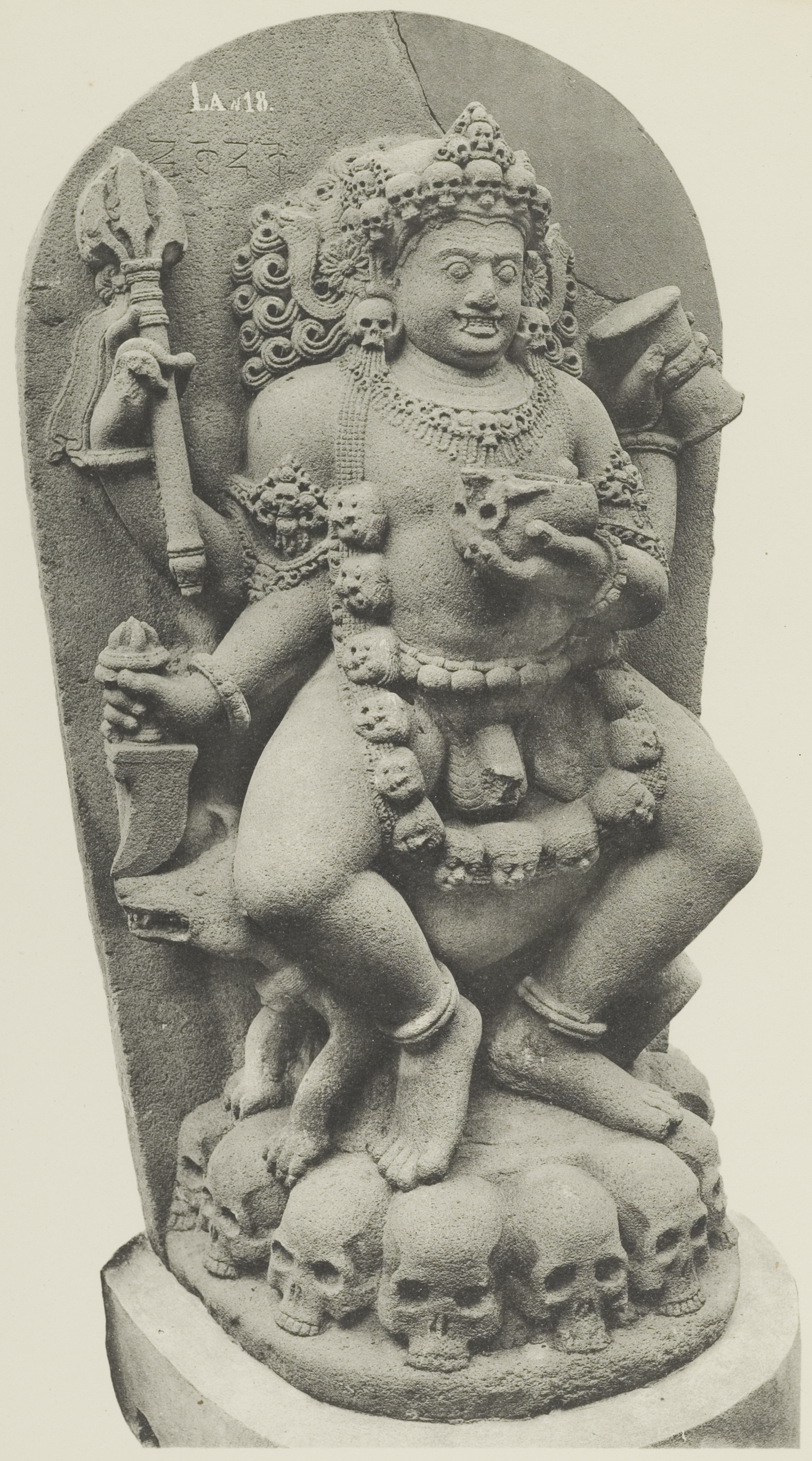
Indonesian stone Bhairava, from the syncretic Hindu-Buddhist Singhasari temple in East Java, Indonesia

In Kashmir Shaivism, Bhairava is the ultimate form of manifestation.

=== Trika System ===
Trika or Kashmiri Shaivism names the Absolute Reality (Para Brahman) as Bhairava. The Vijñāna Bhairava Tantra is a key Tantra text of the Trika System. Cast as a discourse between the god Bhairava and his consort Bhairavi it briefly presents 112 Tantric meditation methods or centering techniques (Dharana). The text is a chapter from the Rudrayamala Tantra, a Bhairava Agama. Bhairavi, the goddess, asks Bhairava to reveal the essence of the way to realization of the highest reality. In his answer Bhairava describes 112 ways to enter into the universal and transcendental state of consciousness. References to it appear throughout the literature of Trika, Kashmir Shaivism, indicating that it was considered to be an important text in the schools of Kashmir Shaiva philosophy and Trika.

== Buddhism ==
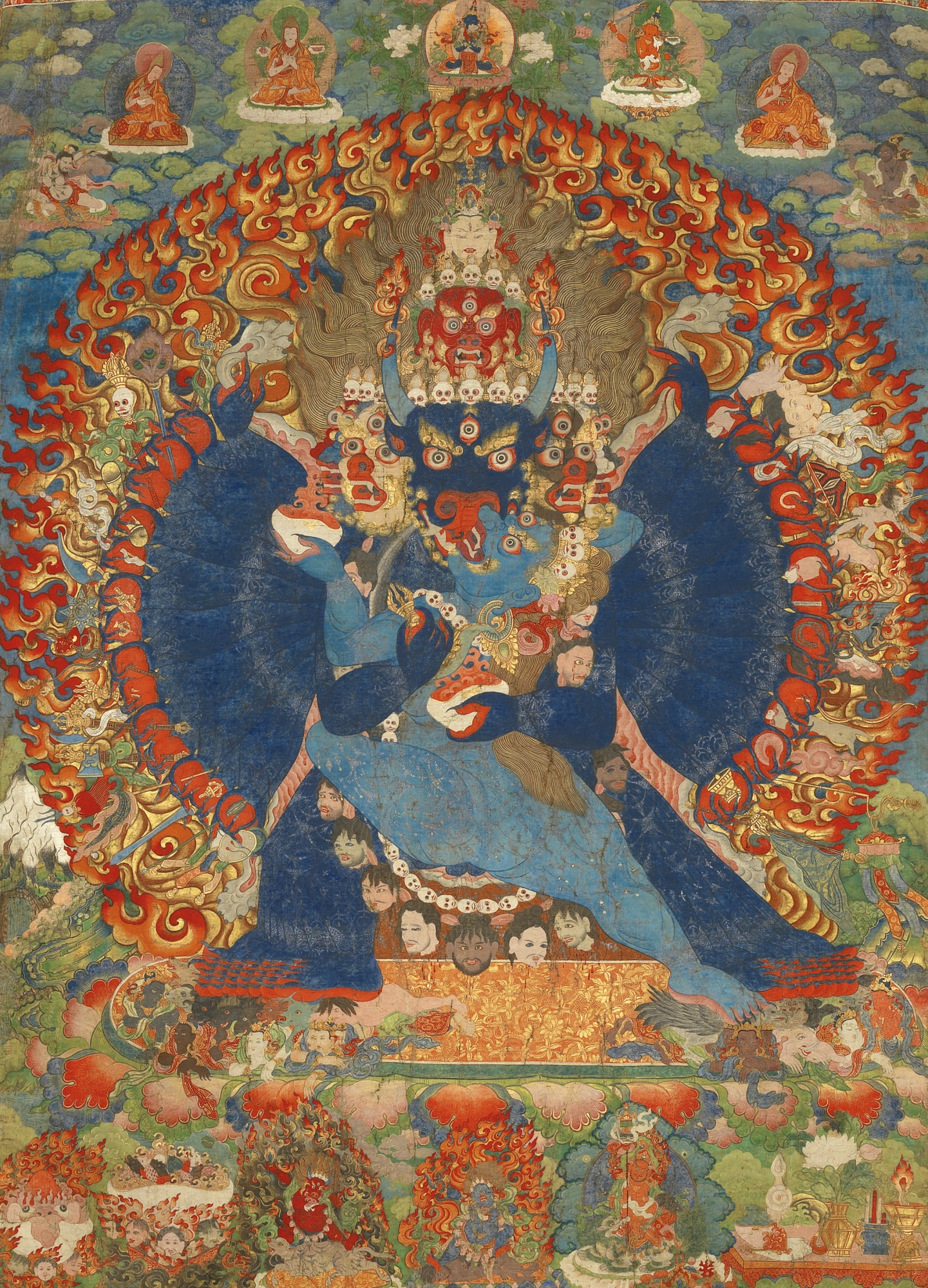
Thangka Depicting Vajrabhairava, c. 1740s.

Buddhism also adopted Bhairava (Tibetan: 'Jigs byed; Chinese: Buwei) as a deity and a dharmapala or dharma protector. The various buddhist forms of Bhairava (variously called Herukas, Vajrabhairava, Mahākāla and Yamantaka) are considered fierce deities and yidams (tantric meditational deity) in Tibetan Buddhism. They also have their own set of Buddhist tantras, the Vajrabhairava tantras. According to Tibetan tradition, these tantras were revealed to Lalitavajra in Oddiyana in the tenth century.

These texts play a particularly important role in the Sarma (new translation) traditions of Tibetan Buddhism, especially among the Gelug school where Vajrabhairava is one of the three central highest yoga tantra practices of the lineage.

Bhairava - Mahakala is also popular in Mongolia as a protector deity and was also popular among the Manchus.

The deity is also central to Newar Buddhism. The tantric practices associated with Bhairava focus on the transformation of anger and hatred into understanding.

== Worship ==
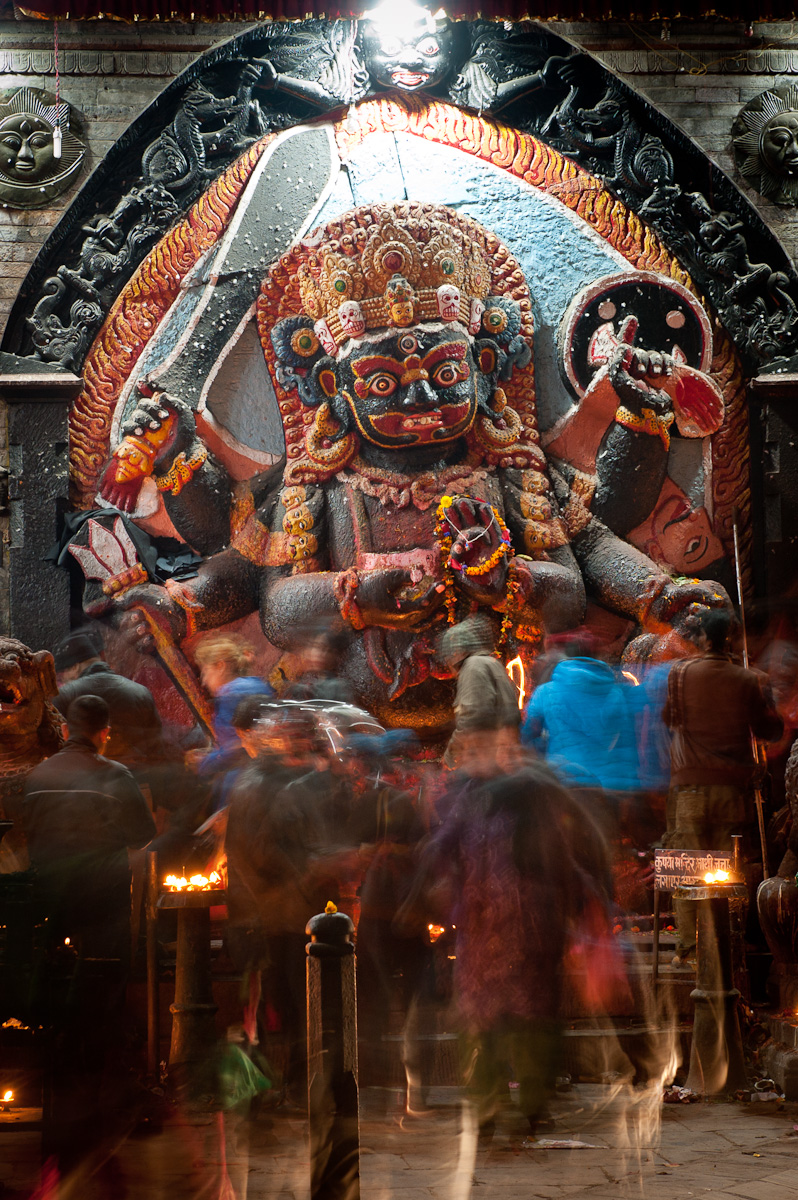
Kala Bhairava, the only smiling statue of Kala Bhairava, attended by devotees in Durbar Square, Kathmandu, Nepal

Temples or shrines to Bhairava are present within or near most Jyotirlinga temples. There are also the sacred twelve shrines dedicated to Shiva which can be found all across India including the Kashi Vishwanath Temple, Varanasi and the Kal Bhairava temple, Ujjain. The Patal Bhairava and Vikrant Bhairava shrines are located in Ujjain as well.

Gorat Kashmiris are known to worship Bhairava during Shivratri.

== Observances ==
Bhairava Ashtami, commemorating the day Kala Bhairava appeared on earth, is celebrated on Krishna paksha Ashtami of the Margashirsha month of the Hindu calendar. It is a day filled with special prayers and rituals.

== Iconography ==
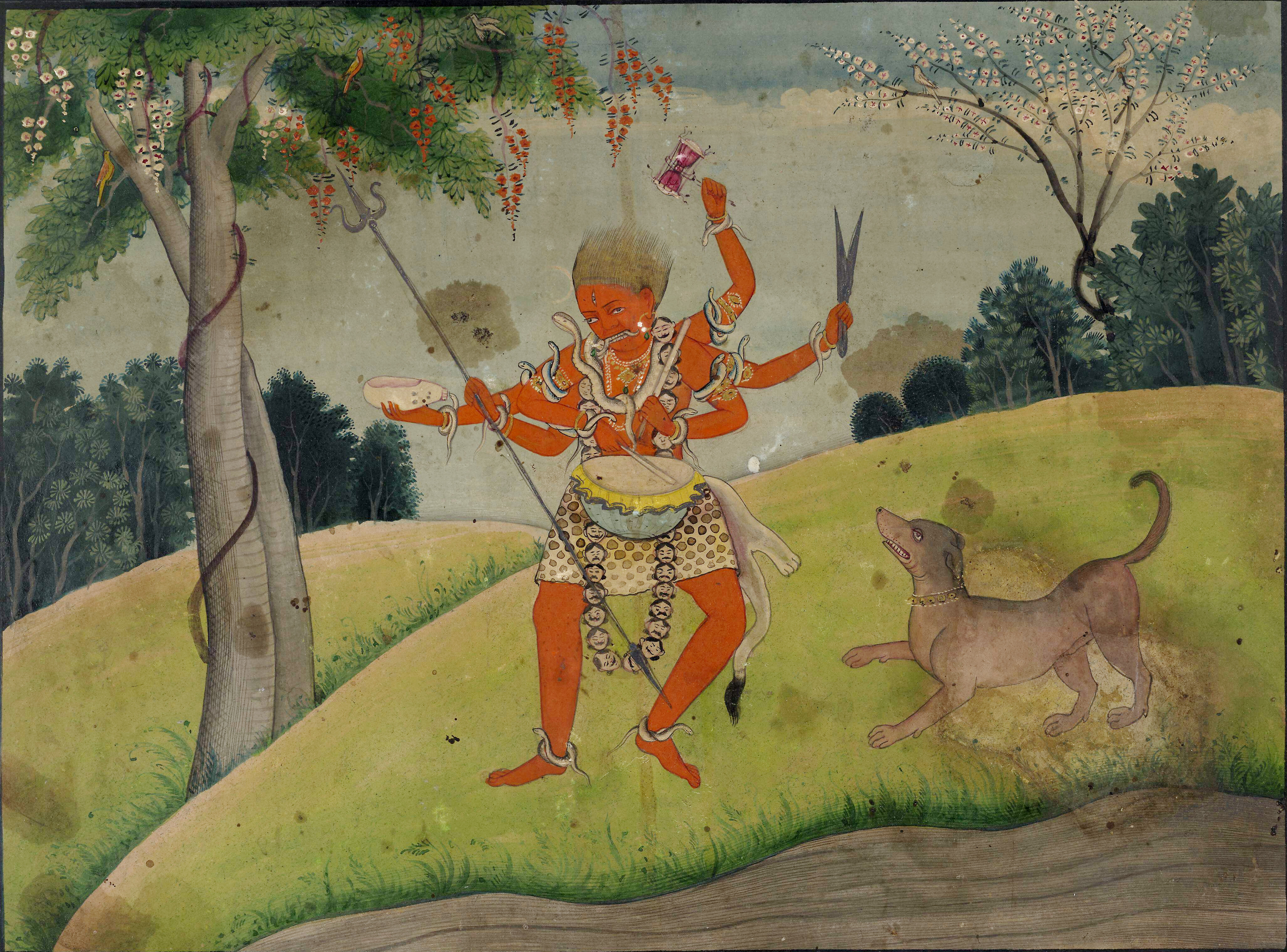
Rakta Bhairava

Bhairava is depicted as being ornamented with a range of twisted serpents, which serve as earrings, bracelets, anklets, and sacred thread (yajnopavita). He wears a tiger skin and a ritual apron composed of human bones. Bhairava has a dog (shvana) as his divine vahana (vehicle). Bhairavi is a fierce and terrifying aspect of the Devi who is virtually indistinguishable from Kali, with the exception of her particular identification as the consort of Bhairava.

Bhairava himself has eight manifestations called the Ashta Bhairava:

- Asitāṅga Bhairava
- Ruru Bhairava
- Chaṇḍa Bhairava
- Krodha Bhairava
- Unmatta Bhairava
- Kapala Bhairava
- Bhīṣaṇa Bhairava
- Saṃhāra Bhairava

Kala Bhairava is conceptualized as the guru-natha (teacher and lord) of the planetary deity Shani (Saturn).

Bhairava is known as Bhairavar or Vairavar in Tamil, where he is often presented as a grama devata or village guardian who safeguards the devotee in eight directions (ettu tikku). Known in Sinhalese as Bahirawa, he is said to protect treasures. He is the main deity worshipped by the Aghora sect.

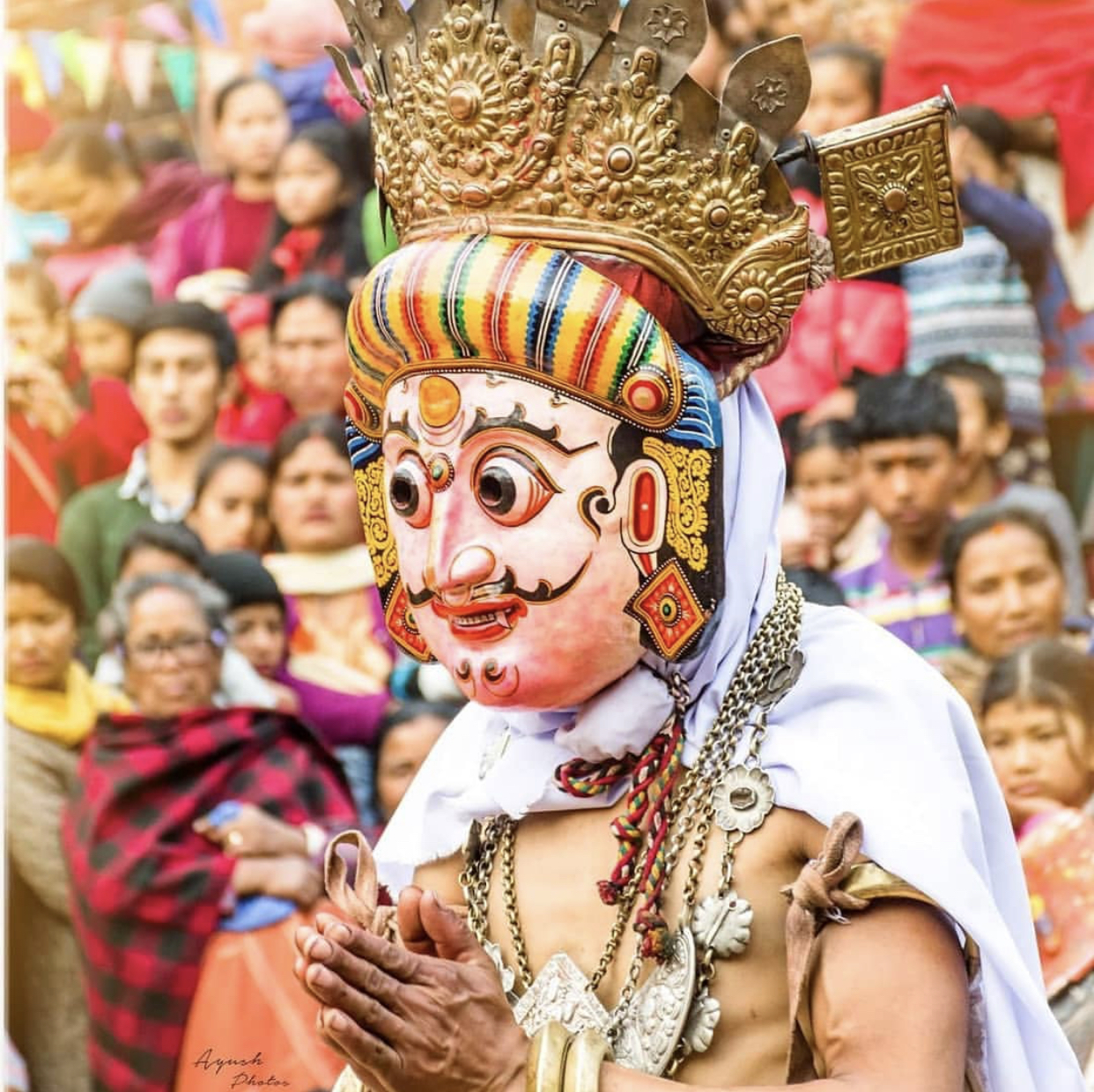
Dancer dressed as Shveta Bhairava from Bhaktapur, Nepal.

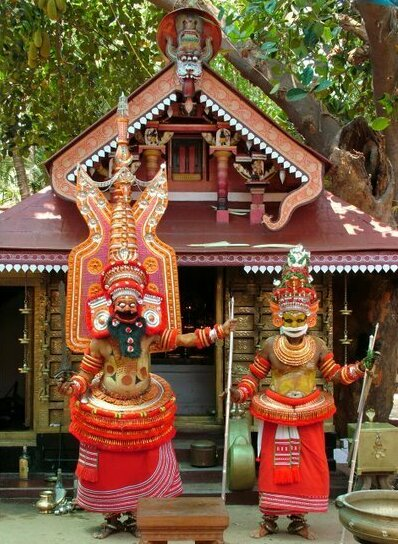
Muthappan, Kaalabhairavan worshipped in ancestral form through Theyyam form, in the northern region of the state Kerala.

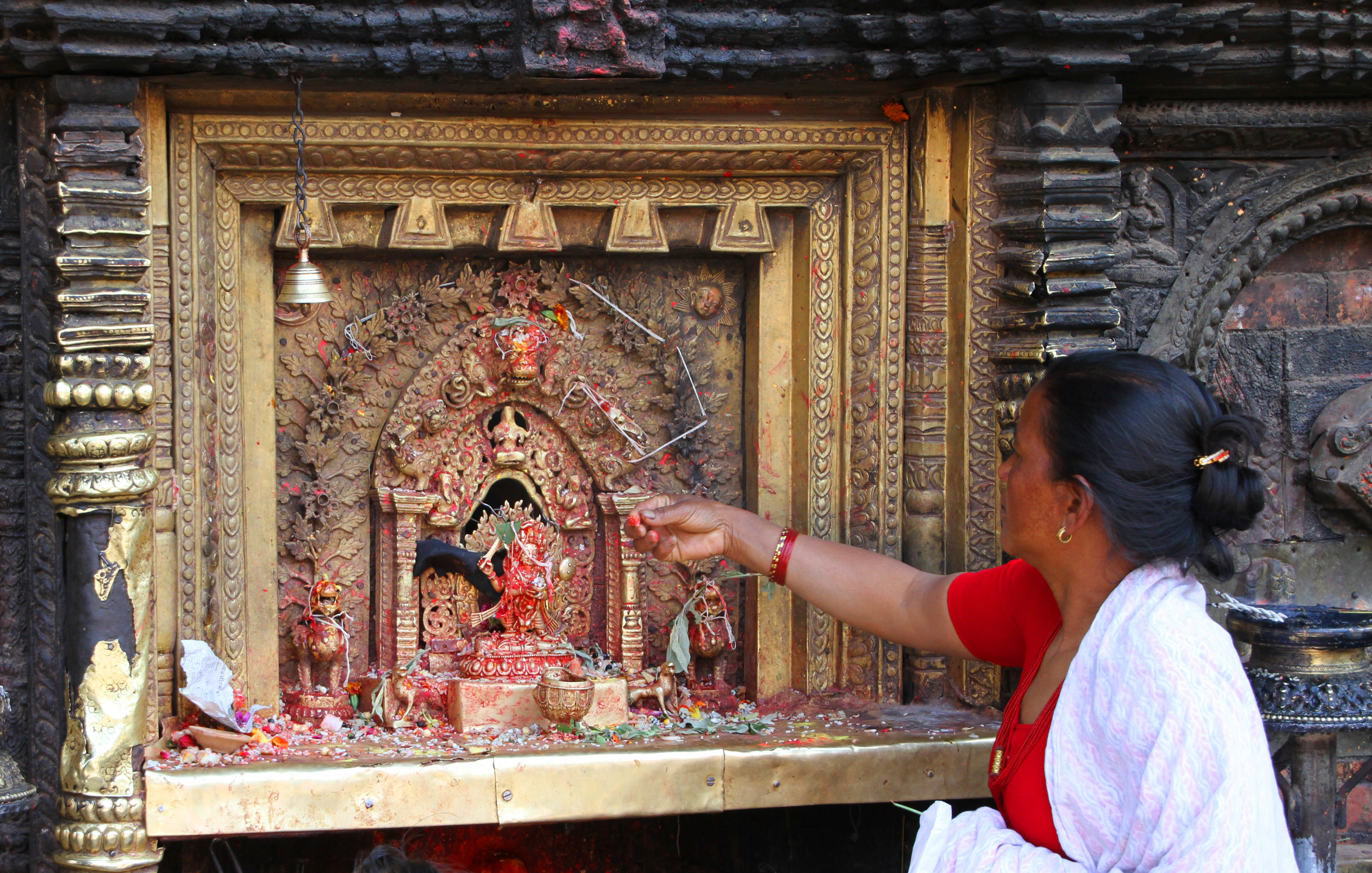
Woman offers prayers at shrine in Bhaktapur, Nepal.

== Temples ==
Thennaga Kasi Bairavar Temple is a Hindu temple to Bairavar, a fierce form of Shiva. It is located in Erode, Tamil Nadu, India. is a Hindu temple dedicated to Bairavar, a fierce form of Shiva. It is located in Erode, Tamil Nadu, India. This temple is renowned for its unique architectural style and spiritual significance.

A woman worshipping Sweta Bhairava in Kathmandu, Nepal

Bhairava is an important deity of the Newars of Nepal. All the traditional settlements of Newars have at least one temple of Bhairava. Most of the temples of Bhairava in Nepal are maintained by Tantric Newar priests. There are several Bhairava temples in the Kathmandu valley and other old newar settlements out of valley like Panauti,Banepa, Dhulikhel,Palpa and Pokhara.There are Different Jatras and chariot processions held each year in different newar towns and cities Dedicated to lo Bhairava and these Bhairava jatras are celebrated and continued from several hundreds of years in Nepal.Kalbhairava,Aakash bhairava, Shwet bhairava, Batuk bhairava, Pachali bhairava, aananda bhairava,Unmatta bhairava,mashaan bhairava,Baag bhairava, haygribha bhairava and Kritimukha Bhairava are Bhairavas widely worshipped and believed as the guardians of the Newar settlements.

In south Karnataka, Sri Kalabhairaveshwara is present as Kshetra Palaka in Sri Adichunchanagiri Hills.

Kala Bhairava temples can also be found around Shakta pithas. It is said that Shiva allocated the job of guarding each of the 52 Shakta pithas to one Bhairava. There are said to be 52 forms of Bhairava, which are considered a manifestation of Shiva himself. Traditionally, Kala Bhairava is the Grama devata in the rural villages of Maharashtra, where he is referred to as "Bhairava/Bhairavnath" and "Bairavar". In Karnataka, Bhairava is the supreme od for the Hindu community commonly referred to as Vokkaligas (Gowdas). Especially in the Jogi Vokkaliga, he is considered the caretaker and punisher. Shri Kala Bhairava Nath Swami Temple of Madhya Pradesh is also popular.

== See also ==
- Adichunchanagiri Hills
- Akash Bhairav – One of the different forms of Bhairava
- Bhairab Naach – Traditional dance of newar people
- Kshetrapala – Tutelary guardian deity in Indian religions
- Muthappan – Deity
- Sirkazhi

== Cited sources ==
- Hiltebeitel, Alf, ed. (1989). Criminal Gods and Demon Devotees: Essays on the Guardians of Popular Hinduism. Albany: State University of New York Press. ISBN 0-88706-982-7.
