= Ashta Bhairava =

Eight manifestations of Bhairava

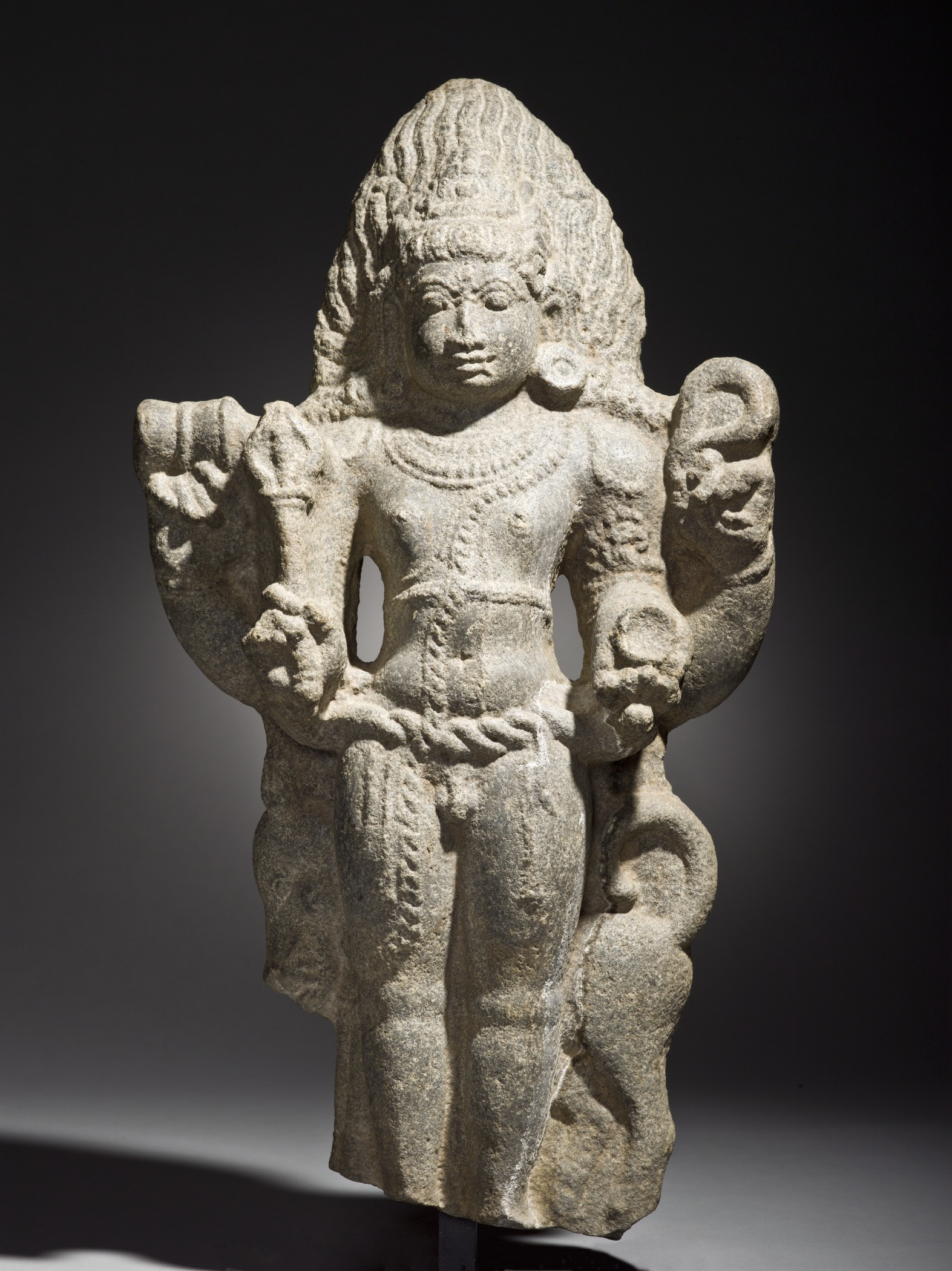
A sculpture of Bhairava, Tamil Nadu, early 13th century

The Ashta Bhairavas (Sanskrit: अष्टभैरवः, romanized: Aṣṭabhairavah, lit. 'eight Bhairavas') are the eight manifestations of the Hindu god Bhairava, a ferocious form of Shiva. They are regarded to guard and control the eight cardinal directions. Each of the Ashta Bhairavas is regarded to preside over eight subordinate Bhairavas, totalling 64 Bhairavas. The Ashta Bhairavas are described to be subordinate to Kālabhairava, who is considered the supreme ruler of time in the universe and the chief form of Bhairava.

== Description ==
Form	Attributes	Consort	Direction	Planet	Mount	Shrine	Asterism	Deity
Asitāṅga	White-complexioned; four arms; japamala, kamandalu, sword, and skull cup	Brahmani	East	Jupiter	Swan	Sattainathar Temple, Sirkazhi, Kandeeswarar Temple, Kandiyur	Pushya	Vishnu
Ruru	Light blue-complexioned; four arms; deer, axe, sword, and bowl	Maheshvari	Southeast	Venus	Bull	Rathnagiriswarar Temple, Thirumarugal	Krttika, Uttara Ashadha, Uttara Phalguni	Brahma
Caṇḍa	White-complexioned; four arms; bow, arrow, sword, and bowl	Kaumari	South	Mars	Peacock	Vaitheeswaran Koil	Mrigashirsha, Chitra, Dhanishta	Surya
Krodha	Dark blue-complexioned; four arms; conch, discus, mace, and bowl	Vaishnavi	Southwest	Saturn	Eagle	Thiruvisanallur, Thirunaraiyur	Rohini, Hasta, Shravana	Shiva
Unmattha	Golden-complexioned; four arms; sword, skull cup, pestle, and shield	Varahi	West	Mercury	Horse	Thiruveezhimizhalai	Punarvasu, Vishakha, Anuradha, Purva Bhadrapada, Uttara Bhadrapada	Indra
Kapāla	Shining yellow-complexioned; four arms; thunderbolt, noose, sword and bowl	Indrani	Northwest	Moon	Elephant	Thiruvirkudi, Pushpavaneswarar temple	Bharani, Purva Ashadha, Purva Phalguni	Chandra
Bheeṣhāna	Blood red-complexioned; four arms; sword, skull cup, trident, and pestle	Chamunda	North	Ketu	Preta	Rameswaram, Piranmalai	Ardra, Svati, Shatabhisha, Ashvini, Magha, Mula	Yama
Saṃhāra	Lightning-yellow-orange-complexioned; ten arms; trident, drum, conch, mace, discus, sword, bowl, skull-topped staff, noose, and goad	narasimhi	Northeast	Rahu	Lion	Thiruvenkadu, Kolli Hills, Vairavanpatti, Hosur	Ashlesha, Jyeshtha, Revati	Hindu deities

== Temples ==
All eight of the Ashta Bhairavas are featured at the Kashi Vishwanath Temple, Sattainathar Temple, Sirkazhi, Sri Kamanada Ishwarar Temple, Aragalur, Sri Mahabhairavar Rudra Alayam, Chengalpattu.

== See also ==
- Ashta Lakshmi
- Ashtamangala
- Ashtavinayaka
- Ashtabharya
