= Pāpa =

Concept of sin in Hinduism

According to Hinduism, pāpa (sin) is a concept that is tied to the cycle of rebirth (samsara). Hindu texts mention various categories of sins such as the five greatest sins (mahapatakas), foremost sins (ati patakas), secondary sins (upa patakas), and minor sins (prasangika patakas).

== Cycle of birth and death ==
As per Hindu texts, every action (kriya) of a living being (karta) leads to a reaction and an associated result, which forms the concept of karma. Every transgression, or demerit, signifying deeds or intentions that transgress moral and spiritual laws, results in negative karma called papa, while good deeds earn punya. As per Bhagavad Gita, a atman (soul) spends time in the svarga (heaven) for the good deeds and is cast back into earth to take a life form (jiva). As long as sins are committed, the cycle of rebirth (samsara) continues.

== Sins ==
Manusmriti also mentions five greatest sins (mahapatakas) – Brahmahatya (killing a Brahmin or a learned person), surapana (usage of alcohol or intoxicating substances), steya (stealing), guruvanganagama (committing adultery with one's spiritual teacher's wife), and mahapata kasamsarga (associating with those who have committed any of the above four sins). There are other activities (anu patakas) which are mentioned as equivalent to committing these five great sins which include murder of a menstruating or pregnant woman, killing of a kshatriya or one who has given a sacrifice, causing harm to a child or causing an abortion, betraying a friend, embezzling land and property, and having incestuous relationship with an elder or friend's spouse. Texts also mention foremost sins (ati patakas), which include crimes that are punished with the highest penalty such as having sex with one's mother, daughter, or daughter-in-law.

Texts also mention various secondary sins (upa patakas), and minor sins (prasangika patakas). Secondary sins include practices like adultery, perjury, selling alcohol and intoxicating substances, angering one's guru, disbelief in god, not performing a sacrifice or performing a sacrifice or prayer for an unworthy person or cause. Minor sins include those committed intentionally or unintentionally, with more than fifty such sins listed in the texts. These include abandoning the wife, studying forbidden texts, not caring for the parents, accepting gifts without sacrifices, killing other creatures, amongst others.

== Traits ==
Hindu texts mention various things that are not themselves sin but drive people to sin themselves. Arishadvargas (six enemies) are the six enemies of the mind listed in Hindu texts. These are kama (desire), krodha (anger), lobha (greed), mada (ego), moha (attachment), and matsarya (jealousy). These six traits are considered negative characteristics that lead to commit sins and prevent humans from attaining moksha (liberation).

== Punishment and atonement ==
The Hindu texts mention various punishments for various sins, apart from suffering in naraka (hell) in the afterlife and subsequent rebirth. However, there were differences in terms of the quantum and application of punishments based on the varnas (social classes). One has to either feel remorse (paścātāpa) or atone for the sins committed (prāyaścitta). Texts also give various means by which one can atone for the sins committed. These include public confession (abhishasta), prayer to god and chanting mantras, visiting pilgrimage sites and taking holy dip in sacred rivers, performing rituals, austere living and virtuous conduct, attaining knowledge (gnana), self control and meditation, obtaining blessings of saints, gurus or elders, and giving charity (dhana).
