= Enangudi =

Coordinates: 10.880237°N 79.672492°E

Enangudi is the main village which is unified with neighbouring villages like Adalaiyur, Karipakkam, Ketharimangalam, Putthagaram, Kayathoor, Karuppuoor, Thepiramangalam, Vawvaladi and Pakkam Kottor.

The nearest town of significant size is Tiruvarur which is 16 km away, Mayiladuthurai is 30 km and Nagapattinam is around 28 km away. The nearest Railway station is Nannilam (Sannanaloor).

Enangudi has all the basic facilities such as secondary education, primary health, veterinary health and banking.

== Bank ==
- Indian overseas bank
- tamilnad mercantile bank (Puthagaram)

== Places of worship ==
MASJID:

- East Jumma masjid
- Middle masjid
- Big masjid
- Masjidul Aqsa
- Ketharimangalam masjid
- Tamil Nadu Thowheed Jamath Markas
- Thowheed Markas without any organization
- One Masjid in Vawvaladi
- Two Masjids in Pakkam Kottor.

  And

TEMPLES:

- Sivan Temple
- 7 virgo temple
- Agaya Mariyamman temple
- Selva vinayagar temple
- Pidari Amman Temple
- Kaliyamman Temple
- Aiyyanar Temple
- Vinayagar Temple

== Schools ==
1. Government higher secondary School +12

2. Government Elementary School 5 th

3. Al Aman Crescent School +12

4. Al-kathereyaa Matriculation hr. sec School +12

5. SMT School 8th

== People ==
Most of them own rice fields (Max. leased to sub farmers) and it is a means of income for them.

The majority of the population are Muslims, and most of the males are working in foreign countries like Singapore, Malaysia, Kuwait, Saudi Arabia, and UAE. Manual labour is rapidly decreasing due to the government's 100-day jobs. TNTJ is a fast growing organization and T.M.M.k is the major community organization. T.M.M.K and M.J.K were providing ambulance services.

ENANGUDI -609701. is hosting the national PIN CODE-609 701 (Post Code).
