= Mahapatakas =

Mahapatakas are five great sins (pāpa) that are mentioned in Hindu texts.

== Cycle of birth and death ==
As per Hindu texts, every action (kriya) of a living being (karta) leads to a reaction and an associated result, which forms the concept of karma. Every transgression, or demerit, signifying deeds or intentions that transgress moral and spiritual laws, results in negative karma called pāpa, while good deeds earn punya. As per Bhagavad Gita, a atman (soul) spends time in the svarga (heaven) for the good deeds and is cast back into earth to take a life form (jiva). As long as sins are committed, the cycle of rebirth (samsara) continues.

== Sins ==
Manusmriti mentions the five greatest sins (mahapatakas):

- Brahmahatya – killing a Brahmin, an innocent soul or a learned person
- Surapana – usage of alcohol or intoxicating substances
- Steya – theft, especially stealing from a Brahmin or learned person
- Guruvanganagama – committing adultery with one's spiritual teacher's wife or a motherly figure
- Mahapatakasamsarga – associating with those who have committed any of the above four sins

There are other activities (anupatakas) which are mentioned as equivalent to committing these five great sins. Murdering a menstruating or pregnant woman, killing of a kshatriya or one who has given a sacrifice, causing harm to one who has sought refuge and endangering a child or causing an abortion are considered equivalent to Brahmahatya. Betraying a friend is considered equivalent to consuming intoxicating substances (surapana). Embezzling land and property of Brahmins, and stealing certain items such as horses, jewellery are considered equivalent to steya. Indulging in a incestuous relationship with an elder or friend's spouse is considered equivalent to guruvanganagama.

== Punishment and atonement ==
The Hindu texts mention various punishments for various sins, apart from suffering in naraka (hell) in the afterlife and subsequent rebirth. However, there were differences in terms of the quantum and application of punishments based on the varnas (social classes). One has to either feel remorse (paścātāpa) or atone for the sins committed (prāyaścitta). Texts also give various means by which one can atone for the sins committed. These include public confession (abhishasta), prayer to god and chanting mantras, visiting pilgrimage sites and taking holy dip in sacred rivers, performing rituals, austere living and virtuous conduct, attaining knowledge (gnana), self control and meditation, obtaining blessings of saints, gurus or elders, and giving charity (dhana).
