= Thirumarugal block =

Thirumarugal block is a revenue block in Nagapattinam district, Tamil Nadu, India. There are a total of 39 panchayat villages in this block.

== List of member villages ==
- Adhalaiyur
- Enangudi
