= Thirumarugal =

Town in Tamil Nadu, India

Thirumarugal is a small town, located 13 km East of Nannilam, Near Nagapatnam, Tamil Nadu in India. The history of the region is centered around ancient Rathnagiriswarar Temple, a Hindu temple dedicated to Shiva. The ten day Brahmotsavam festival celebrated during the Tamil month of Chittirai (April - May), is the major festival in the region.

In modern times, the village is part of Nagapattinam district and is administered by a village panchayat. It is also the headquarters of the Thirumarugal block. As per 2011 census, the village had a population of 9,177. The village is connected by bus transport and is located on the Kumbakonam - Nagapattinam highway via Nannilam. The Narimanam oil reserve under the Madras Refineries Limited is one of the major industry giving employment to the villagers along with agriculture.

== Etymology ==
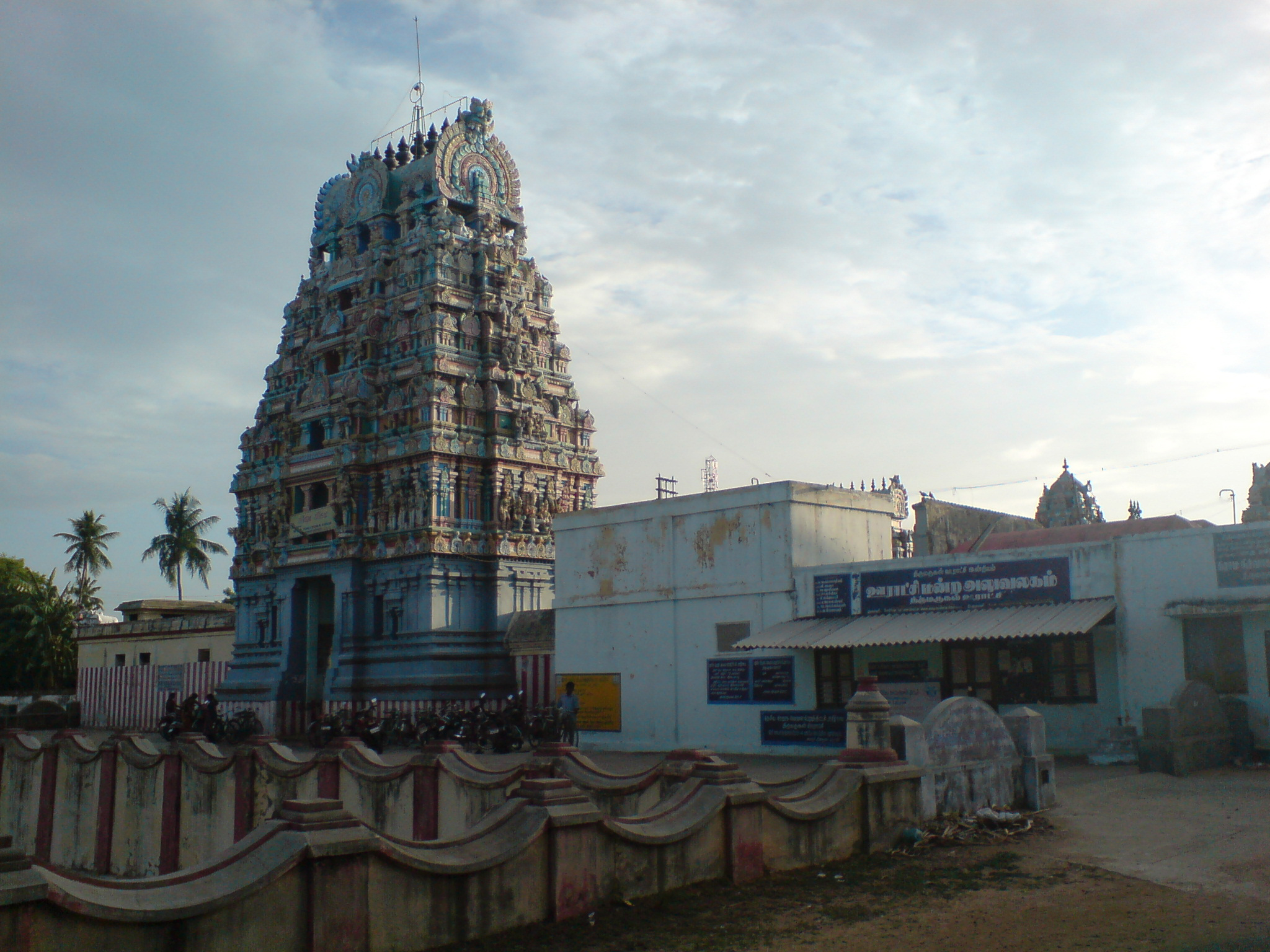
Image of Rathnagiriswarar Temple around which the history of the temple

Thirumarugal derived its name from a plantain named Marugal found inside the northern-side of the Rathnagiriswarar temple since time immemorial. The specialty of the plantain, is that it will not grow anywhere else if its branch is cut and planted. The place is also called ‘Kadalivana Kshethram’ in Sanskrit. As per Hindu legend, once there lived a merchant in Vaipur who had seven daughters. He promised to get his eldest daughter married to his sister's son. But as soon as he got a richer bridegroom, he got her married to him. He continued to cheat his sister's son promising in a similar fashion for the next five daughters as well. The last daughter wanted to keep his father's promise and married Daman. While she was moving with him, a snake bit him and he died on the spot. Hearing the lady's cry, Sambandar, who was passing by, sung in praise of the presiding deity in Thirumarugal, after which Daman's life was restored.

== Administration ==
Thirumarugal is the center of Thirumarugal block, a village administration unit in the Nagapattinam district in the South Indian state of Tamil Nadu. The block has around 39 village panchayats with a total population of 8,751 as of the 2011 census. The village Thirumarugal has a population of 9,177 with a sex ratio of 966 females for every 1,000 males. There are four secondary schools and one senior secondary school in the village. There are a total of 4,218 households and the total area of the village is 349.7 ha (864 acres). There is a primary health care center, veterinary clinic, medical practitioner with MBBS degree and four other medical practitioners. Being a tourist village, the public transport mechanism like auto, taxi and bus are common. The village also has an Anganwadi centre and nutrition centre. The village is also agrarian with a total of 455.3 ha (1,125 acres) irrigatable land. The Narimanam oil reserve under the Madras Refineries Limited have installed Cauvery Basin Refinery also known as Nagapattinam Refinery in the region provides much employment to the villagers.

== Culture ==
Thirumarugal has produced one of the best Nagaswara artists, namely, Natesa Pillai as per Music Academy. The festivals of the temple align with the Ratnagiriswarar temple rituals. There are weekly rituals such as somavaram (Monday) and sukravaram (Friday), fortnightly rituals such as pradosham and monthly festivals such as amavasai (new moon day), kiruthigai, pournami (full moon day) and sathurthi. Brahmotsavam during the Tamil month of Chittirai (April - May), Thiruvadhirai during the month of Margazhi (December – January) and Annabhishekam during the Tamil month of Masi are the major festivals celebrated in the temple. The Brahmotsavam festival celebrated for ten days, is the major festival in the village. During the Tamil month of Avani, Vardhajaperumal offers Theerthavari to Lakshmi on the Lakshmi Theertham temple tank.
