= Rathnagiriswarar Temple =

Shiva temple in Tamil Nadu, India

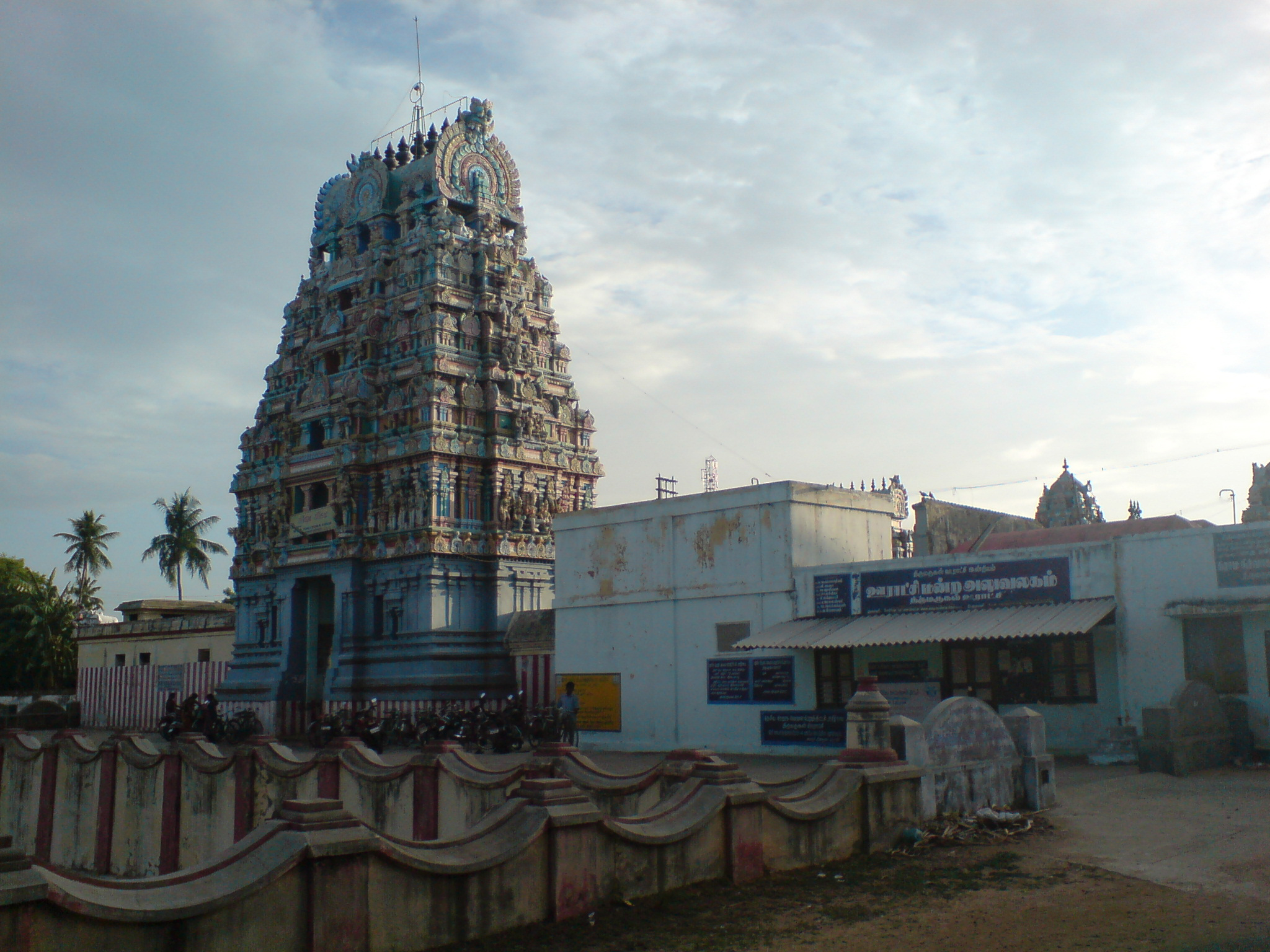

Religion
- Affiliation: Hinduism
- District: Nagapattinam district
- Deity: Manickavannar, Rathanagiriswarar(Shiva) Vanduvar Kuzhali(Parvathi)

Location
- Location: Thirumarugal
- State: Tamil Nadu
- Country: India
- Interactive map of Rathnagiriswarar Temple

Architecture
- Type: Dravidian architecture

Rathnagiriswarar Temple (Tamil: இரத்தினகிரிஸ்வரர் கோயில்) is a Hindu temple dedicated to Shiva, located in Thirumarugal, 10 km East of Nannilam, Near Nagapatnam, in Nagapattinam district, Tamil Nadu in India.

It is one of the 275 Paadal Petra Sthalams, where two of the most revered Nayanars (Saivite Saints), Appar and Tirugnana Sambandar have sung the glories of this temple.

== Name origin ==
Thirumarugal derived its name from a plantain named Marugal, a type of banana tree found inside the northern-side of the Rathnagiriswarar temple since time immemorial.

== Gallery ==
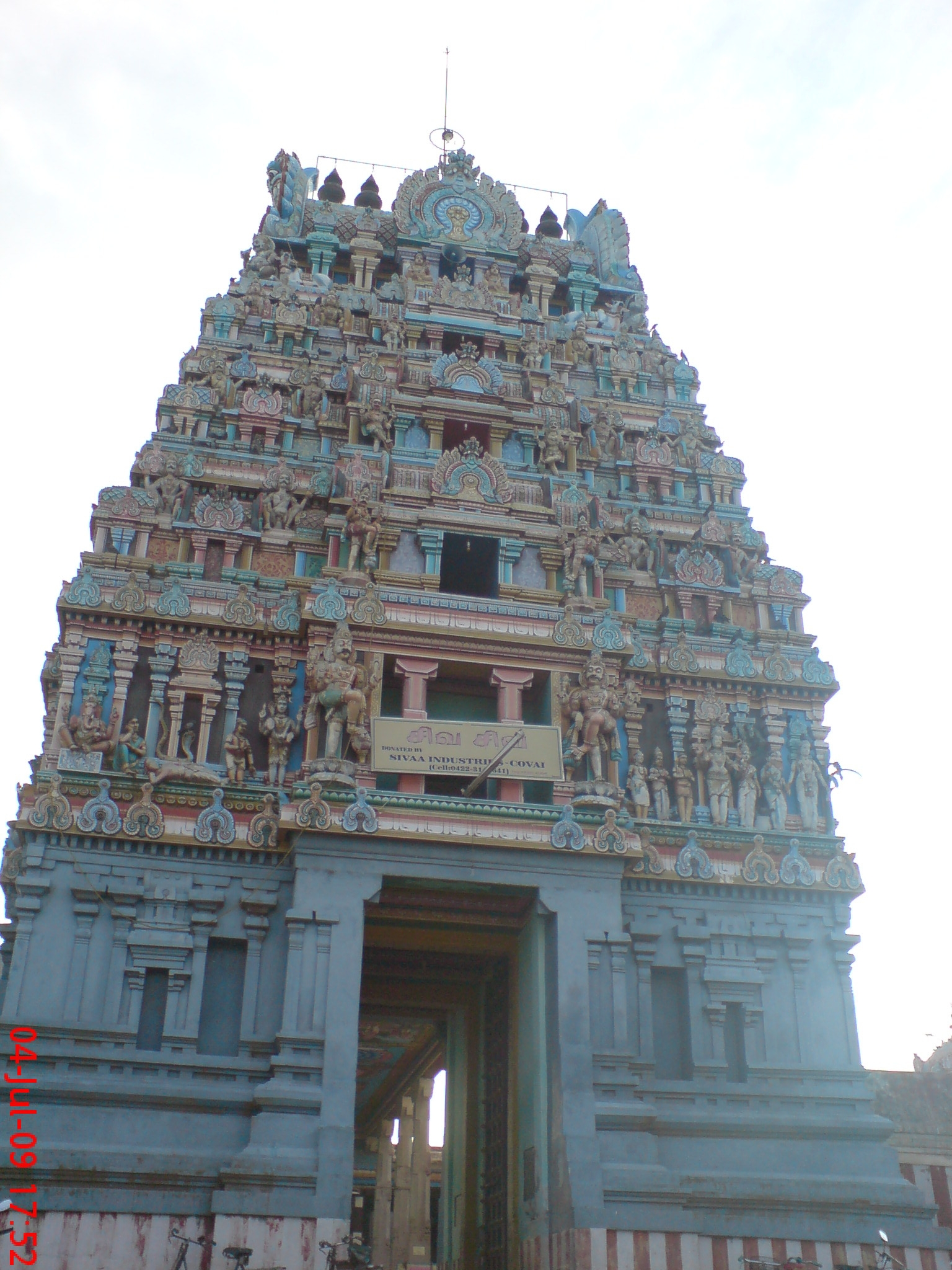
Gopuram view

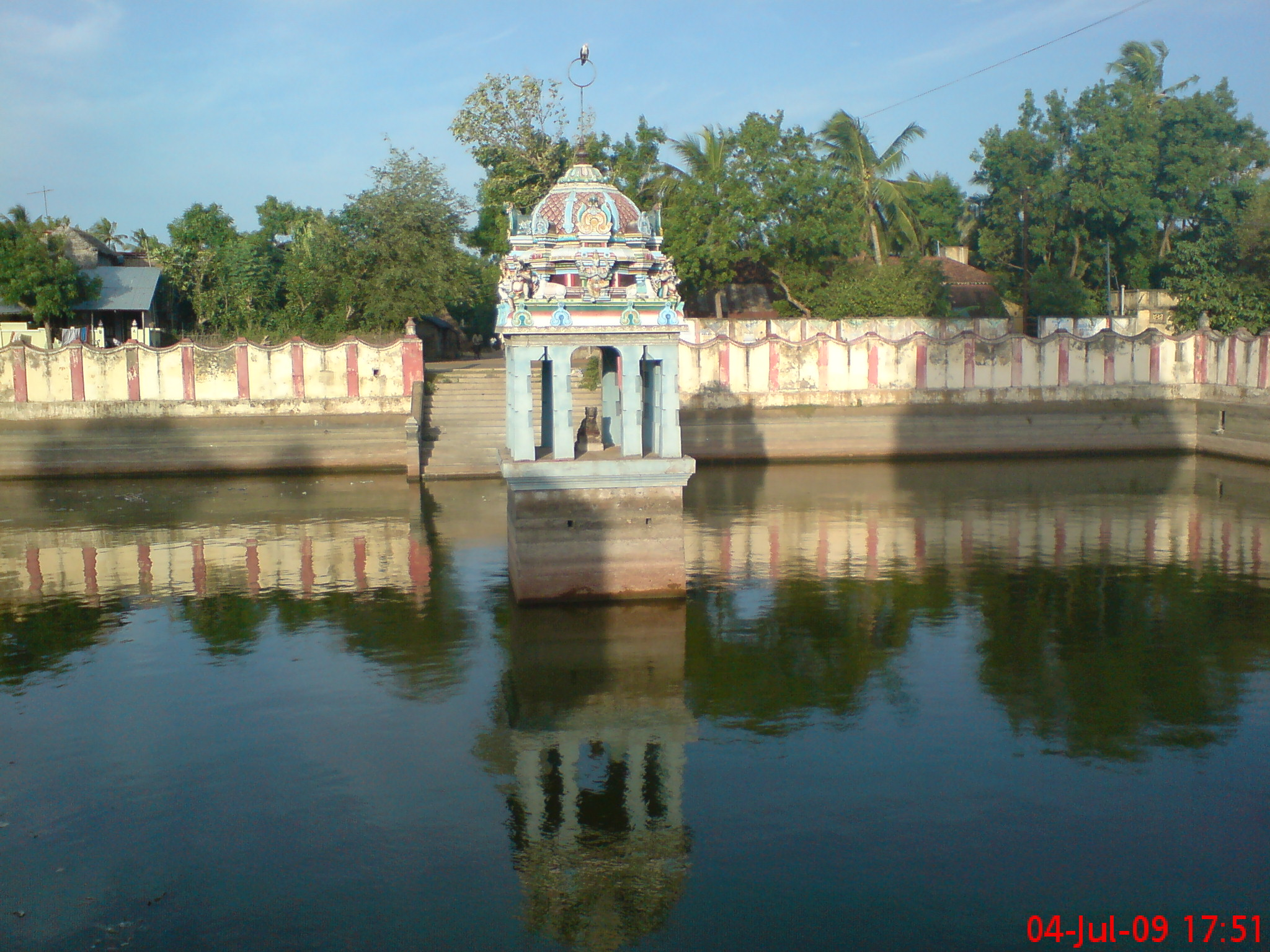
Temple Tank

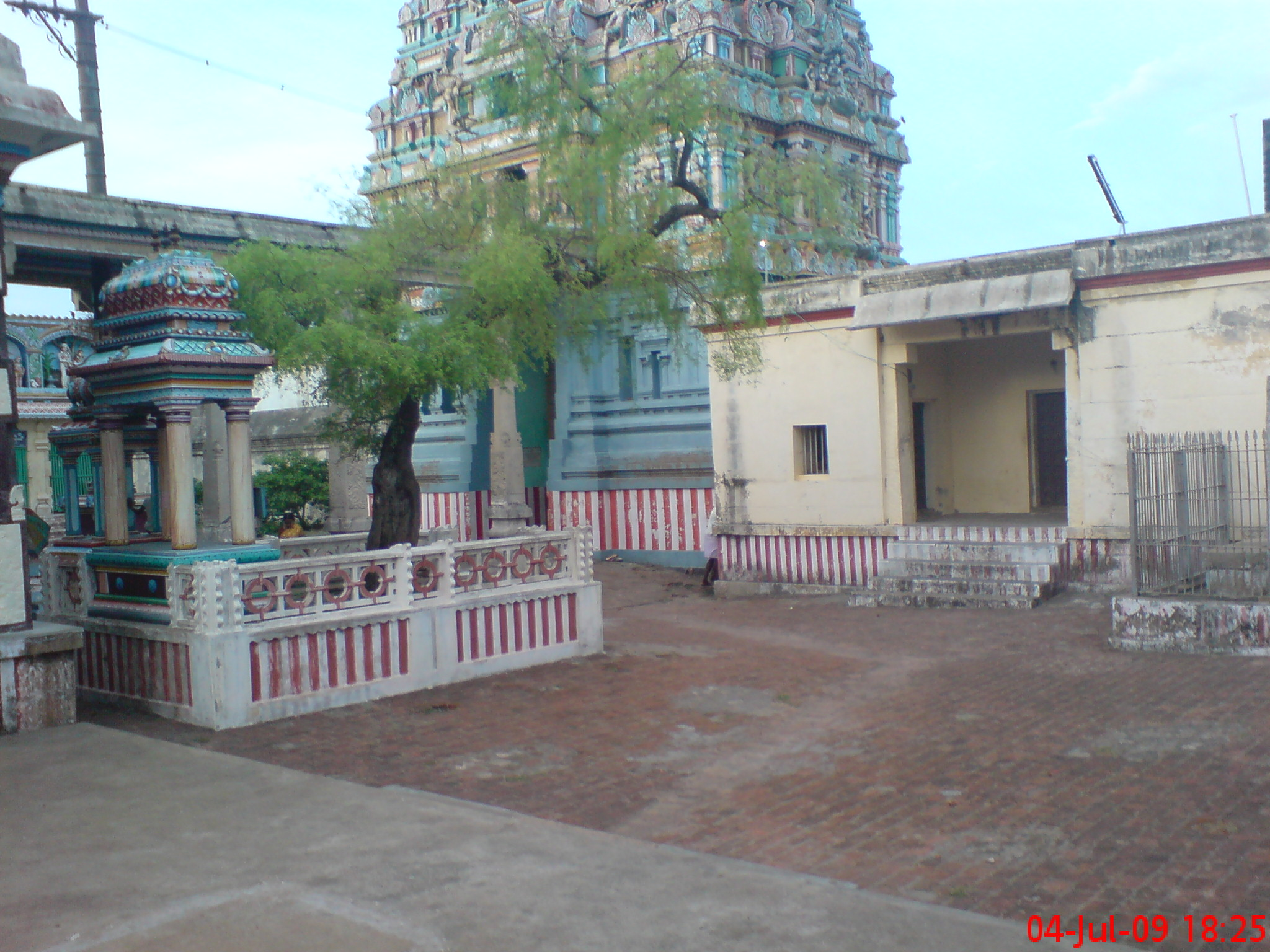
Inside view

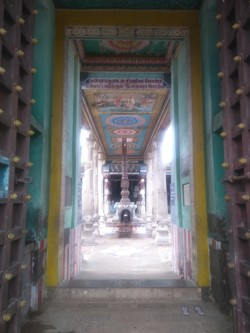
Front Mandapa

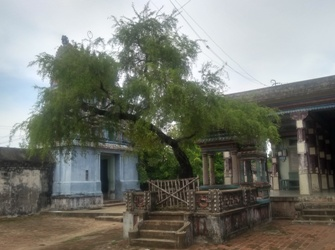
Tirumana mandapa

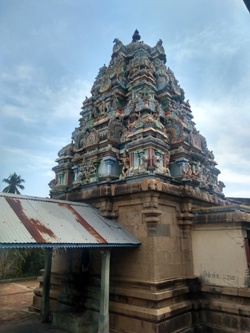
Vimana of presiding deity

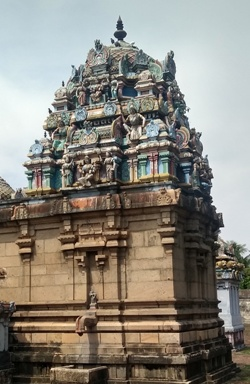
Vimana of Goddess

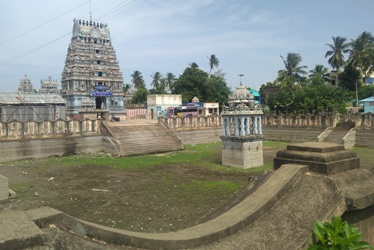
Mandapa in the middle of tank

== Notes ==
- P. V. Jagadisa Ayyar (1920). South Indian shrines: illustrated. Madras Times Printing and Pub. Co. pp. 360–369.
