= Pushpavaneswarar temple =

Temple in India

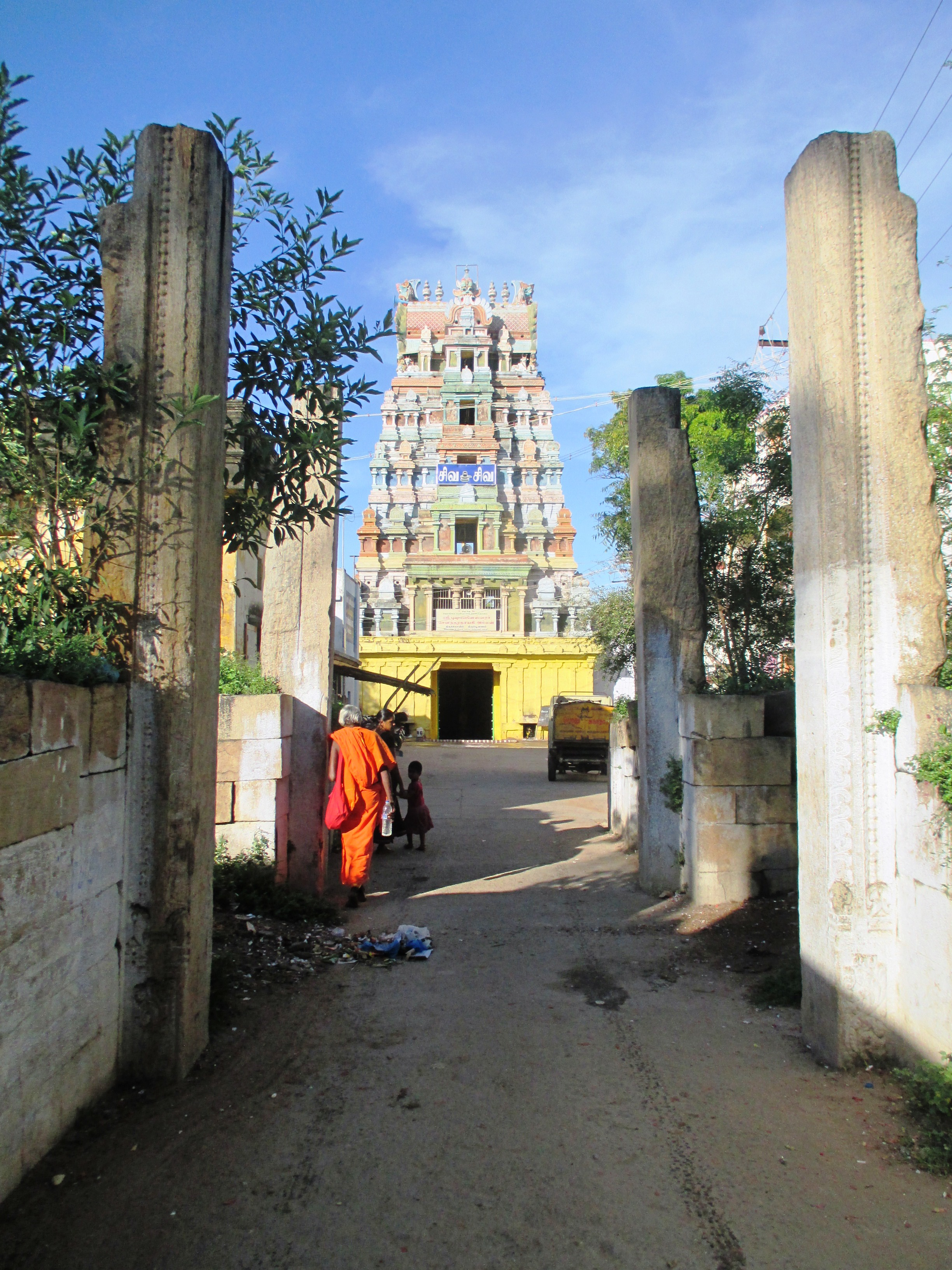

- Location in Tamil Nadu

Religion
- Affiliation: Hinduism
- District: Sivaganga
- Deity: Pushpavaneswarar(Shiva) Soundaranayagi(Parvathi)

Location
- Location: Sivaganga
- State: Tamil Nadu
- Country: India
- Coordinates: 9°49′37″N 78°15′24″E

Architecture
- Type: Dravidian architecture

Pushpavaneswarar temple (also called Poovananathar temple or Thirpoovanam temple) in Thirupuvanam, a town in Sivaganga district in the South Indian state of Tamil Nadu, is dedicated to the Hindu god Shiva. Constructed in the Dravidian style of architecture, the temple is believed to have been built during the Cholas period in the 7th century. Shiva is worshipped as Pushpavaneswarar and his consort Parvathi as Soundaranayagi.

The presiding deity is revered in the 7th century Tamil Saiva canonical work, the Tevaram, written by Tamil saint poets known as the Nayanmars and classified as Paadal Petra Sthalam. A granite wall surrounds the temple, enclosing all its shrines. The temple has a seven-tiered Rajagopuram, the gateway tower. The temple is located on the banks of Vaigai river.

The temple is open from 6am - 1 pm and 4 - 8:30 pm on all days. Four daily rituals and four yearly festivals are held at the temple, of which the Vaikasi Visagam celebrated during the Tamil month of Vaikasi (May - June), Aaadi Mulaikattu festival celebrated during the Tamil month of Aadi (August - September), Navaratri during the Tamil month of Purattasi (September - October) and Aipasi Kolattam festival during the Tamil month of Aipasi (October - November are the most prominent festivals celebrated in the temple for Pushpavaneswarar being the most prominent festivals. The temple is maintained and administered by the Hindu Religious and Endowment Board of the Government of Tamil Nadu.

== Legend ==
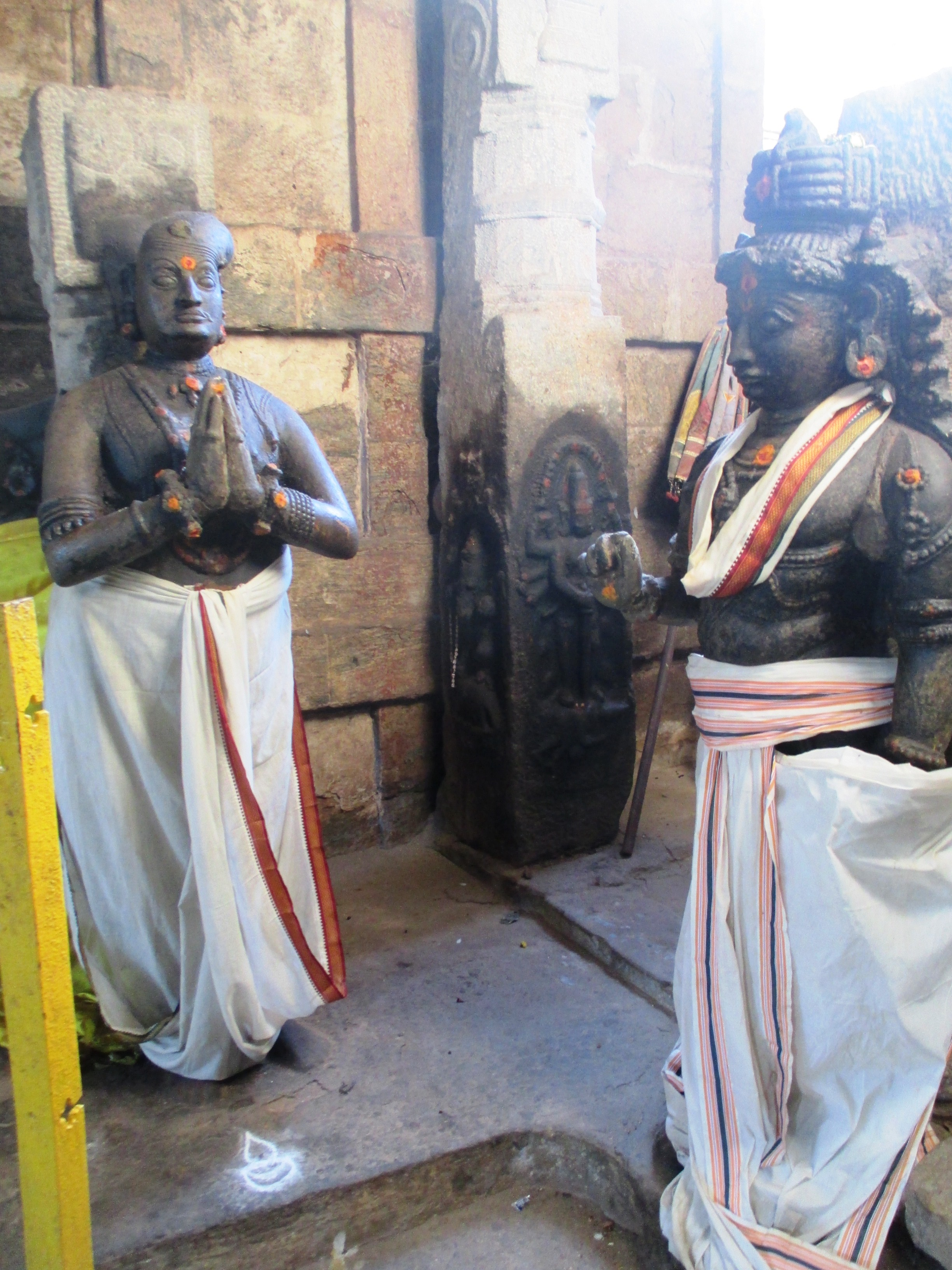
Image of Great Emperor Thirumalai Nayakkar, Viyanagara Kingdom

As per Hindu legend, this is one of the 64 places where Shiva performed his Thiruvilayadal, the divine plays. A dancing girl named Ponanaial was a staunch devotee of Shiva and her only aim in life was to make an idol of Shiva made of gold. She was not able to accomplish due to lack of money. Pleased by her devotion, Shiva appeared in the form of metallurgist named Rasavathi who converted iron, bronze and aluminium to make the golden idol. Impressed by the beauty of the idol, Ponanaial pinched the cheeks of the idol, which is believed to be the mark in the idol.

The lingam in the temple is believed to have been self-manifested and was worshipped by Surya, Dharmaraja, Nala, Chandra, Thirasanan, Brahma and Vishnu. Since Shiva appeared under Parijatha tree, the presiding deity came to be known as Pushpaveneswarar.

== Architecture ==
Pushpavaneswarar temple is located in Thirupuvanam, a village located on the banks of Vaigai river, located 20 km (12 mi) from Madurai and 29 km (18 mi) from Sivaganga. The temple in its current structure built of stone was built by the Chola king Aditya I (870 - 907 CE). The temple has a seven-tiered Rajagopuram, the gateway tower that pierces the rectangular wall that houses all the shrines. The temple tank is located adjacent to the temple. The sanctum sanctorum houses one of the rare images of Pushpavaneswarar in the form of Lingam, an iconic form of Shiva with three faces, said to be of the very few in India. There is an Ardha Mandapa and a Mukha mandapa, pillared halls leading to the sanctum. The first precinct has the shrines of Vinayakar, Murugan, Durga, Dakshinamurthy and Chandikeswara. The second precinct has a hundred pillared hall.

== History ==
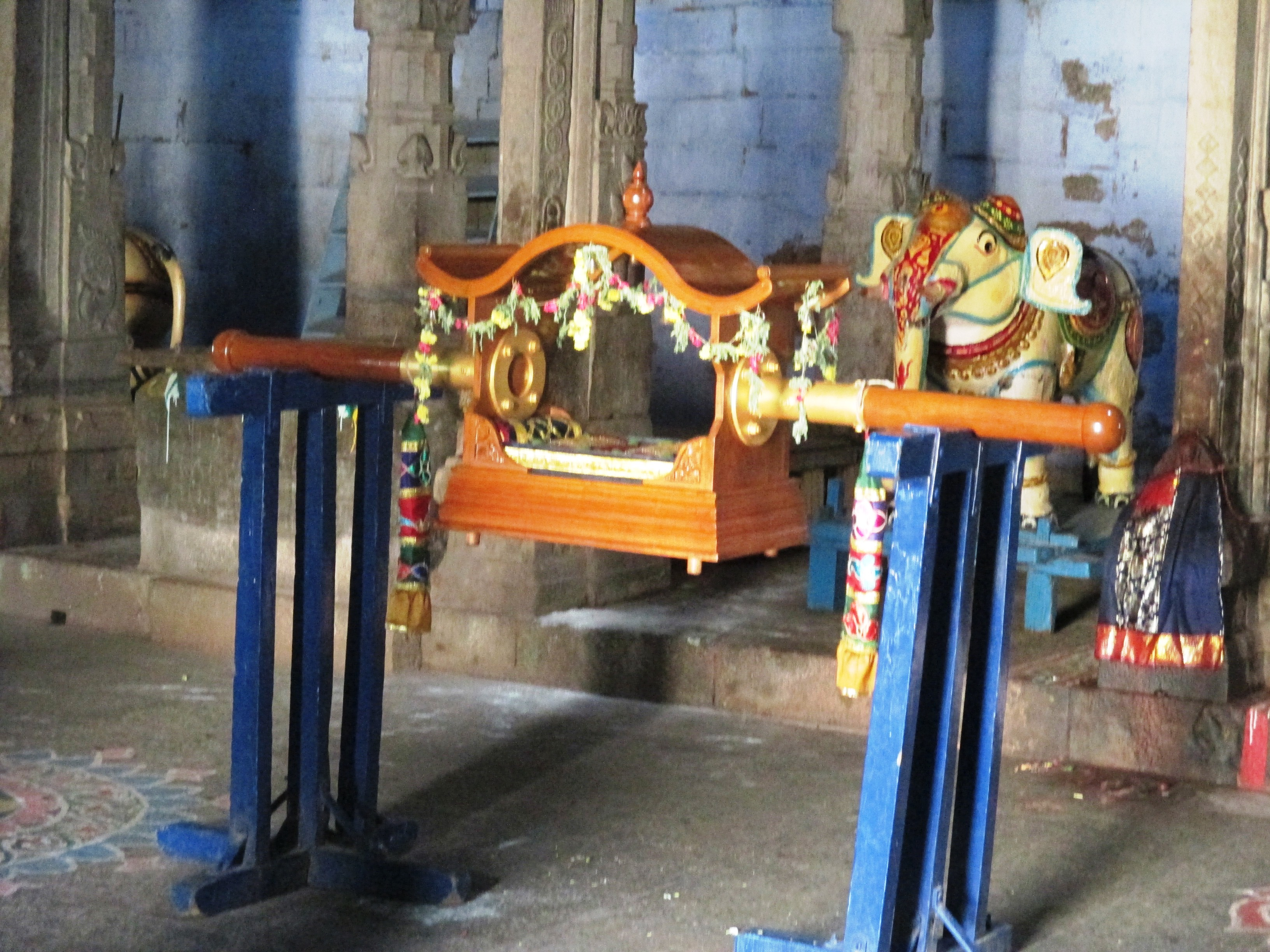
Festival images of the temple

The exact year of building could not be ascertained from the inscriptions, but the stone structure of Pushpavaneswarar shrine in its current form, is built during the time of Chola king Aditya I (870 - 907 CE). The inscriptions on the two sides of the Southern shrine of the temple indicate an endowment from Aditya for perpetual lighting of lamps in the temple. Theerthavari, the sacred bathing of the presiding deity during the auspicious days in the Tamil month of Puratasi (September - October). The temple has another inscription in the second precinct during the time of Uttama Chola (970-985 CE) for the maintenance and worship of Pushpavaneswarar and Varadaraja Perumal afforded to four able men. During the reign of Raja Raja Chola I (984-1015 CE), a village named Manali was gifted to the temple - the inscription indicates that the temple was built by Sembiyar Mahadevi. The structure of the Vishnu shrine is believed to have expanded during the reign of Rajendra Chola I (1012-1044). It is one of the shrines of the 275 Paadal Petra Sthalams.

== Festival ==
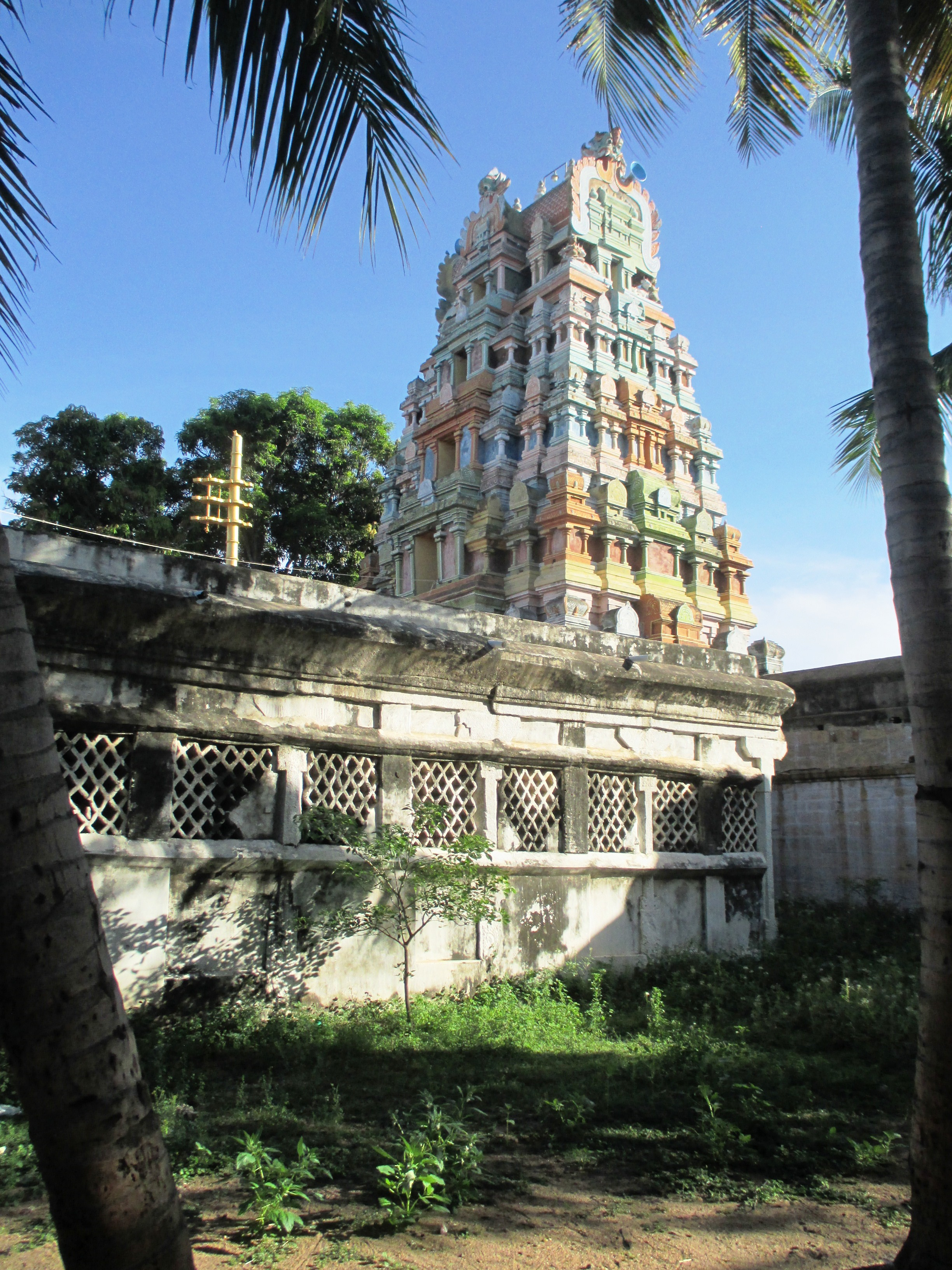

The temple follows Saivite tradition. The temple priests perform the pooja (rituals) during festivals and on a daily basis. As at other Shiva temples of Tamil Nadu, the priests belong to the Shaivaite community, a Brahmin sub-caste. The temple rituals are performed four times a day: Kalasanthi at 8:30 a.m., Uchikalam at 11:30 p.m., Sayarakshai at 6:00 p.m., and Sayarakshai between 8:00 - 8:00 p.m. Each ritual has three steps: alangaram (decoration), neivethanam (food offering) and deepa aradanai (waving of lamps) for both Pushpavaneswarar and Amirthambigai.There are weekly, monthly and fortnightly rituals performed in the temple. The temple is open from 6am - 12 pm and 4-8:30 pm.

Vaikasi Visagam celebrated during the Tamil month of Vaikasi (May - June), Aaadi Mulaikattu festival celebrated during the Tamil month of Aadi (August - September), Navaratri during the Tamil month of Purattasi (September - October) and Aipasi Kolattam festival during the Tamil month of Aipasi (October - November are the most prominent festivals celebrated in the temple. There are other common festivals like Shivaratri, Vinayaga Chaturthi, Vijayadasami and Karthigai Deepam celebrated in the temple. There is a wish tree in the compound having Naga, a snake representation. Childless ladies pray for the attaining child by placing or installing the stone symbols praying Vakrakali.

== Religious significance ==
Tirugnana Sambandar, a 7th century Tamil Saivite poet, venerated Pushpavaneswarar in ten verses each in Tevaram, compiled as the First Tirumurai. Appar, a contemporary of Sambandar, also venerated Pushpavaneswarar in 10 verses in Tevaram, compiled as the Fifth Tirumurai. The temple also finds mention in the works of Sundarar As the temple is revered in Tevaram, it is classified as Paadal Petra Sthalam, one of the 275 temples that find mention in the Saiva canon. The temple also finds mention in the 36th chapter of Thiruvilaiyadal Puranam.
