= Punya (Hinduism) =

Hindu philosophical concept

Punya (Sanskrit: पुण्य, romanized: puṇya, lit. 'virtue'), also rendered punyam (Sanskrit: पुण्यम्, romanized: puṇyam) is a concept in Hinduism with various definitions. It generally refers to virtue or merit, and the activities that allow one to acquire this attribute, in order to achieve liberation from samsara, the cycle of birth and death in the material world.

== Definitions ==
Punya is referred to as good karma or a virtue that contributes benefits in this and the next birth and can be acquired by appropriate means and also accumulated. In Vedanta terms punya is the invisible wealth, a part of dharma, the first of four human goals; the other three goals being artha, kama, and moksha. Punya and pāpa are the seeds of future pleasure and pain, the former, which sows merits, exhausts itself only through pleasure and the latter, which sows demerits, exhausts itself only through pain; but jivan mukti ends all karmic debts consisting of and signified by these two dynamics.

== Philosophical traditions ==
During the Vedic period, brahmacharya practiced by the Brahmins was believed to ensure the desired gain of eternal life but owing to the changes in living patterns and increase in the demands of life, people veered towards Brahmaloka which the accumulation of merits of punya-karma ('good deeds or actions') seemed to promise and opted for the deva-yāna or 'the path of the gods'.

The dynamics of karma played a large role in the development of Buddhist thought. The Buddhists believe that karma determines one’s nature and life-pattern but to them karma is chetnā, a mental drive, a psychological phenomenon, rather than a law governing substantial existence. The Buddhists consider Punya as the extraordinary force that confers happiness, as a spiritual merit which is one of the ten forms of balas (sources of strength) to a bodhisattva. They hold the belief that charity leads to the accumulation of punya or a happier rebirth on earth or a long sojourn in heaven. Buddha-knowledge (enlightenment) transcends even the law of karma.

The principle of Sthiti Bandha (duration-quality bondage), according to Jainism, involves attachment of karmic matter to the soul through anubhava bandha or rasa bandha which refers to the determination of the fruits of actions of the soul that such an attachment produces at the time of attachment of karmic matter or through pradesha bandha that deals with the quantum of karmic matter drawn towards the soul as determined by the soul’s actions. The karmic matter produced due to good activities of the mind, body and speech is the pleasant punya ('virtuous') karmic matter and that produced due to evil activities is the unpleasant pāpa ('sinful') karmic matter. These karmas have to exhaust themselves to produce their results.

The Nyāya School understands dharma and adharma to refer to punya and pāpa, with punya relating to one’s own or others’ well-being and pāpa relating to harm done to others, or in terms of doing one’s duties and their violation; it connects dharma to well-being and duty.

The concept of Karma, with the idea of rebirth as the background, was effectively introduced into Indian thought by Yajnavalkya in the course of his discussion with Jāratkārva Ārtabhāga who wanted to know about what happens after death (Brihadaranyaka Upanishad III.ii.13), whether present actions matter in respect of the experience of the after-death state and how human efforts and karma are inter-related. The Vedic people were multi-religious and believed in the existence of heaven and hell and in the transmigration of souls. For them the performance of yajna was important, and no yajna was complete or fruitful without dakshina i.e. the fee to the priests, and dāna i.e. charity, both deemed meritorious acts or punya-karma; they accepted the philosophy of sin (pāpa) and merit (punya).

== Literature ==
Punya is a very ancient Sanskrit word which appears in the Rigveda. For instance, in a prayer to Kapinjala Ivendro Devata, Rishi Gutsamada, while describing the qualities of an upadeshaka ('teacher') states:

उद्गातेव शकुने सं गायसि ब्रह्मपुत्रइव सवनेषु शंससि |
वृषेव वाजी शिशुमतीरपीत्या सर्वतो नः शकुने भद्रमावद विश्वतो नः शकुने पुण्यमावद || - (Rig Veda II.43.2)

in which mantra the word, punya, is used to mean - 'good' or 'auspicious' or 'happy'. Many other Vedic texts, such as Chandogya Upanishad (VIII.ii.6) – पुण्यजितो लोकः (in which phrase aja refers to the Brahmaloka), have used it as meaning 'agreeable' or 'happy'. Otherwise, in Sanskrit literature, this word is used to indicate 'advantageous', 'good', 'convenient', 'beneficent' or 'purifying'; Manusmṛti also uses it meaning the same; however, the opposite of punya is apunya, which means that the word, punya cannot at all places be translated as 'merit' or 'meritorious', more so because the word pāpa is most often translated as 'sin'.

Adi Shankara exclaims:-

पुण्यानि पापानि निरिन्द्रयस्य निश्चेतसो निर्विकृतेः निराकृतेः |
कुतो ममाखण्डसुखानुभूतेः ब्रूते ह्यनन्वागत मित्यपि श्रुतिः ||

"How can there be for me puṇya and pāpa who am without organs, without mind, without change and without form? How can these pertain to me who enjoy infinite bliss? The ananvāgataśruti also declares that these will not attend on me." — Vivekachudamani (St.504)

In his commentary on this stanza, Śri Candraśekhara Bhāratī of Śringeri explains that punya is the outcome of doing prescribed works, and pāpa, the prohibited. All works pertaining to the body, to the mind and to speech are karma, the good and bad with reference to actions make for punya and pāpa respectively; all actions and their outcome relate to the mind or to the body with form possessing sense-organs. The infinite bliss that Shankara speaks of is the sukha not generated by connection with sense-objects and therefore, in its experience there is no grief, no superimposition and no imagination whatsoever. During the Vedic period speaking untruth was a sin, and false accusers were the real sinners; performance of yajna washed away all such sins, which means ritual acts were associated with morality. Untruth and impurity could be washed away by water or wiped away by Darbha grass. Along with the concept of Rta (righteousness) there was the more prominent concept of anrta, the opposite of righteousness or untruth; terms for good and evil were developed and a wicked person was called pāpa, where after from the term, sādhu denoting what was right, was the concept of punya developed. Yajnavalkya explains –

यथाचारी यथाचारी तथा भवति साधुकारी साधुर्भवति, पापकारी पापो भवति पुण्यः पुण्येन कर्मणा भवति, पापः पापेन |

"As it (the self) does and acts, so it becomes; by doing good it becomes good, and by doing evil it becomes evil." - (Brihadaranyaka Upanishad (IV.iv.5)

In his commentary, Shankara states that the 'doing good' referred to here is the prescribed conduct (scriptural injunctions and prohibitions), actions are not prescribed for acts, good or evil prompted by desire and the cause of identification and transmigration, do not require habitual performance.
