= Adhalaiyur =

Village in Tamil Nadu, India

Coordinates: 10.880648°N 79.665856°E

Adhalaiyur, also spelt Adalaiyur, is a village in Thirumarugal block within Nagapattinam district in Tamil Nadu State of India.
