= Brahmahatya =

Sanskrit term for Brahminicide

Brahmahatya (Sanskrit: ब्रह्महत्या, romanized: Brahmahatyā), also rendered Brahmanahatya (Sanskrit: ब्राह्मणहत्या, romanized: Brāhmaṇahatyā), refers to Brahminicide or killing of a Brahmin, one of the varnas (social classes). The Manusmriti regards the murder of a Brahmin to be one of the five greatest sins (maha patakas).

== Description ==
Brahmahatya refers to the killing of a Brahmin, one of the varnas (social classes) of ancient Hindu society. The Manusmriti regards the murder of a Brahmin to be one of the five greatest sins (maha patakas).

In the Hindu texts such as the Puranas, Brahmahatya is personified as a hideous woman possessing red hair and wearing blue robes, and laughing boisterously, chasing the murderers of Brahmins.

There are other activities (anupatakas) such as murder of a menstruating or pregnant woman, killing of a kshatriya or one who has given a sacrifice, causing harm to a child or causing an abortion, and harming someone who has sought refuge, are mentioned as equivalent to committing Brahmahatya.

== Literature ==
=== Vedic ===
==== Taittirīya Saṃhitā ====
The legend of the Brahmahatyā is first mentioned in the Taittirīya Saṃhitā of the Black Yajurveda:

Indra seized with his hand the guilt of slaying Vishvarupa, and bore it for a year. Creatures called out upon him, 'Thou art a Brahman slayer.' He appealed to the earth, 'Take a third part of my guilt.' She said, 'Let me choose a boon. I deem that I shall be overcome through digging. Let me not be overcome by that.' He replied, 'Before a year is out it will grow up for thee.' Therefore before the year is out the dug-out portion of earth grows up again, for that was what she chose as a boon. She took a third of his guilt. That became a natural fissure; therefore one who has piled up a fire-altar and whose deity is faith should not choose a natural fissure, for that is the colour of guilt. He appealed to the trees, 'Take a third part of my guilt.' They said, 'Let us choose a boon. We deem that we shall be overcome through pruning. Let us not be overcome by that.' He replied, 'From pruning shall more (shoots) spring up for you.' Therefore from the pruning of trees more (shoots) spring up, for that was what they chose as a boon. They took a third part of his guilt, it became sap; therefore one should not partake of sap, for it is the colour of guilt. Or rather of the sap which is red or which comes from the pruning one should not partake, but of other sap at will. He appealed to a concourse of women, 'Take the third of my guilt.' They said, 'Let us choose a boon; let us obtain offspring from after the menses; let us enjoy intercourse at will up to birth.' Therefore women obtain offspring from after the menses, and enjoy intercourse at will up to birth, for that was what they chose as a boon. They took a third of his guilt, it became (a woman) with stained garments.

— Taittirīya Saṃhitā 2.5.1

=== Epic-Puranic ===
In the Hindu epic of Ramayana, when Indra kills Vritra, he incurs the sin of brahmahatya and is immediately paralysed, falling unconscious. The deities arrange for the purification of Indra's sin with the performance of the ashvamedha sacrifice. In the same epic, to expiate Rama's sin of brahmahatya for the killing of Ravana, his wife, Sita, worships a lingam, a form of Shiva, created out of sand at Rameswaram.

The Matsya Purana describes the legend of Shiva taking the form of Bhikshatana. Having decapitated one of Brahma's heads, Shiva incurs the sin of brahmahatya, and the skull of the deity stuck to his palm. For the atonement of this sin, Shiva assumed the guise of a mendicant and wandered across the land until he reached Varanasi, where he achieved redemption.

Hindu texts state that bathing at the water bodies of a tirtha, a Hindu site of pilgrimage, cleanses one of the sin.

== See also ==
- Prāyaścitta
- Vrata
