= Ammapettai block =

Revenue block in Papanasam, Thanjavur, Tamil Nadu, India

The Ammapettai block is a revenue block in the Papanasam taluk of the Thanjavur district in Tamil Nadu, India. It has a totally 46 panchayat villages.

== List of Panchayat Villages ==
| SI.No | Panchayat Village |
|---|---|
| 1 | Agaramangudi |
| 2 | Alangudi |
| 3 | Annappanpettai |
| 4 | Arumalai kottai |
| 5 | Arundavapuram |
| 6 | Devarayanpettai |
| 7 | Edaiyiruppu |
| 8 | Edavakkudi |
| 9 | Irumbuthalai |
| 10 | Jenbagapuram |
| 11 | Kalancheri |
| 12 | Kambarnatham |
| 13 | Karuppamudaliyarkottai |
| 14 | Kathirinatham |
| 15 | Kavalur |
| 16 | Keelakoil Pathu |
| 17 | Kothangudi |
| 18 | Kovathagudi |
| 19 | Kumilakudi |
| 20 | Makimalai |
| 21 | Melakalakudi |
| 22 | Melasemmangudi |
| 23 | Nallavanniyankudikadu |
| 24 | Neduvasal |
| 25 | Neikunnam |
| 26 | Nellithope |
| 27 | Ombathuveli |
| 28 | Palliyur |
| 29 | Perumakkanallur |
| 30 | Poondi |
| 31 | Pulavarnatham |
| 32 | Puliyakudi |
| 33 | Raramuthirakkottai |
| 34 | Saliyamangalam |
| 35 | Serumakkanallur |
| 36 | Sooliyakkottai |
| 37 | Suraikkayur |
| 38 | Thirubuvanam |
| 39 | Thirukkarugavur |
| 40 | Thiruvaiyathukudi |
| 41 | Ukkadai |
| 42 | Vadakkumangudi |
| 43 | Vadapathy |
| 44 | Vaiyacheri |
| 45 | Vembukudi |
| 46 | Viluthiyur |
