= Papanasam block =

Revenue block in Thanjavur, Tamil Nadu, India

Papanasam block is a revenue block in the Papanasam taluk of Thanjavur district, Tamil Nadu, India. There are 34 villages in this block and it is co-extensive with Papanasam taluk.

== List of Panchayat Villages ==
SI.No	Panchayat Village
1	Adhanur
2	Alavandipuram
3	Chakkarapalli
4	Eachankudi
5	Ganapathi Agraharam
6	Gopurajapuram
7	Govindanattucheri
8	Illuppakkorai
9	Kabistalam
10	Konthagai
11	Koonancheri
12	Manalur
13	Melakabisthalam
14	Olaipadi
15	Pandaravadai
16	Pasupathikoil
17	Perumalkoil
18	Rajagiri
19	Ramanujapuram
20	Regunathapuram
21	Sarabhojirajapuram
22	Sarukkai
23	Sathiyamangalam
24	Someswarapuram
25	Soolamangalam
26	Thirumandangudi
27	Thiruvaigavur
28	Thiyagasamudram
29	Thurumbur
30	Ullikkadai
31	Umayalpuram
32	Umbalapadi
33	Valuthoor
34	Veeramangudi
