= Papanasam (disambiguation) =

Papanasam is a town in Thanjavur district in the Indian state of Tamil Nadu. It may also refer to:

- Papanasa (lit. 'destroyer of sin/evil'), epithet of the Hindu deities Shiva and Vishnu

== Film ==
- Papanasam (film), an Indian Tamil-language thriller film by Jeethu Joseph featuring Kamal Haasan

== Places ==
- Papanasam taluk, a taluk in Thanjavur district in the Indian state of Tamil Nadu
- Papanasam block, a revenue block in the Papanasam taluk of Thanjavur district in the Indian state of Tamil Nadu
- Papanasam (State Assembly Constituency), a state assembly constituency in the Indian state of Tamil Nadu
- Papanasam, Tirunelveli, a famous picnic spot in Tirunelveli district in the Indian state of Tamil Nadu
- Papanasam Dam, a dam in Tirunelveli district in the Indian state of Tamil Nadu
- Varkala Beach, a beach in Varkala, in the Indian state of Kerala

== People ==
- Papanasam Sivan (1890-1973), a prominent composer of Carnatic music and a singer
