= Thirukkarugavur =

- village
- Interactive map of Thirukkarugavur
- Country: India
- State: Tamil Nadu
- District: Thanjavur
- Taluk: Papanasam

Population (2001)
  - Total: 1,715

Languages
  - Official: Tamil
- Time zone: UTC+5:30 (IST)

Thirukkarugavur is a village in the Papanasam taluk of Thanjavur district, Tamil Nadu, India.

== Demographics ==
As per the 2001 census, Thirukkarugavur had a total population of 1715 with 850 males and 865 females. The literacy rate was 69.15.

== Nearest places ==
Arundavapuram-14.2 km

Kambarnatham-13.2 km

Thirubuvanam-22 km

== Temples ==
Thirukkarugavur is famous for Garbharakshambigai Temple dedicated to Lord Shiva. This temple is situated on the banks of Vettar River.
