= Regunathapuram =

Regunathapuram may refer to:

- Regunathapuram, Papanasam, a village in Papanasam taluk, Thanjavur district, Tamil Nadu, India
- Regunathapuram, Pattukkottai, a village in Pattukkottai taluk, Thanjavur district, Tamil Nadu, India
- Regunathapuram, Pudukkottai, a village in Karambakudi taluk, Pudukkottai district, Tamil Nadu, India

== See also ==
- Raghunathapuram, Nalgonda district, a village in Nalgonda district, India
