= Valathur =

Valuthur
- village
- Country: India
- State: Tamil Nadu
- District: Thanjavur
- Taluk: Papanasam

Population (2001)
  - Total: 5,016

Languages
  - Official: Tamil
- Time zone: UTC+5:30 (IST)

Valuthur is a village in the Papanasam taluk of Thanjavur district, Tamil Nadu, India.

== Demographics ==
As per the 2001 census, Valathur had a total population of 5016 with 2356 males and 2560 females. The sex ratio was 1129. The literacy rate was 75.95 percent.
