= Ayyampettai, Thanjavur =

Ayyampettai Ayyampet
- Panchayat
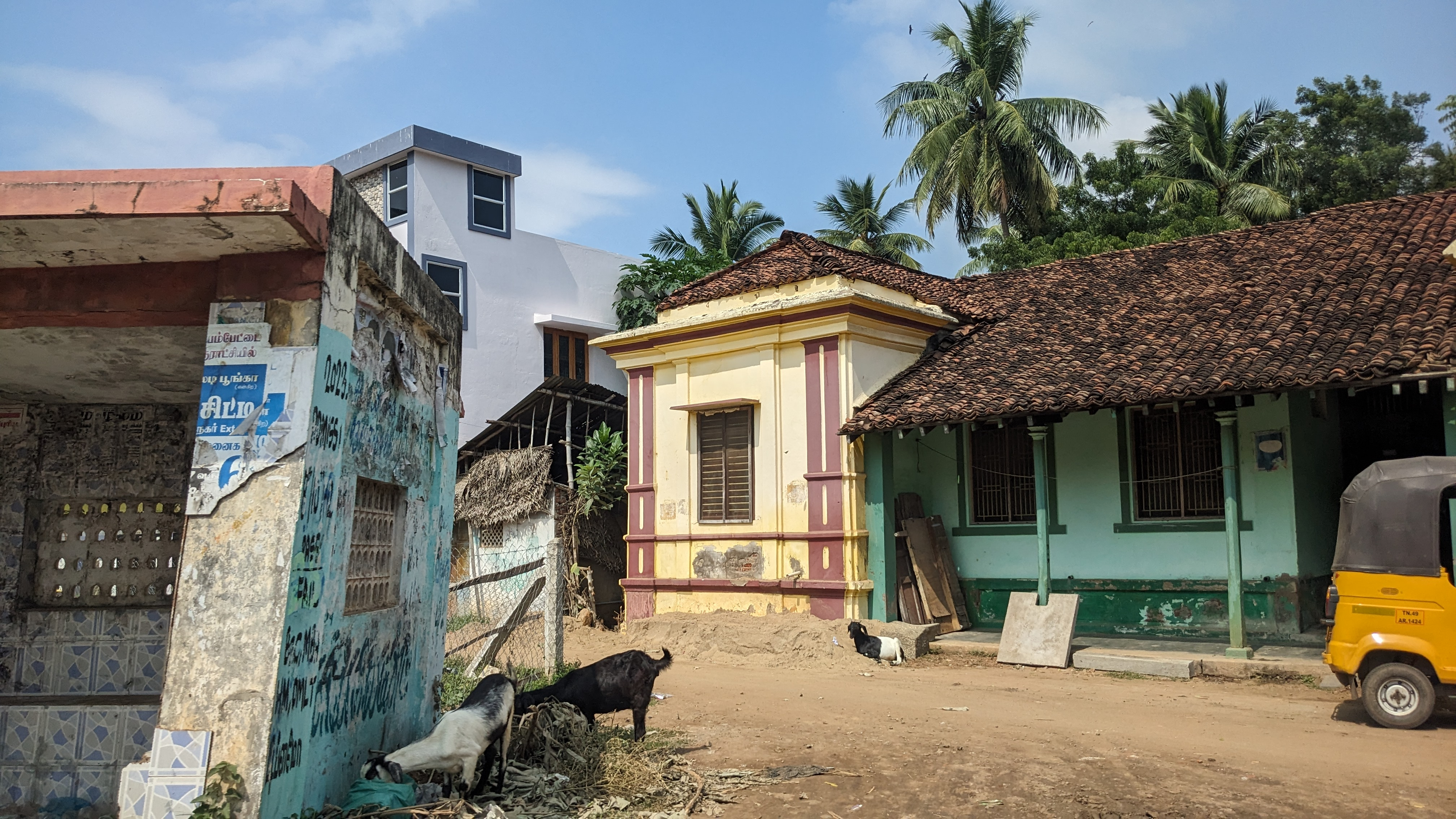
- The front of a vernacular Tanjorean house in Ayyampet.

- Ayyampettai, Thanjavur district, Tamil Nadu
- Coordinates: 10.8962°N 79.1943°E
- Country: India
- State: Tamil Nadu
- District: Thanjavur
- Taluk: Papanasam

Area
  - Total: 7.73 km^{2} (2.98 sq mi)
- Elevation: 57.53 m (188.7 ft)

Population (2011)
  - Total: 16,263
  - Density: 2,100/km^{2} (5,450/sq mi)

Languages
  - Official: Tamil
- Time zone: UTC+5:30 (IST)
- PIN: 614201, 614211
- Telephone code: +914374******
- Vehicle registration: TN 68

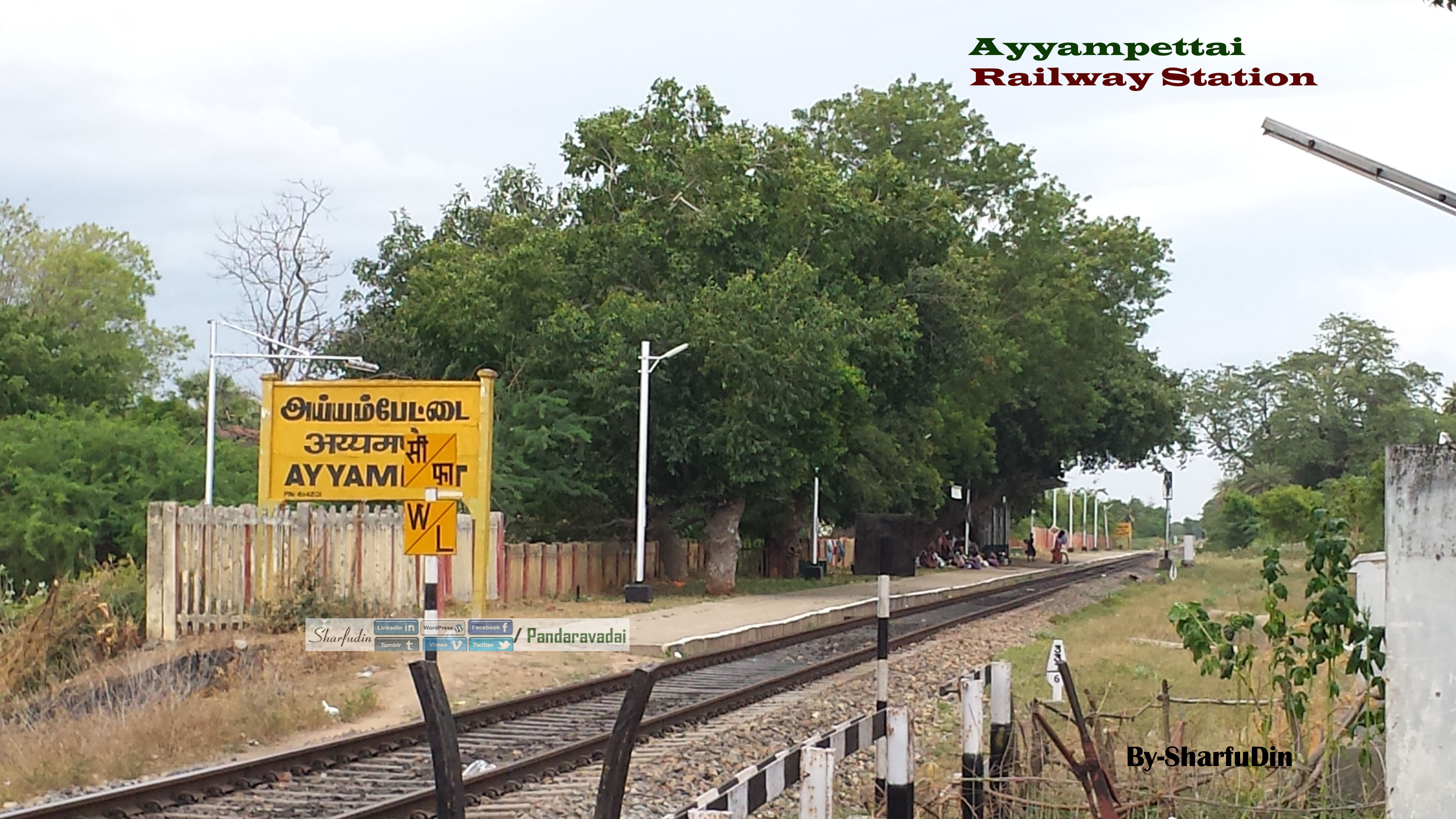
Ayyampettai Railway Station between Thiruchirapalli and Mayiladuthurai Junction

Ayyampettai, or Ayyampet, is a panchayat town located in the Thanjavur district of the state of Tamil Nadu, India. It is located 15 km from Thanjavur and 24 km from Kumbakonam.

Chakkarapalli, Pasupathikoil, Valuthoor, Vadakkumangudi, Pattukudi and Illuppakkorai villages are near to this town.

Ayyampet was a significant cotton, woollen and silk rugs manufacturing centre until the 20th century, producing items known as Tanjore carpets or rugs. Similarly, the town was an historic weaving centre.

== Geography ==
Ayyampettai is located at 10.896544°N 79.188978°E. It has an average elevation of 116 feet.

== Demographics ==
Ayyampettai Town Panchayat has a population of 16,263 of which 7,593 are males while 8,670 are females as per report released by Census India 2011. The population of children aged 0–6 is 1767 which is 10.87% of total population of Ayyampettai (TP). In Ayyampettai Town Panchayat, the female sex ratio is 1142 against state average of 996. Moreover, the child sex ratio in Ayyampettai is around 1001 compared to Tamil Nadu state average of 943. The literacy rate of Ayyampettai city is 89.02% higher than the state average of 80.09%. In Ayyampettai, male literacy is around 93.32% while the female literacy rate is 85.31%.

== Politics ==
=== State Assembly Constituency ===
Ayyampettai is the part of Papanasam State Assembly Constituency

=== Lok sabha Constituency ===
Ayyampettai is the part of Mayiladuthurai Lok sabha Constituency

== Transport ==
=== Bus stands ===
Anna Silai Bus stop is the starting point of this town while you travel from Thanjavur - Kumbakonam. service provided by town bus and Mini bus.

Ayyampettai Bus stop is the Primary Bus stop located near by the Government Higher secondary school Ayyampettai. Ayyampettai is well connected with roads between the Highway of Thanjavur - Kumbakonam. All sorts of Buses provide service here.

Mathagadi Bus Stop is located middle of this town near ayyampettai to Ganapathi agrahaaram road starting point. Here only Town buses and Mini buses services.

Koviladi Bus Stop is located near chakkarapalli. All bus services here except Point to Point and express buses

Chakkarapalli Bus stop is the end point of this town while you travel from Thanjavur - Kumbakonam. service provided by town bus and Mini bus

=== Railway Station ===
Ayyampet railway station is located towards Aaharamangudi Road near Anjuman mosque. The town also has rail connectivity between Thiruchirapalli - Mayiladuthurai via Thanjavur and Kumbakonam.

=== Airport ===
The nearest airport is Tiruchirappalli International Airport, located 64.3 km (39.9 miles) away from the town.

=== Seaport ===
The nearest seaport is Karaikal Port, which is 81.1 km (50.3 miles) away from Ayyampettai

== Education ==
=== Schools ===
- Government Higher secondary school, Ayyampettai
- Government High School, Ayyampettai
- Panchayat Union Middle School, Ayyampettai
- Star Lions Matriculation higher secondary school
- Al-Mubeen Matriculation higher secondary school
- Anjuman Matriculation higher secondary school
- Modern School, Ayyampettai
- City School, Ayyampettai
- zara school
- Sri Madhura Natiyalaya, Ayyampettai
- Sri vishvaksena Thanjavur art gallery and art school, ayyampet

== Association ==
Paasamalar Welfare Association
Samuganeedhi Welfare Association

Religion Hindu
