= Pattukudi =

Coordinates: 10°56′N 79°11′E

- Village
- Pattukudi village
- Interactive map of Pattukudi
- Country: India
- State: Tamil Nadu
- District: Thanjavur
- Taluk: Papanasam

Government
  - Type: Panchayati Raj
  - Body: Panchayati raj
- Demonym: Pattukudian

Languages
  - Official: Tamil
- Time zone: UTC+5:30 (IST)
- Postal code: 614202

Pattukudi is a small village near Ayyampettai in Thanjavur district in the Indian state of Tamil Nadu. The village is administered by the Puthur Panchayat Board of Papanasam taluk, Tamil Nadu. The majority of the people in Pattukudi are from the Moopanars community and travel to the nearby village Ganapathy Agraharam, Ayyampettai, Thiruvaiyaru, for their basic needs.

== Location ==
It is located two kilometers inside the State Highway connecting Kumbakonam and Thiruvaiyaru and about 1,230 miles (1,980 km) south of New Delhi, the country's capital. It is located on the banks of the Kollidam River, which is located at the back side of the village. The road to this small village starts from the place named "Vizhithiru Rajapuram" or "Kandagarayam" in State Highway Connection Kumbakonam and Thiruvaiyaru. On the front side of the village is a branch river from Cauvery named "Mannai" River.

There is a government school educating students from first standard to fifth standard. Most of the people prefer to go outwards from this village for their livelihood.
