= Tiruvaikavur =

Coordinates: 10°59′N 79°17′E

Tiruvaikavur Thiruvaikavur
- village
- Interactive map of Tiruvaikavur
- Country: India
- State: Tamil Nadu
- District: Thanjavur
- Taluk: Papanasam

Government
  - Type: Panchayati raj (India)
  - Body: Gram panchayat

Population (2001)
  - Total: 4,622

Languages
  - Official: Tamil
- Time zone: UTC+5:30 (IST)

Thiruvaikavur is a village in the Papanasam taluk of Thanjavur district, Tamil Nadu, India. The village is famous for the Tiruvaikavur temple.

== Demographics ==
As per the 2001 census, Thiruvaikavur had a total population of 4622 with 2306 males and 2316 females. The sex ratio was 1004. The literacy rate was 60.63.
