= Garbharakshambigai Temple =

Hindu temple in Tamil Nadu, India

Garbarakshambigai Temple
- Thirukkarugavoor
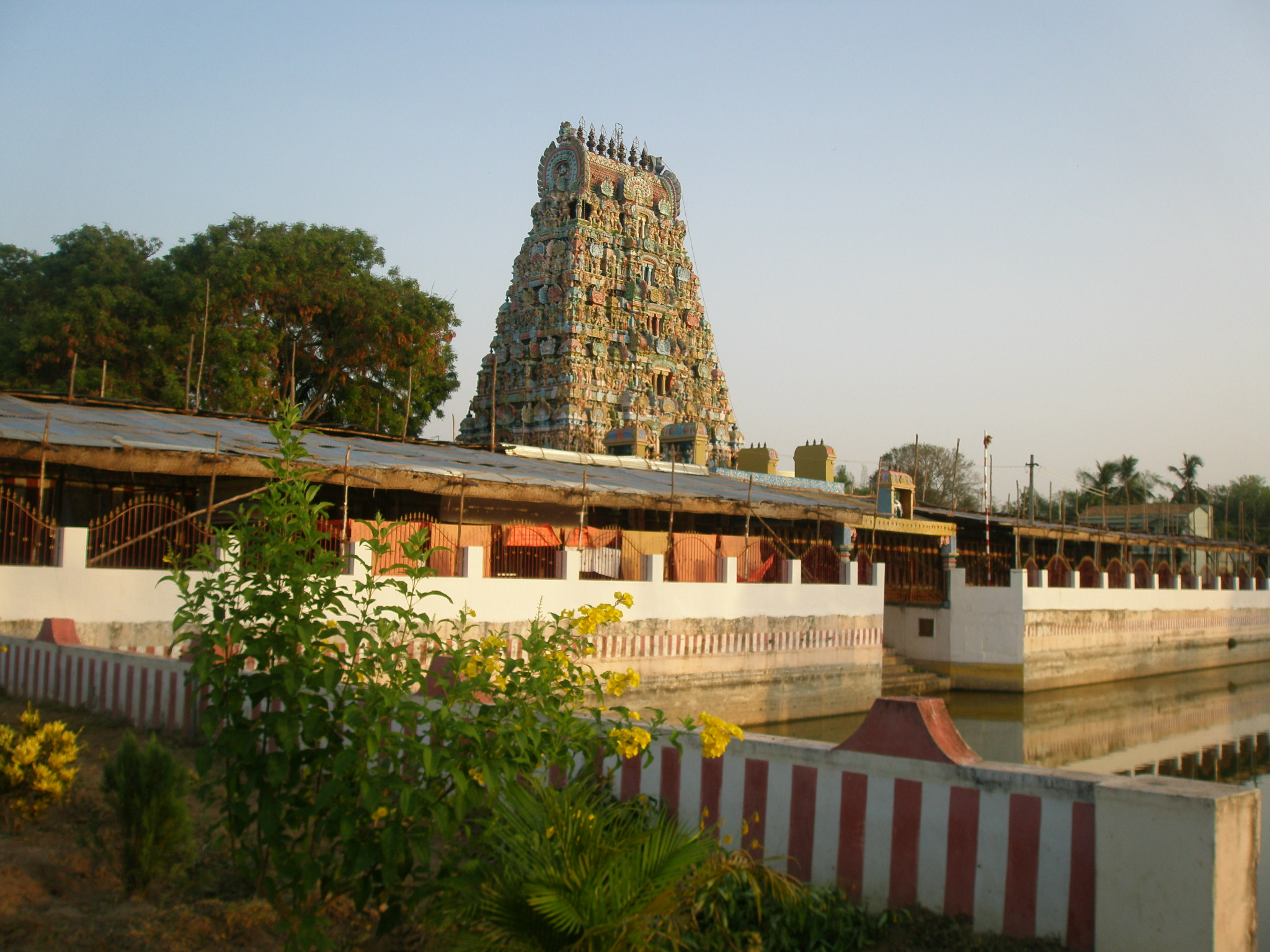

- Location in Tamil Nadu

Religion
- Affiliation: Hinduism
- District: Thanjavur
- Deity: Mullaivananathar (Shiva) Garbharakshambigai (Parvathi)
- Festivals: Vaikasi Visagam, Navarathiri
- Features: Temple tank: Ksheera Kundam (Milk Pond)

Location
- Location: Papanasam
- State: Tamil Nadu
- Country: India
- Coordinates: 10°52′5″N 79°16′32″E

Architecture
- Type: Tamilan architecture
- Completed: 6th century
- Direction of façade: East
- Inscriptions: 31

Website
- https://garbarakshambigaitemple.com/

Garbharakshambigai Temple is a Hindu temple dedicated to Shiva located in Thirukarukavoor, Tamil Nadu, India. The temple is located 7 km (4.3 mi) south of Papanasam, 20 km (12 mi) south west of Kumbakonam, 10 km (6.2 mi) north of Saliyamangalam, 20 km (12 mi) north east of Thanjavur and on the southern bank of Vettar River. Nearest railway station is Papanasam Railway Station, which is 6.7 km from the temple. Temple is also located very close (3 km) to National Highways 36 connecting Thanjavur and Kumbakonam, making it easily accessible by road also. Constructed in the Chola style of architecture, the temple is believed to have been built during the Cholas period in the 7th century. Shiva is worshipped as Mullaivananathar and his consort Parvathi as Garbharakshambigai.

The presiding deity is revered in the 7th-century Tamil Saiva canonical work, the Tevaram, written by Tamil saint poets known as the Nayanmars and classified as Paadal Petra Sthalam. A granite wall surrounds the temple, enclosing all its shrines. The temple has a five-tiered Rajagopuram, the gateway tower.

The temple is open from 6 am - 1 pm and 4 pm - 8:00 pm on all days. Six daily rituals and three yearly festivals are held at the temple, of which the Vaikasi Visagam for Mullaivananathar, Adipooram and Navarathri uthsavam for Ambal, Annabishekam, Kanthasashti, Karthigai Mahadeepam, Karthigai Sunday theerthavari and Panguni Uthram are some of the prominent festivals celebrated. Abhishekam using 1008 conches is performed to Lord Shiva on all Sundays in the Tamil month of Karthikai (Nov-Dec). The temple is maintained and administered by the Hindu Religious and Endowment Board of the Government of Tamil Nadu. Garbharakshambigai is believed to have saved a fetus of her devotee (Vedhikai, wife of Sage Nithruvan) and hence the temple is frequented by people praying for child birth.

== Legend ==
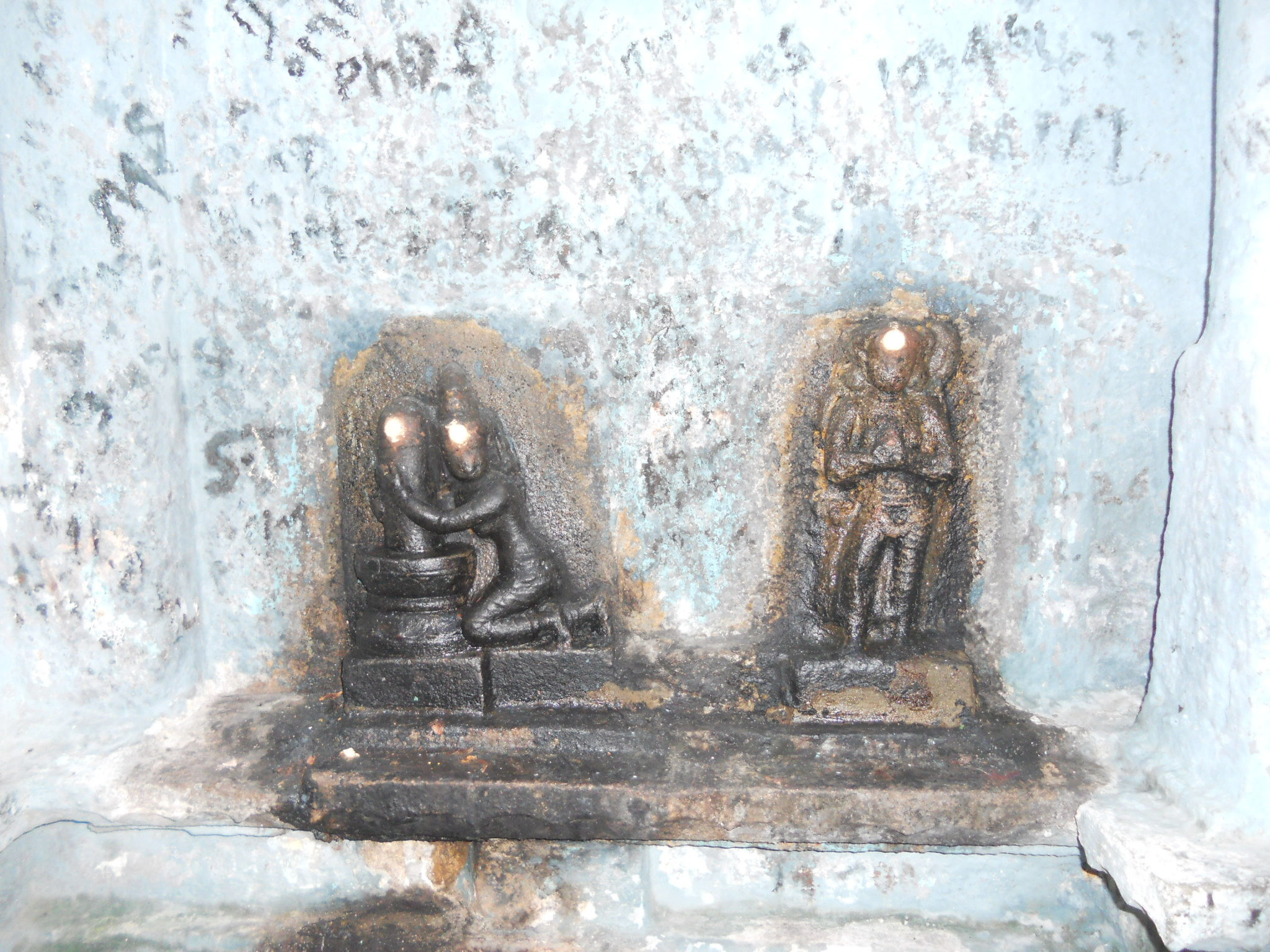
Sculpture indicating the legend

The place is also called Tirukalavur, Mullaivanam, Mathavipuram and Garabapuri. Since Mathavi is the temple tree, it is called Mathavipuram (Mullaivanam); Karu means fetus, Ka means to save, and oor mean village - Since the fetus is believed to be saved by the temple deity, the village is called Tirukarukavoor. As per Hindu legend, a sage named Niruthuvar was living near the banks of river Vennar along with his wife Vedikai. One day, when the sage went out, another sage named Orthuvapathar arrived at their house seeking food. Vedika was pregnant then and due to tiredness, she was taking time to bring food. Orthuvapathar felt that the lady inside the house was humiliating him and he cursed her due to which the fetus was killed. Vedikai prayed to Ambigai for relief, who appeared as Garbharakshambigai and protected the fetus in a pot. The child was born at the right time, who was named Naithruvan. From then on, the presiding deity is worshiped by people seeking child birth.

== History ==
The temple has 31 inscriptions dating from the Chola period from the reigns of Koperi Varman, Rajaraja I, Rajendra Chola I and Kulothunga Chola. The inscriptions record the grants of the temple by the kings. The inscriptions are found on the walls of the temple, sanctum and also in the halls. The inscriptions are recorded in numbers 100, 102 and 110 in South Indian Inscriptions, Volume III, Part III. The inscription from the 21st year of Parantaka I records the grant of 1.5 veli of land (roughly 6 acres of land) by an individual named Vilayanattevan for maintaining ghee lamps of the temple. Another inscription from the 20th regnal year of the same king indicates a donation of 13 veli (roughly 52 acres of land) by a devotee named Tiruchitrambala Udayar to meet the expenses of the temple. The temple has additions from various ruling empires during the subsequent eras. The temple is maintained and administered by the Hindu Religious and Endowment Board of the Government of Tamil Nadu.

== Architecture ==
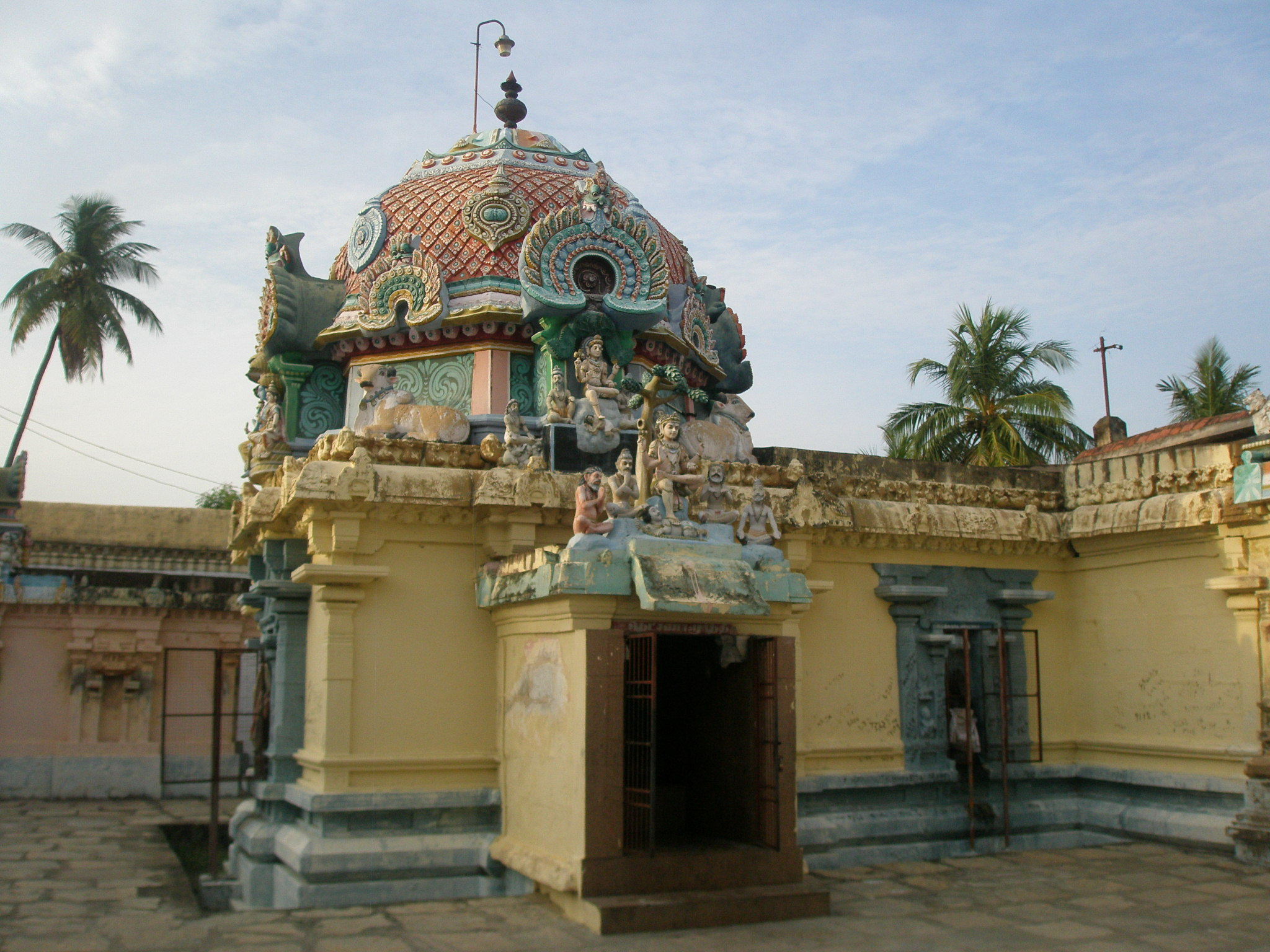
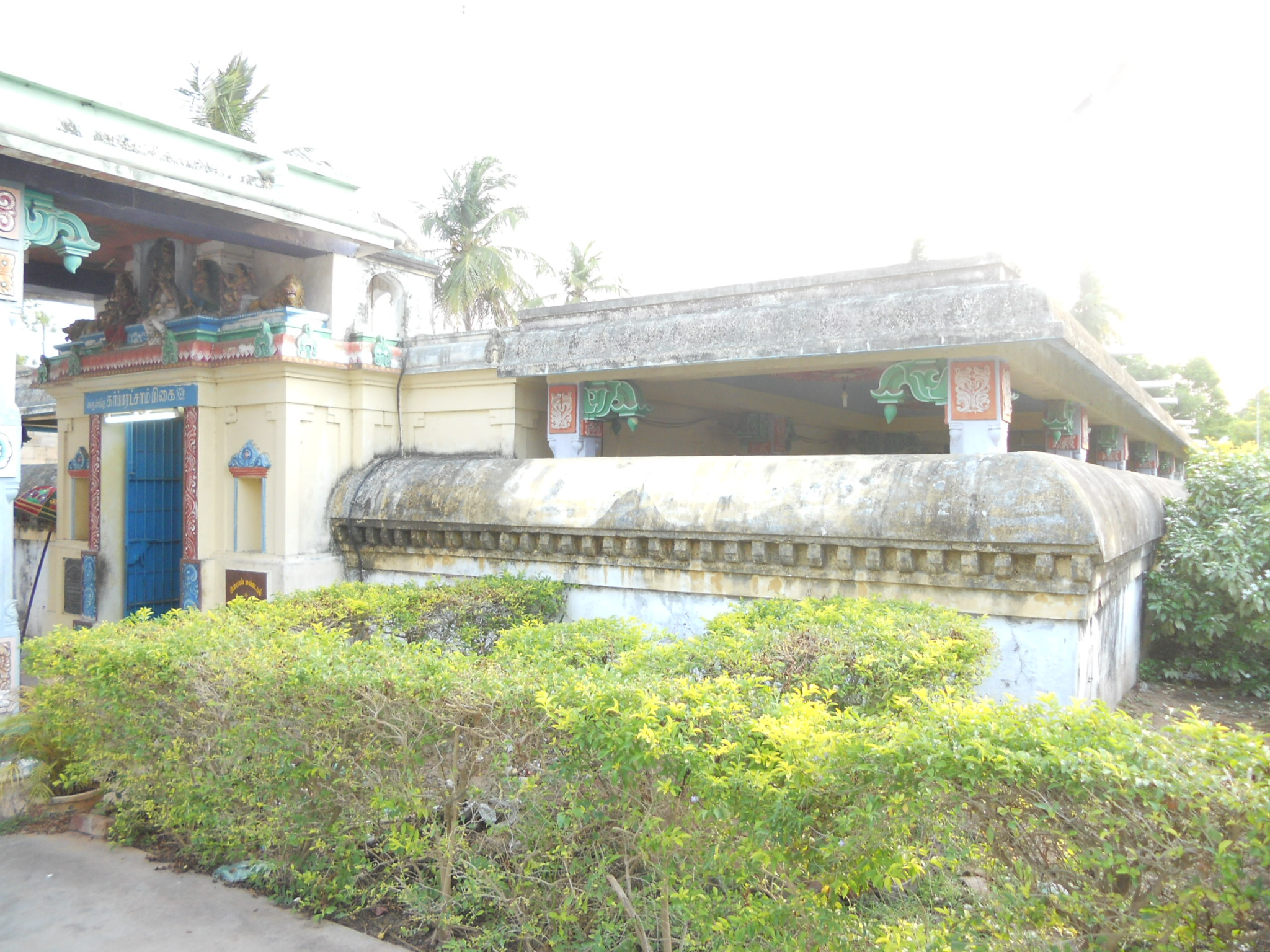
Shrines within the temple

Thirukarukavoor Temple is dedicated to Shiva and is located near Papanasam, Thanjavur, Tamil Nadu, India. The nearest railway station is in Papanasam, about 3 kilometres from the place. The nearest airport is in Trichy. Thirukarukavoor is situated in Thirukkarugavur, a village located on the banks of Vettar River, a tributary of River Cauveri. People from Chennai and northern parts of Tamil Nadu may reach Kumbakonam and from there to Thirukarukavoor. People from east and southern parts of Tamil Nadu must reach Thanjavur and from there to Thirukarukavoor. The temple is one of the prominent and most visited temples in the district. The temple has a 5-tier Rajagopuram and an outer prakaram(closed precincts of a temple). The temple is 460 ft by 284 ft and has a gopuram facing east and also has an entrance facing south. There is a garden in the southern side and a Vasantha Mandapam in the north. The sanctum of Mullaivananathar is in the second precinct and the shrine of Amman is located parallel to the Swami shrine. The shrine is Nandi is located in front of Swami, with the Palipeeda and Dwajasthambam located right behind the Nandi. There is a Nataraja hall and a yagasalai. There are separate shrines for Nataraja, Somaskanda, Karpaga Vinayagar and Navagrahas. There are separate shrines for Sekkizhar, Nalvar, Santhanachariar, Dakshinamurthy, Nrithivu Nayakkar, Arthanariswarar, Mahalakshmi, Arumugam, Brahma, Durga and Chandikeswarar. There are four water bodies associated with the temple. Sheerakundam (Parkulam) is the temple tank located opposite to the temple and the water is believed to be born out of the milk of Kamadenu, the sacred cow. Sathyakupam is a well located in between the shrines of Swami and Amman. Brahma Theertham is a tank located north east of the temple - Nataraja gives theerthavari during Karthigai Thivatharai in this tank. Vritha Kaveri is the branch of Kaveri, Vettaru (also called Mullivay) - the stepshore is the bank for many of the temple occasions. The temple tree, Mullai tree is located in between the Swami shrine and Chandikeswarar shrine. In 2020, a hall for Annadhanam was added by the Hindu Religious and Endowment Department, by the Government of Tamil Nadu.

== Religious significance ==
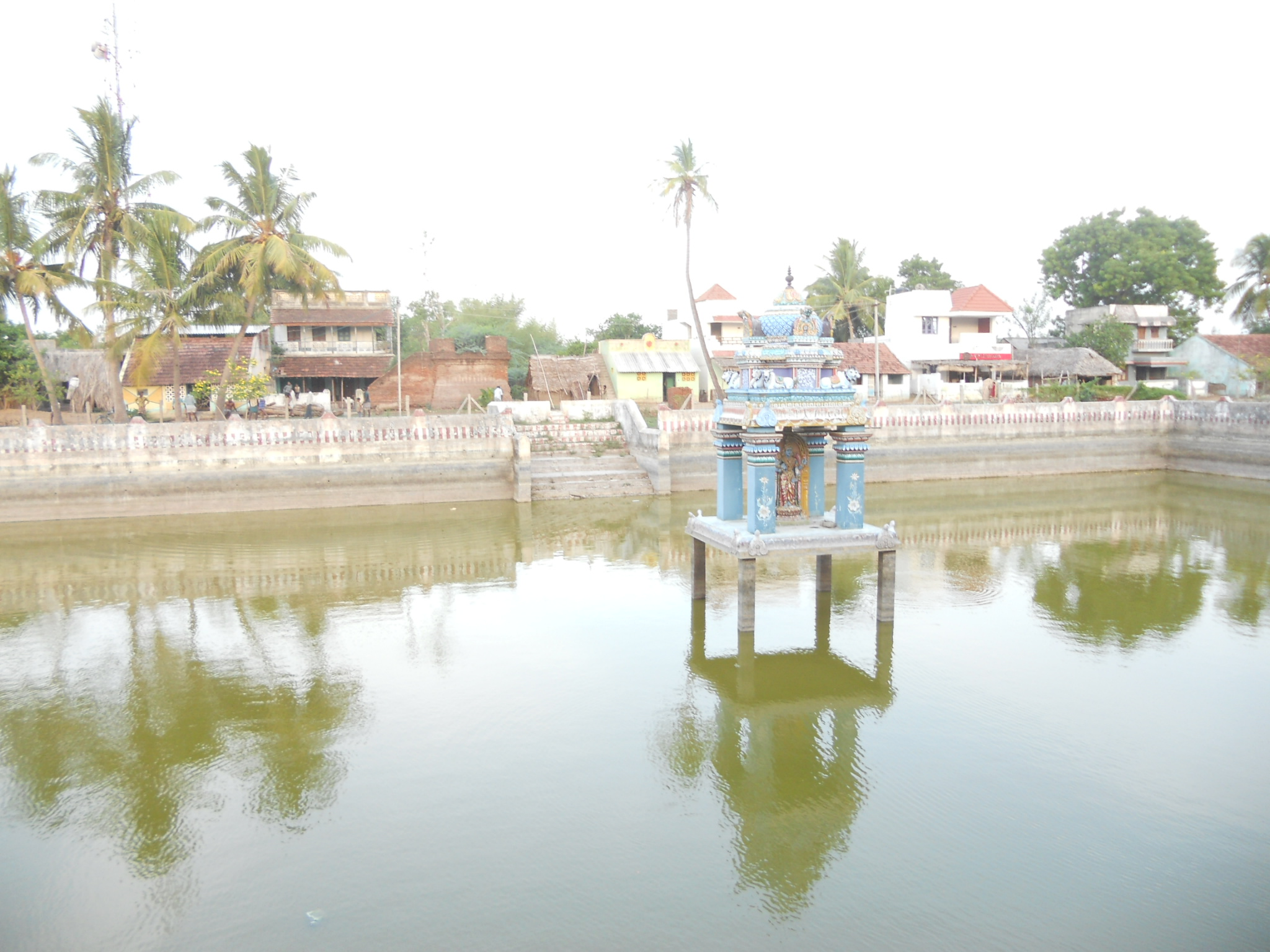
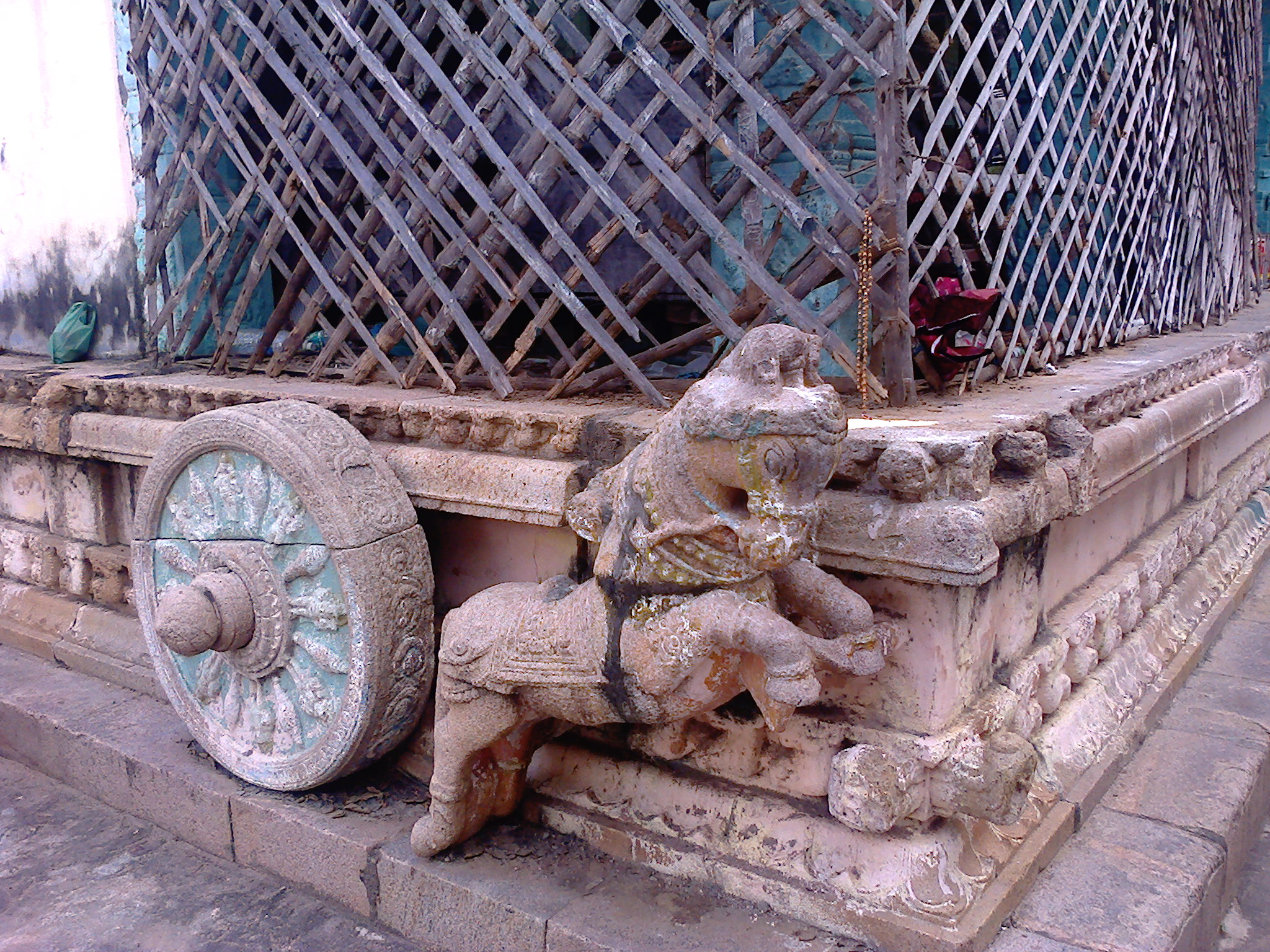
Sculptures and temple tank

The temple finds mention in Tevaram, the 7th century 12 volume Saiva canonical work by Tamil saints, namely Appar, Sundarar and Campantar. It is one of the shrines of the 275 Paadal Petra Sthalams glorified in the Saiva canon. The temple also finds mention in Periya Puranam by Sezhkizhar, Siva Ksehtra Sivanamaga Kalivenba by Umapathi Sivam and Vinnapakali Venba by Ramalinga Adigal. Thalapuranam by Ambalavana Pandaram, Nanmaimalai & Rettaimanimalai by Veerabathra swamigal, Pathirru Panthathi by Govindaswami Pillai, Vadamozhi Slogangal by Anatharama Dikshithar and Amman thothirangal Tamilpattu by T.S. Vaithiyanathan are some of the religious works associated with the temple. The temple is one of the five Pancha Aranya Sthalams, the temples named after forest. Aranyam means forest and the following five temples at different forests Thanjavur / Kumbakonam / Thiruvarur region are revered as "Pancha Aranya Sthalams".The five temples are Mullaivananathar Temple at Tirukkarugavur – Mullai vanam, Satchi Nathar Temple at Avalivanallur – Paadhiri vanam, Paathaaleswarar Temple at Thiru Aradaipperumpazhi (Haridwara mangalam) – Vanni vanam, Aapathsahayeswarar Temple at Thiru Erumpoolai (Alangudi) – Poolai vanam and Vilvavaneswarar Temple at Thirukollam Pudhur – Vilva vanam. Vaikasi Visagam for Mullaivananathar, Adipooram and Navarathri uthsavam for Ambal, Annabishekam, Kanthasashti, Karthigai Mahadeepam, Karthigai Sunday theerthavari and Panguni Uthram are some of the prominent festivals celebrated.
