= Vembukudi =

Vembukudi may refer to places in India:

- Vembukudi, Ariyalur, Tamil Nadu
- Vembukudi, Thanjavur, Tamil Nadu
