= Jakath Rakshaka Perumal temple =

Perumal temple in Thanjavur district, Tamil Nadu, India

Jagad Rakshaka Perumal Temple
- Thirukkodaloor
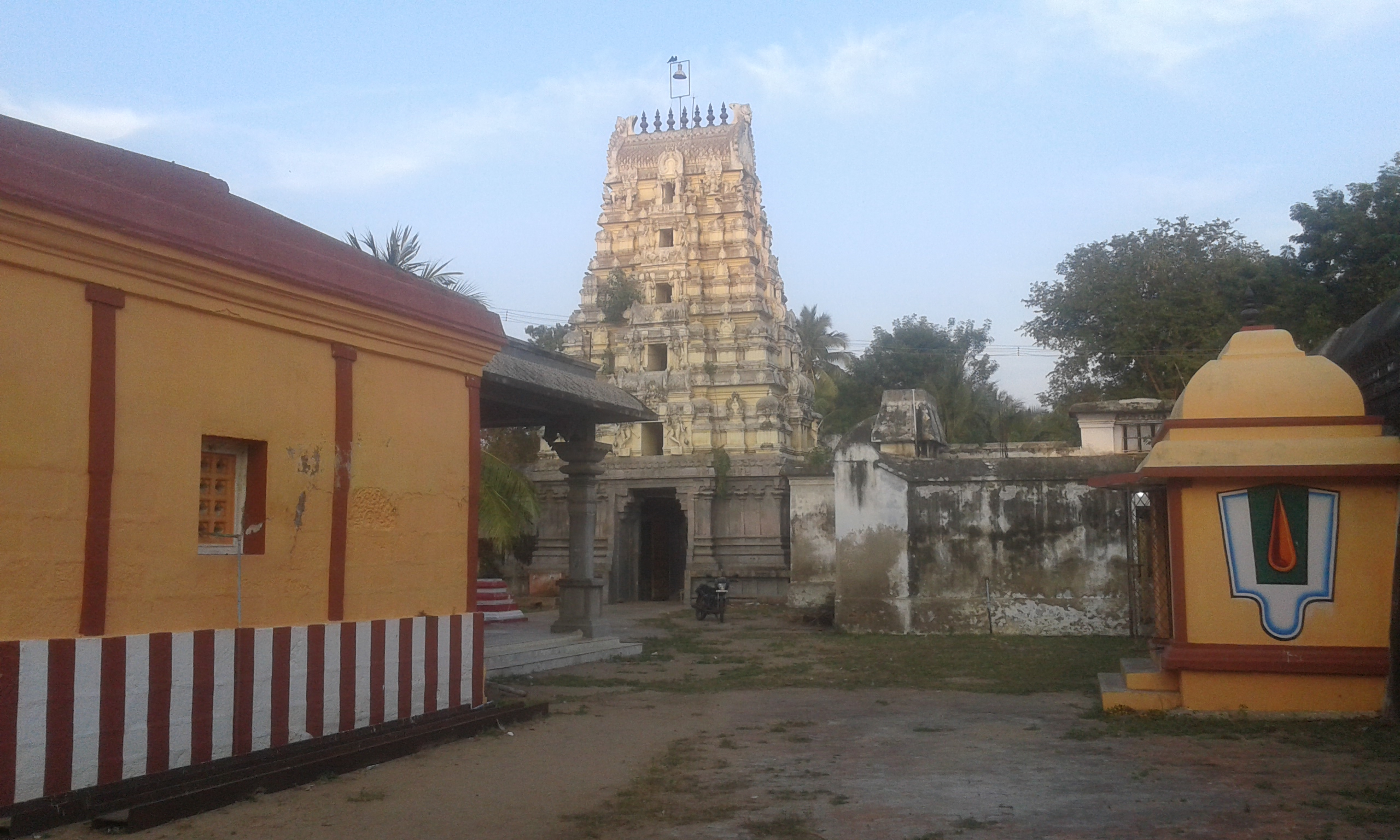

- Location in Tamil Nadu

Religion
- Affiliation: Hinduism
- District: Thanjavur
- Deity: Jagad Rakshaka Perumal (Vishnu); Pushpavalli Thayar (Lakshmi)
- Features: Tower: Suddha Satwa Vimanam

Location
- Location: Vadakurangaduthurai, Kumbakonam
- State: Tamil Nadu
- Country: India
- Coordinates: 10°55′31″N 79°12′12″E

Architecture
- Type: Dravidian architecture

The Jagad Rakshaka Perumal Temple or Thirukoodalur (locally called Aduthurai Perumal Temple) in Vadakurangaduthurai, a village in the outskirts of Kumbakonam in the Indian state of Tamil Nadu, is dedicated to the Hindu god Vishnu. Constructed in the Dravidian style of architecture, the temple is mentioned in the Nalayira Divya Prabandham, the early medieval Tamil canon of the Alvar saints from the 6th–9th centuries CE. It is one of the 108 Divya Desams dedicated to Vishnu, who is worshipped as Jakath Rakshaka and his consort Lakshmi as Pushpavalli.

The temple is believed to have been built by the Medieval Cholas of the late 8th century CE, with later contributions from Vijayanagara kings and Madurai Nayaks. A brick wall surrounds the temple, enclosing all its shrines and bodies of water.

Jakath Rakshaka is believed to have appeared to the sage Nandaka and King Ambarisha. The temple is maintained and administered by the Hindu Religious and Endowment Board of the Government of Tamil Nadu.

== Etymology ==
As per Hindu mythology, the asura Hiranyaksha abducted Bhumi, the goddess of the earth, and travelled to the netherworld, called Patala. Vishnu assumed the incarnation of Varaha, an avatar in the form of a boar to travel to Patala. He split the earth into two parts, and according to the region's sthala purana, brought the two back at Srimushnam. Thirumangai Alvar quotes the incident and calls the village as Pugunthaan Oor, meaning the place where Vishnu went inside the earth. Since Vishnu protected the world here, he is called Jagad Rakshaka Perumal (in Tamil as Vaiyam Katha Perumal). The gap seen in the sanctum close to the image of Jagad Rakshaka is believed to be the centre point of earth and all devas came together to worship him. Since it brought all of them together, an act referred in Tamil as koodal, the village is called Thirukoodalur.

== Legend ==
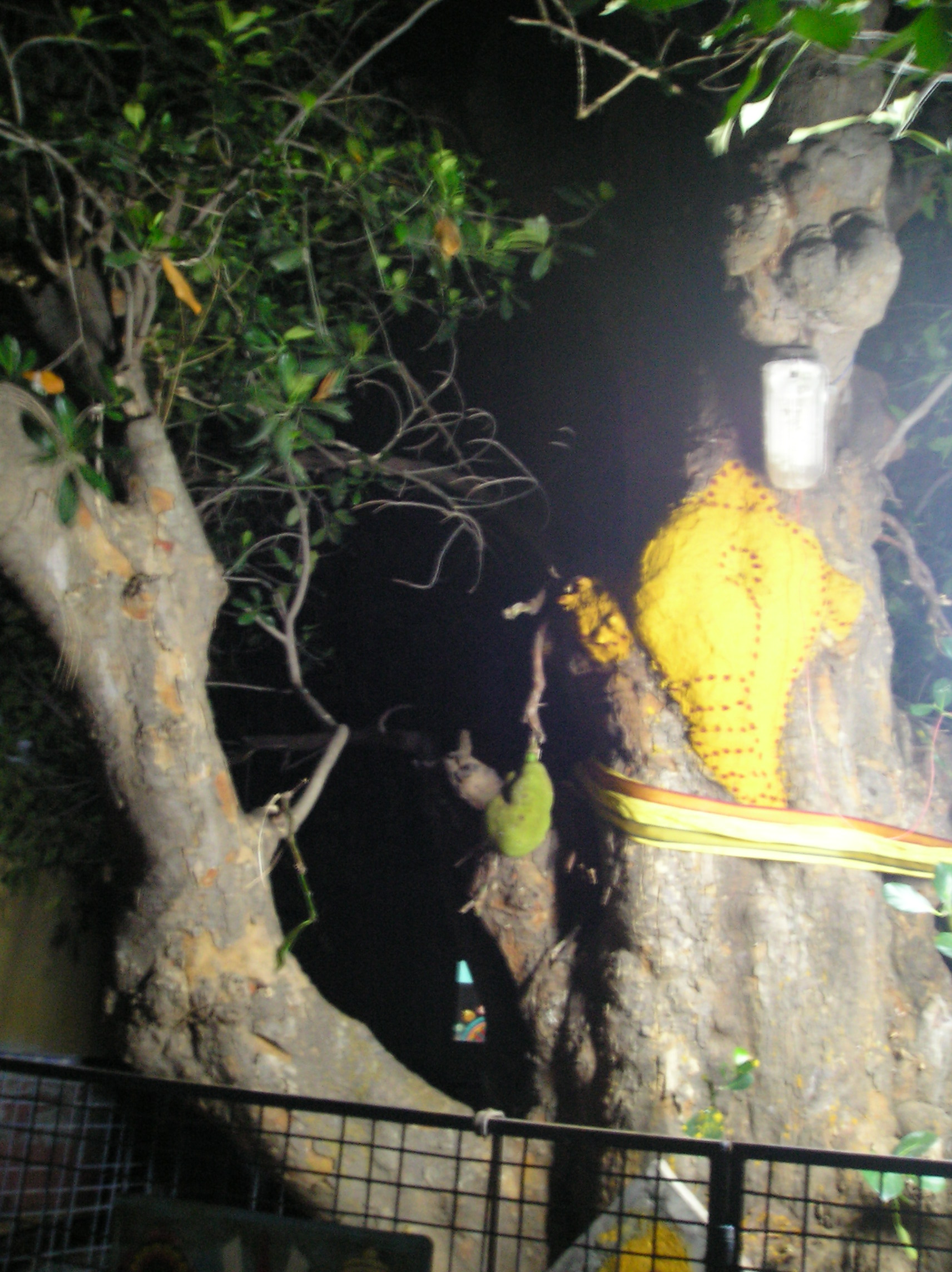
Temple Sthala Vriksham(Temple tree)

As per Hindu legend, King Ambarisha who immersed himself in the worship of Vishnu, failed to strengthen his army and lost his kingdom. While doing worship, he also did not observe the sage Durvasa who went along his way. The sage got irritated and cursed the king. The king went to Vishnu for rescue, who sent his discus to chase the sage. The sage surrendered to Vishnu and begged pardon. The king Ambarishan is believed to have built the temple and hence the presiding deity is also called Ambarisha Varadhar at this place.

As per another legend, all rivers come to river Kaveri for cleansing themselves. Kaveri wanted to cleanse herself and approached Hindu god Brahma. She is believed to have worshipped Vishnu at this place and got relieved. A parrot which was devoted to Vishnu was shot down in the nearby forest. Vishnu rescued the parrot and appeased him of his previous birth. Thus it is believed that Vishnu descends here for all forms of life. Vishnu is also believed to have appeared for sage Nandaka. Since all sages came here and prayed to Vishnu, the place is called Koodalaur (Koodal means group). The temple is called Vaiyam Katha Perumal as the presiding deity is believed to have saved the world.

== Architecture ==
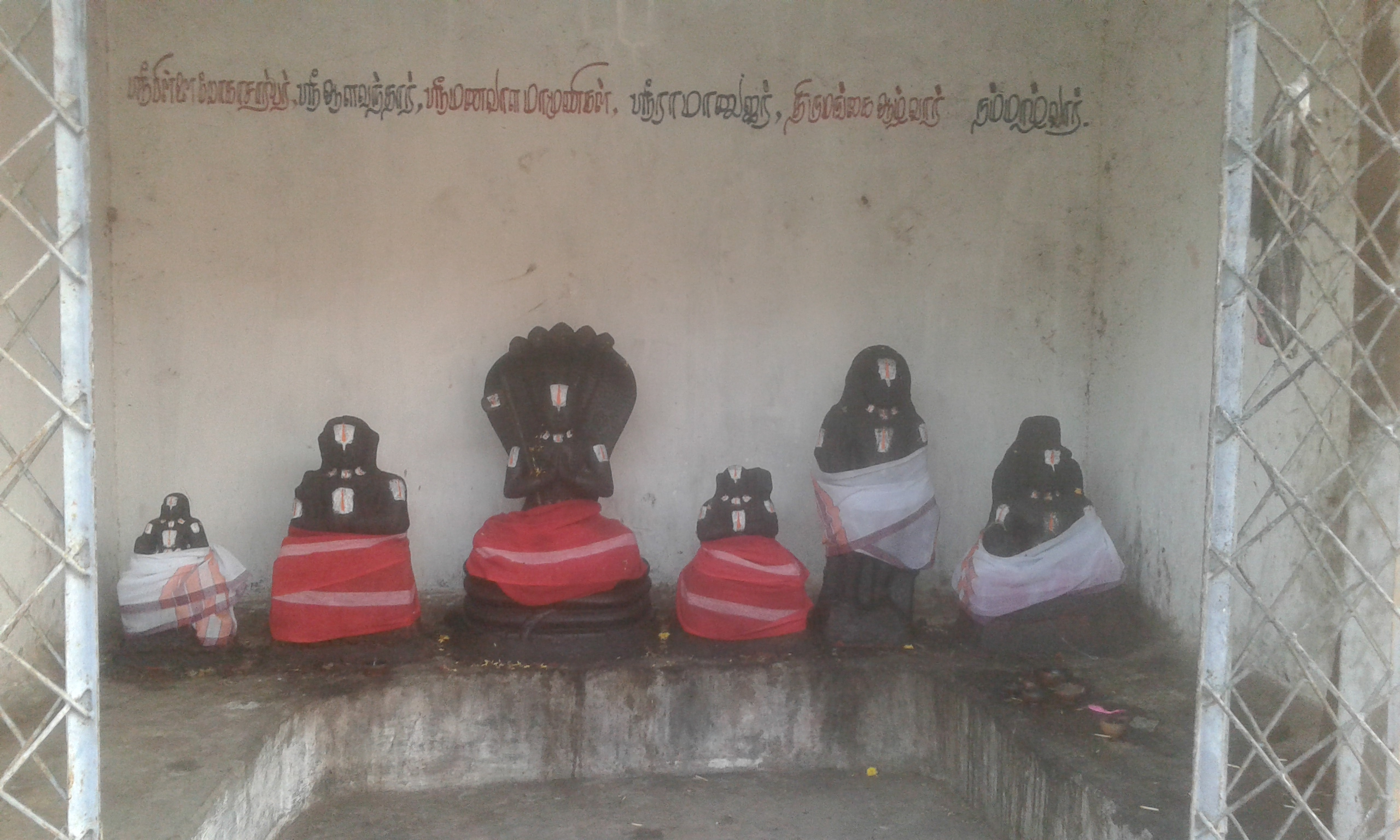
Image of Alvars and shrines

The temple is located four miles away from Ayyampet and is located on Kumbakonam - Tiruvayyaru Road. The temple is believed to have been built by the Medieval Cholas of the late 8th century CE, with later contributions from Vijayanagara kings and Madurai Nayaks. A brick wall surrounds the temple, enclosing all its shrines and bodies of water. The central shrine has the image of Jakath Rakshaka Perumal in standing posture. The shrine of the Pushpavalli faces South. The temple has a 3-tiered rajagopuram (gateway tower). There are separate shrines for Ramanuja, Alvars, Andal and Garuda. The vimana, the tower above the sanctum, is called Suddha Satwa Vimana. A chariot called Ambarisha Ratha, renovated by Rani Mangammal, was in use until the 1940s, after which it was not used. There is a statue of the queen in the temple.

== Religious significance ==
Jagad Rakshaka is considered the saviour deity and he is believed to descend for all forms of life in the planet. The temple is revered in Nalayira Divya Prabandham, the 7th–9th century Vaishnava canon, by Thirumangai Alvar in one hymn. The temple is classified as a Divya Desam, one of the 108 Vishnu temples that are mentioned in the book.

== Gallery ==
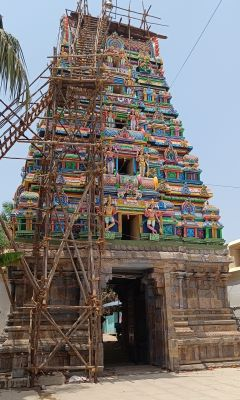
Rajagopura

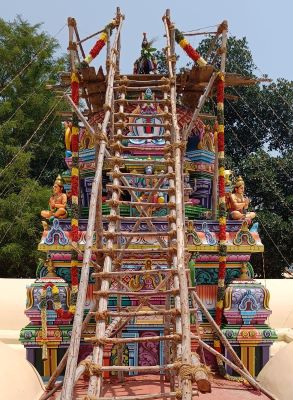
Vimana of the presiding deity

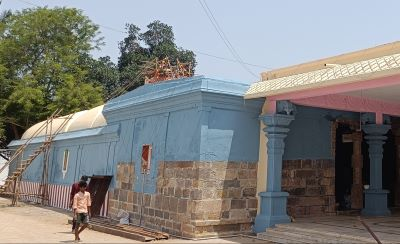
Right prakara

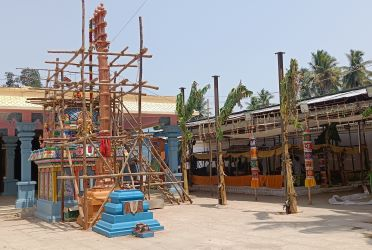
Left prakara

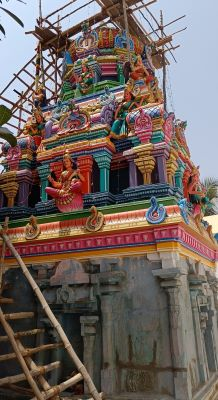
Shrine

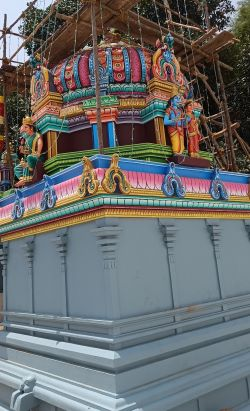
Shrine of Andal

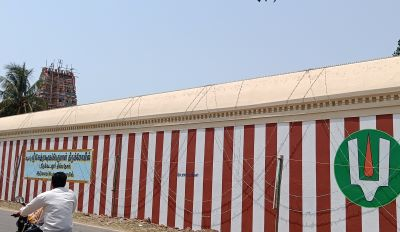
Outer wall of the temple
