= Aduthurai =

Aduthurai may refer to either of the two populated places in Kumbakonam, Tamil Nadu - one on the north or one on the south

- Vadakurangaduthurai
- Maruthuvakudi
