= Neduvasal, Thanjavur =

Village in the Thanjavur district of India

Neduvasal is a village in the Ammapettai revenue block, Papanasam taluk, Thanjavur district of Tamil Nadu state, India.

== Demographics ==
Neduvasal has the population of 1656. Of these 814 are males, while 842 are females. This village has a lower literacy rate of compared to that of the state. According to the 2011 census, Neduvasal has a literacy rate of 71.9%. This village population consists of about 35.87% of Scheduled castes.
