= Sathiyamangalam =

Sathiyamangalam may refer to:

- Sathyamangalam, a town and municipality in Erode district, Tamil Nadu
- Sathiyamangalam, Pudukkottai, a village in Pudukkottai district, Tamil Nadu, India
- Sathiyamangalam, Thanjavur, a village in Thanjavur district, Tamil Nadu, India
- Sathiyamangalam, Viluppuram, a village in Viluppuram district, Tamil Nadu, India
