= Sooliyakkottai =

Village

Sooliyakkottai is a village in the Ammapettai revenue block, Papanasam taluk, Thanjavur district of Tamil Nadu state, India.

== Demographics ==
Sooliyakkottai has the population of 2316. The male population is 1125 and female population is 1196. The literacy rate of the village is 72.53%.This is lower than that of the state Tamil Nadu which has a literacy rate of 80.09% according to 2011 Census.
