= Kothangudi, Papanasam taluk =

Kothangudi
- village
- Country: India
- State: Tamil Nadu
- District: Thanjavur
- Taluk: Papanasam

Population (2001)
  - Total: 791

Languages
  - Official: Tamil
- Time zone: UTC+5:30 (IST)

Kothangudi is a village in the Papanasam taluk of Thanjavur district, Tamil Nadu, India.

== Demographics ==
As per the 2001 census, Kothangudi had a total population of 791 with 394 males and 397 females. The sex ratio was 1008. The literacy rate was 56.71.
