= Bhavaniyambalpuram =

Coordinates: 10°47′N 79°11′E

- village
- Interactive map of Bhavaniyambalpuram
- Country: India
- State: Tamil Nadu
- District: Thanjavur

Population (2001)
  - Total: 811

Languages
  - Official: Tamil
- Time zone: UTC+5:30 (IST)

Bhavaniyambalpuram is a village in the Papanasam taluk of Thanjavur district, Tamil Nadu, India.

== Demographics ==
As per the 2001 census, Bhavaniyambalpuram had a total population of 811 with 393 males and 418 females. The sex ratio was 1064. The literacy rate was 82.26.
