= Maruthuvakkudi =

- village
- Country: India
- State: Tamil Nadu
- District: Thanjavur
- Taluk: Papanasam

Population (2001)
  - Total: 796

Languages
  - Official: Tamil
- Time zone: UTC+5:30 (IST)

Maruthuvakkudi is a village in the Papanasam taluk of Thanjavur district, Tamil Nadu, India.

== Demographics ==
As per the 2001 census, Maruthuvakkudi had a total population of 796 with 389 males and 407 females. The sex ratio was 1046. The literacy rate was 65.86.
