= Arulmolipet =

Arulmolipet Arulmozhipettai
- village
- Arun Mozhi Dheva Valanadu
- Country: India
- State: Tamil Nadu
- District: Thanjavur
- Region: Chola Nadu
- Zone: Cauvery Delta
- Founder: Raja Raja Cholan
- Named for: Arun Mozhi Varman

Population (2001)
  - Total: 854

Languages
  - Official: Tamil
- Time zone: UTC+5:30 (IST)
- Postal code: 613501

Arulmolipet or Arulmozhipettai is a village in the Alangudi Panchayat, Ammapettai Block, Papanasam taluk in Thanjavur district, Tamil Nadu, India.

== Demographics ==
As per the 2001 census, Arulmolipet had a total population of 854 with 420 males and 434 females. The sex ratio was 1033. The literacy rate was 71.25.
