= Palliyur =

Coordinates: 10°49′N 79°17′E

- village
- Interactive map of Palliyur
- Country: India
- State: Tamil Nadu
- District: Thanjavur
- Taluk: Papanasam

Population (2001)
  - Total: 2,000

Languages
  - Official: Tamil
- Time zone: UTC+5:30 (IST)

Palliyur is a village in the Papanasam taluk of Thanjavur district, Tamil Nadu, India.

== Demographics ==
As per the 2001 census, Palliyur had a total population of 2000 with 996 males and 1004 females. The sex ratio was 1008. The literacy rate was 66.02.
