= Serumakkanallur =

Coordinates: 10°53′N 79°13′E

- village
- Interactive map of Serumakkanallur
- Country: India
- State: Tamil Nadu
- District: Thanjavur
- Taluk: Papanasam

Population (2001)
  - Total: 2,163

Languages
  - Official: Tamil
- Time zone: UTC+5:30 (IST)

Serumakkanallur is a village in the Papanasam taluk of Thanjavur district, Tamil Nadu, India.

== Demographics ==
As per the 2001 census, Serumakkanallur had a total population of 2163 with 1058 males and 1105 females. The sex ratio was 1044. The literacy rate was 79.1.
