= Ombathuveli =

Onbathuveli
- village
- Interactive map of Onbathuveli
- Coordinates: 10°52′23″N 79°15′37″E
- Country: India
- State: Tamil Nadu
- District: Thanjavur
- Taluk: Papanasam

Population (2001)
  - Total: 1,738

Languages
  - Official: Tamil
- Time zone: UTC+5:30 (IST)
- PIN: 614302

Ombathuveli is a village in the Papanasam taluk of Thanjavur district, Tamil Nadu, India.

== Demographics ==
As per the 2001 census, Ombathuveli had a total population of 1738 with 866 males and 872 females. The sex ratio was 100.7%. The literacy rate was 74.25%.
