= Deepambalpuram =

Neighbourhood in Thanjavur district, Tamil Nadu, India

- Village
- Location in Tamil Nadu, India
- Coordinates: 10.8035°N 79.3269°E
- Country: India
- State: Tamil Nadu
- District: Thanjavur
- Elevation: 47.3 m (155 ft)

Population (2001)
  - Total: 670

Languages
  - Official: Tamil
- Time zone: UTC+5:30 (IST)

Deepambalpuram is a village in the Papanasam taluk of Thanjavur district, Tamil Nadu, India.

== Demographics ==
As per the 2001 census, Deepambalpuram had a total population of 670 with 322 males and 348 females. The sex ratio was 1081. The literacy rate was 64.58.

== Temple ==
There is a historical Sivan temple, where are the deities are Vanmeeganathar and Mangalambigai.

=== Idol theft ===
The idols of Shiva and Parvati called as Alingana Murti were stolen sometime in 1960s. The Idol Wing of the Tamil Nadu Criminal Investigation Department (IW-CID), with help from the volunteer-collective India Pride Project has traced them David Owsley Museum of Art at the Ball State University in the United States. The Idols were successfully recovered in 2021.
