= Kandhavanam =

- village
- Location in Tamil Nadu, India
- Coordinates: 10.80122°N 79.259211°E
- Country: India
- State: Tamil Nadu
- District: Thanjavur

Population (2001)
  - Total: 704

Languages
  - Official: Tamil
- Time zone: UTC+5:30 (IST)

Kandhavanam is a village in the Papanasam taluk of Thanjavur district, Tamil Nadu, India.

== Demographics ==
As per the 2001 census, Kandhavanam had a total population of 704 with 343 males and 361 females. The sex ratio was 1052. The literacy rate was 60.63.
