= Konthagai =

- Village
- Interactive map of Konthagai
- Coordinates: 9°50′39″N 78°11′03″E
- Country: India
- State: Tamil Nadu
- District: Thanjavur
- Taluk: Papanasam

Population (2026)
  - Total: 617

Languages
  - Official: Tamil
- Time zone: UTC+5:30 (IST)
- PIN: 612303

Konthagai is a rural village in Papanasam taluk of Thanjavur district in the Indian state of Tamil Nadu. The village is mostly a farming area and is connected by local roads to nearby towns, and residents typically depend on these towns for education, healthcare, and other services. The official postal PIN code of the village is 612303.

The geographical area of Konthagai is approximately 98.46 hectares, and farming is the primary job for the population.

== Demographics ==
Konthagai's current estimated population in 2026 is 617, including 301 males and 293 females. Showing a 7.14% increase from the 2011 Census.

In the 2011 Census of India, Konthagai had a population of 575, including 282 males and 293 females, living in 149 households.

In the 2001 Census of India, Konthagai had a population of 507, including 245 males and 262 females. The sex ratio was 1069 females per 1000 males, and the literacy rate was 64.8%.

== Konthagai Burial Site ==
The Konthagai burial site is located near the Keeladi archaeological region in Tamil Nadu and is associated with important archaeological discoveries related to ancient burial practices.

Excavations at the site uncovered over 137 burial urns with the remains of adults and children. People were buried in large urns placed in the ground, often with pottery, iron objects, and beads, and sometimes more than one person in a single urn. Other discoveries include a child's skeleton in an urn, graffiti-marked pottery, carnelian beads that suggest long-distance trade, and paddy grains used as offerings.
