= Umbalapadi =

- village
- Country: India
- State: Tamil Nadu
- District: Thanjavur
- Taluk: Papanasam

Population (2001)
  - Total: 4,530

Languages
  - Official: Tamil
- Time zone: UTC+5:30 (IST)

Umbalapadi is a village in the Papanasam taluk of Thanjavur district, Tamil Nadu, India.

== Demographics ==
As per the 2001 census, Umbalapadi had a total population of 4530 with 2291 males and 2231 females. The sex ratio was 970. The literacy rate was 73.69.
