= Annappanpettai =

- village
- Interactive map of Annappanpettai
- Coordinates: 10.8367622°N 79.1959816°E
- Country: India
- State: Tamil Nadu
- District: Thanjavur

Population (2001)
  - Total: 1,452

Languages
  - Official: Tamil
- Time zone: UTC+5:30 (IST)

Annappanpettai is a village in the Papanasam taluk of Thanjavur district, Tamil Nadu, India.

== Demographics ==
As per the 2001 census, Annappanpettai had a total population of 1452 with 770 males and 772 females. The sex ratio was 1017. The literacy rate was 61.96.
