= Govindanallucheri =

- village
- Country: India
- State: Tamil Nadu
- District: Thanjavur

Population (2001)
  - Total: 3,088

Languages
  - Official: Tamil
- Time zone: UTC+5:30 (IST)

Govindanallucheri is a village in the Papanasam taluk of Thanjavur district, Tamil Nadu, India.

== Demographics ==
As per the 2001 census, Govindanallucheri had a total population of 3088 with 1542 males and 1546 females. The sex ratio was 1003. The literacy rate was 65.64.
