= Athur Thottam =

Anna Thottam
- village
- Country: India
- State: Tamil Nadu
- District: Thanjavur

Population (2001)
  - Total: 184

Languages
  - Official: Tamil
- Time zone: UTC+5:30 (IST)
- Postal code: 613502

Anna Thottam is a village in the Papanasam taluk of Thanjavur district, Tamil Nadu, India.

== Demographics ==
As per the 2001 census, Athur Thottam had a total population of 184 with 90 males and 94 females. The sex ratio was 1044. The literacy rate was 62.18.
