= Dayanidheeswarar Temple =

Coordinates: 10.922049°N 79.196965°E

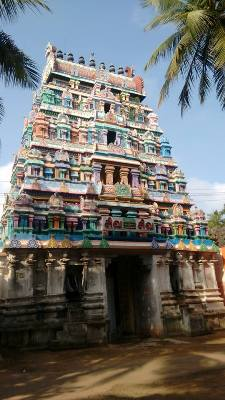
Rajagopuram

Sri Dayanidheeswarar Temple (ஸ்ரீ தயாநிதீஸ்வரர் கோயில்) is a Hindu temple located at Vadakurangaduthurai in the Thanjavur district of Tamil Nadu, India dedicated to the Hindu God Shiva.

== Significance and Legend ==
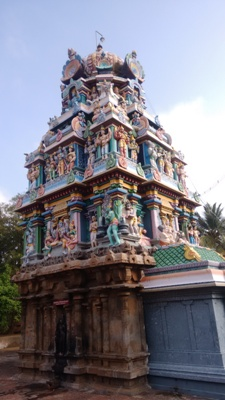
Vimana of the presiding deity

Sambandar has sung praises of the temple in his Thevaram. The temples is also associated with legends of the sage Arunagirinathar.This temple is also associated with Sri Ramayanam. When Lord Rama, Hanuman and his other ape companions were traveling south, they passed through this place at the banks of Kaveri River and served as a port. For a safe river crossing, Hanuman prayed to Lord Siva here and established the Dayanidhi Lingam. Thus the name of the village was derived as 'Vada Kurangu Kadu Thurai' meaning 'The port-forest of the northern monkey' in Tamil. This later came to be known as Vadakurangaduthurai. Pregnant women frequent the temple to pray for a safe delivery. The temple is counted as one of the temples built on the northern banks of River Kaveri.

== Shrines ==
There are idols of Nataraja, Sivagami, Ardhanaareeswarar, Kalabhairava, Surya, Nāga, Sanisvara, Lingam, Brahma, Murugan and Lakshmi within the precincts of the temple.

== Palace Devasthanam ==
Thanjavur Palace Devasthanam comprises 88 temples, of which this temple is the one. They are maintained and administered by the Hindu Religious and Charitable Endowments Department of the Government of Tamil Nadu.
