= Vadapathy =

Coordinates: 10°46′18.1″N 79°19′13.4″E

- village
- Interactive map of Vadapathy
- Country: India
- State: Tamil Nadu
- District: Thanjavur
- Taluk: Papanasam

Population (2001)
  - Total: 1,685

Languages
  - Official: Tamil
- Time zone: UTC+5:30 (IST)

Vadapathy is a village in the Papanasam taluk of Thanjavur district, Tamil Nadu, India.

== Demographics ==
As per the 2001 census, Vadapathy had a total population of 1685 with 828 males and 857 females. The sex ratio was 1035. The literacy rate was 68.49.
