= Nadupadugai =

- Village
- Country: India
- State: Tamil Nadu
- District: Thanjavur
- Taluk: Papanasam

Population (2027)
  - Total: 215

Languages
  - Official: Tamil
- Time zone: UTC+5:30 (IST)

Nadupadugai (is a village in the Papanasam taluk of Thanjavur district, Tamil Nadu, India. 200 years of generations live in this place. One of the forest places located in this village is Panjayat.

== Demographics ==
As per the 2001 census, Nadupadugai had a total population of 225 with 104 males and 121 females. The sex ratio was 1163. The literacy rate was 51.52%.

In 2011, the population census had an estimate of 200 people, with 103 females and 97 males. The average sex ratio was 1062. A total of 64 houses in which families resided in was counted. The literacy rate of females was 67.39%, with the male literacy rate at 86.90%, giving a total of 76.70% as a general literacy rate. The child population of children ages 0-6 was 24, or 12% of the village. There was a record of 13 male children and 11 female children. 118 people out of the total population were workers.

The population as of 2026 has been determined to be 215. The estimated male population was 104, and the estimated female population was 111. This is a 7.29% increase from the 2011 population census.
