= Karuppurpadugai =

- village
- Country: India
- State: Tamil Nadu
- District: Thanjavur

Population (2001)
  - Total: 511

Languages
  - Official: Tamil
- Time zone: UTC+5:30 (IST)

Karuppurpadugai is a village in the Papanasam taluk of Thanjavur district, Tamil Nadu, India.

== Demographics ==
As per the 2001 census, Karuppurpadugai had a total population of 511 with 244 males and 267 females. The literacy rate was 44.93.
