= Kambarnatham =

- village
- Location in Tamil Nadu, India
- Coordinates: 10.751355°N 79.294103°E
- Country: India
- State: Tamil Nadu
- District: Thanjavur

Population (2011)
  - Total: 2,536

Languages
  - Official: Tamil
- Time zone: UTC+5:30 (IST)

Κambarnatham is a village in Ammapettai revenue block, Papanasam taluk, Thanjavur district of Tamil Nadu. It is one of the 46 panchayat villages in that revenue block.

== Demographics ==
According to 2011 census report, the village has 620 households with the total population of 2536 persons of which 1249 are male and 1287 are female.

== Literacy rate ==
The literacy rate of the village is just 63%.1614 out of 2536 are literates here . The male literacy rate is 71% and the female literacy rate is 55%.
