= Utharamangalam =

- village
- Country: India
- State: Tamil Nadu
- District: Thanjavur
- Taluk: Papanasam

Population (2001)
  - Total: 639

Languages
  - Official: Tamil
- Time zone: UTC+5:30 (IST)

Utharamangalam is a village in the Papanasam taluk of Thanjavur district, Tamil Nadu, India.

== Demographics ==
As per the 2001 census, Utharamangalam had a total population of 639 with 301 males and 338 females. The sex ratio was 1123. The literacy rate was 55.64.
