= Thiruvaiyathukudi =

- village
- Country: India
- State: Tamil Nadu
- District: Thanjavur
- Taluk: Papanasam

Population (2001)
  - Total: 1,636

Languages
  - Official: Tamil
- Time zone: UTC+5:30 (IST)

Thiruvaiyathukudi is a village in the Papanasam taluk of Thanjavur district, Tamil Nadu, India.

== Demographics ==
As per the 2001 census Thiruvaiyathukudi had a total population of 1636 with 795 males and 841 females. The sex ratio was 1058. The literacy rate was 66.71.
