= Neithalur =

- village
- Country: India
- State: Tamil Nadu
- District: Thanjavur
- Taluk: Papanasam

Population (2001)
  - Total: 876

Languages
  - Official: Tamil
- Time zone: UTC+5:30 (IST)

Neithalur is a village in the Papanasam taluk of Thanjavur district, Tamil Nadu, India.

The total geographical area of village is 785.01 hectares.

== Demographics ==
As per the 2001 census, Neithalur had a total population of 876 with 457 males and 419 females. The sex ratio was 917. The literacy rate was 61.13.
