= Keelakoil Pathu =

- village
- Country: India
- State: Tamil Nadu
- District: Thanjavur

Population (2001)
  - Total: 2,596

Languages
  - Official: Tamil
- Time zone: UTC+5:30 (IST)

Keelakoil Pathu is a village in the Papanasam taluk of Thanjavur district, Tamil Nadu, India.

== Demographics ==
As per the 2001 census, Keelakoil Pathu had a total population of 2596 with 1290 males and 1306 females. The sex ratio was 1012. The literacy rate was 67.72.
