= Vadakurangaduthurai =

- Village
- Location in Tamil Nadu, India Vadakurangaduthurai (India)
- Coordinates: 10.9220°N 79.1971°E
- Country: India
- State: Tamil Nadu
- District: Thanjavur
- Taluk: Papanasam

Languages
  - Official: Tamil
- Time zone: UTC+5:30 (IST)

Vadakurangaduthurai is a village located in the Papanasam taluk on the north bank of the Kaveri river, Tamil Nadu, India. It is 4 km from the town of Papanasam and is also known as Aduthurai and Aaduthurai Perumal Koil.

== Etymology and Legend ==
It is believed that when Lord Rama was passing through south, he wanted to cross the Kaveri river. This place was earlier a port on the Kaveri river. In order to attain a safe river crossing, Hanuman worshipped a Shivalinga here, which he named as Dayanidheeswarar. Thus, the port got the name 'Vada Kurangu Kadu Thurai' meaning 'The forest-port of the northern monkey' in Tamil which later came to be known as Vadakurankaduthurai. The temple is still located in the village and is an important pilgrimage site.

== Temples ==
- Sri Dayanidheeswarar Shiva Temple - one of 275 Padal Petra Sthalams.
- Aduthurai Perumal Temple - one of the 108 Divya Desams

== Schools ==
- Srividyasram Matriculation School
