= Raramuthirakkottai =

- village
- Country: India
- State: Tamil Nadu
- District: Thanjavur
- Taluk: Papanasam

Population (2001)
  - Total: 2,803

Languages
  - Official: Tamil
- Time zone: UTC+5:30 (IST)

Raramuthirakkottai is a village in the Papanasam taluk of Thanjavur district, Tamil Nadu, India.

== Demographics ==
As per the 2001 census, Raramuthirakkottai had a total population of 2803 with 1392 males and 1411 females. The sex ratio was 1014. The literacy rate was 70.55.
