= Pulavarnatham =

- village
- Country: India
- State: Tamil Nadu
- District: Thanjavur
- Taluk: Papanasam

Population (2001)
  - Total: 1,877

Languages
  - Official: Tamil
- Time zone: UTC+5:30 (IST)

Pulavarnatham is a village in the Papanasam taluk of Thanjavur district, Tamil Nadu, India.

== Demographics ==
As per the 2001 census, Pulavarnatham had a total population of 1877 with 917 males and 960 females. The sex ratio was 1047. The literacy rate was 68.15.
