= Nallavanniyankudikadu =

- village
- Country: India
- State: Tamil Nadu
- District: Thanjavur
- Taluk: Papanasam

Population (2001)
  - Total: 2,399

Languages
  - Official: Tamil
- Time zone: UTC+5:30 (IST)

Nallavanniyankudikadu is a village in the Papanasam taluk of Thanjavur district, Tamil Nadu, India.

== Demographics ==
As per the 2001 census, Nallavanniyankudikadu had a total population of 2399 with 1207 males and 1192 females. The sex ratio was 988. The literacy rate was 79.51.
