= Kumilakudi =

- village
- Country: India
- State: Tamil Nadu
- District: Thanjavur
- Taluk: Papanasam

Government
  - Type: Gram Panchayat
  - Panchayat President: Ashok Kumar

Population (2001)
  - Total: 1,136

Languages
  - Official: Tamil
- Time zone: UTC+5:30 (IST)

Kumilakudi is a village in the Papanasam taluk of Thanjavur district, Tamil Nadu, India.

== Demographics ==
As per the 2001 census, Kothangudi had a total population of 1136 with 567 males and 569 females. The sex ratio was 1004. The literacy rate was 76.21.
