= Kathirinatham =

- village
- Country: India
- State: Tamil Nadu
- District: Thanjavur

Population (2001)
  - Total: 909

Languages
  - Official: Tamil
- Time zone: UTC+5:30 (IST)

Kathirinatham is a village in the Papanasam taluk of Thanjavur district, Tamil Nadu, India.

== Demographics ==
As per the 2001 census, Kathirinatham had a total population of 909 with 440 males and 469 females. The sex ratio was 1066. The literacy rate was 54.9.
