= Arundavapuram =

Village in Tamil Nadu, India

Coordinates: 10°45′N 79°19′E

Arundavapuram is a large village located in Ammapettai block, Papanasam Taluk, Thanjavur District, India.

== Demographics ==
Arundavapuram had a total of 651 houses, and a population of 2,603 according to the 2011 census of India. The literacy rate was 73.01% compared to 80.09% for Tamil Nadu.

== Nearest places ==
Arundavapuram is located 22.2km away from district capital Thanjavur;5.2km away from revenue block capital Ammapettai;7km from Saliyamangalam;9.1km from Needamangalam

== Nearest airport ==
Thanjavur Air Force Station is the nearest airport to Arundavapuram. It is 24.8 km from Arundavapuram, but the main airport is the Karaikal Airport 58.4 km distance away.

== Nearest beaches ==
Nagapattinam beach is the nearest beach, 56.7|km away from Arundavapuram. The other beaches nearby are Velankanni beach – 57.5 kilometres (35.7 mi) and Karaikal beach – 60 kilometres (37 mi).
