= Neikunnam =

- village
- Country: India
- State: Tamil Nadu
- District: Thanjavur
- Taluk: Papanasam

Population (2001)
  - Total: 1,311

Languages
  - Official: Tamil
- Time zone: UTC+5:30 (IST)

Neikunnam is a village in the Papanasam taluk of Thanjavur district, Tamil Nadu, India.

== Demographics ==
As per the 2001 census, Neikunnam had a total population of 1311 with 654 males and 667 females. The sex ratio was 1005. The literacy rate was 63.09.
