= Ponmeindanallur =

Ponmanmeindanallur
- village
- Country: India
- State: Tamil Nadu
- District: Thanjavur
- Taluk: Papanasam

Population (2001)
  - Total: 619

Languages
  - Official: Tamil
- Time zone: UTC+5:30 (IST)

Ponmeindanallur is a village in the Papanasam taluk of Thanjavur district, Tamil Nadu, India.

== Demographics ==
As per the 2001 census, Ponmeindanallur had a total population of 619 with 304 males and 315 females. The sex ratio was 1036. The literacy rate was 51.39.
