= Pulimangalam =

Coordinates: 13°04′N 79°23′E

- village
- Interactive map of Pulimangalam
- Country: India
- State: Tamil Nadu
- District: Thanjavur
- Taluk: Papanasam

Population (2001)
  - Total: 720

Languages
  - Official: Tamil
- Time zone: UTC+5:30 (IST)

Pulimangalam is a village in the Papanasam taluk of Thanjavur district, Tamil Nadu, India.

== Demographics ==
As per the 2001 census, Pulimangalam had a total population of 720 with 355 males and 365 females. The sex ratio was 1028. The literacy rate was 75.82.
