= Soraikkaiyur =

- Village
- Country: India
- State: Tamil Nadu
- District: Thanjavur
- Taluk: Papanasam

Population (2001)
  - Total: 739

Languages
  - Official: Tamil
- Time zone: UTC+5:30 (IST)

Soraikkaiyur is a village in the Papanasam taluk of Thanjavur district, Tamil Nadu, India.

== Demographics ==
At the 2001 census, Soraikkaiyur had a population of 739 (396 males and 343 females). The sex ratio was 866, and the literacy rate was 65.16%.
