= Ullikkadai =

Coordinates: 10°55′N 79°13′E

- village
- Interactive map of Ullikkadai
- Country: India
- State: Tamil Nadu
- District: Thanjavur
- Taluk: Papanasam

Population (2001)
  - Total: 2,962

Languages
  - Official: Tamil
- Time zone: UTC+5:30 (IST)

Ullikkadai is a village in the Papanasam taluk of Thanjavur district, Tamil Nadu, India.

== Demographics ==
As per the 2001 census, Ullikkadai had a total population of 2962 with 1474 males and 1488 females. The sex ratio was 1009. The literacy rate was 72.9.
