= Irumbuthalai =

Irumbuthalai is a village in Ammapettai block of Thanjavur district, Tamil Nadu, India. This village is known throughout the area for its Ayyanar Temple.
