= Viluthiyur =

- village
- Country: India
- State: Tamil Nadu
- District: Thanjavur
- Taluk: Papanasam

Population (2001)
  - Total: 950

Languages
  - Official: Tamil
- Time zone: UTC+5:30 (IST)

Viluthiyur is a village in the Papanasam taluk of Thanjavur district, Tamil Nadu, India.

== Demographics ==
As per the 2001 census, Viluthiyur had a total population of 950 with 481 males and 469 females. The sex ratio was 975. The literacy rate was 71.36.
