= Edakkudi =

- village
- Country: India
- State: Tamil Nadu
- District: Thanjavur

Population (2001)
  - Total: 862

Languages
  - Official: Tamil
- Time zone: UTC+5:30 (IST)

Edakkudi is a village in the Papanasam taluk of Thanjavur district, Tamil Nadu, India.

== Demographics ==
As per the 2001 census, Edakkudi had a total population of 862 with 437 males and 425 females. The sex ratio was 973. The literacy rate was 62.33.
