= Porakkudi =

- village
- Country: India
- State: Tamil Nadu
- District: Thanjavur
- Taluk: Papanasam

Population (2001)
  - Total: 906

Languages
  - Official: Tamil
- Time zone: UTC+5:30 (IST)

Porakkudi is a village in the Papanasam taluk of Thanjavur district, Tamil Nadu, India.

== Demographics ==
As per the 2001 census, Porakkudi had a total population of 906 with 455 males and 451 females. The sex ratio was 991. The literacy rate was 64.19.
