= Dalavaipalayam =

Neighbourhood in Thanjavur district, Tamil Nadu, India

- Village
- Dalavaipalayam, Thanjavur district, Tamil Nadu
- Coordinates: 10.7685°N 79.1781°E
- Country: India
- State: Tamil Nadu
- District: Thanjavur
- Elevation: 72.91 m (239.2 ft)

Population (2001)
  - Total: 981

Languages
  - Official: Tamil
- Time zone: UTC+5:30 (IST)

Dalavaipalayam is a village in the Papanasam taluk of Thanjavur district, Tamil Nadu, India.

== Demographics ==
As per the 2001 census, Dalavaipalayam had a total population of 981 with 477 males and 504 females. The sex ratio was 1057. The literacy rate was 66.39.
