= Perumakkanallur =

Coordinates: 10°52′N 79°12′E

- village
- Interactive map of Perumakkanallur
- Country: India
- State: Tamil Nadu
- District: Thanjavur
- Taluk: Papanasam

Population (2001)
  - Total: 621

Languages
  - Official: Tamil
- Time zone: UTC+5:30 (IST)

Perumakkanallur is a village in the Papanasam taluk of Thanjavur district, Tamil Nadu, India.

== Demographics ==
As per the 2001 census, Perumakkanallur had a total population of 621 with 304 males and 317 females. The sex ratio was 1043. The literacy rate was 48.26.
