= Melasemmangudi =

- village
- Country: India
- State: Tamil Nadu
- District: Thanjavur
- Taluk: Papanasam

Population (2001)
  - Total: 914

Languages
  - Official: Tamil
- Time zone: UTC+5:30 (IST)

Melasemmangudi is a village in the Papanasam taluk of Thanjavur district, Tamil Nadu, India.

== Demographics ==
As per the 2001 census, Melasemmangudi had a total population of 914 with 461 males and 453 females. The sex ratio was 983. The literacy rate was 59.34.
