= Melakalakudi =

- village
- Country: India
- State: Tamil Nadu
- District: Thanjavur
- Taluk: Papanasam

Population (2001)
  - Total: 876

Languages
  - Official: Tamil
- Time zone: UTC+5:30 (IST)

Melakalakudi is a village in the Papanasam taluk of Thanjavur district, Tamil Nadu, India.

== Demographics ==
As per the 2001 census, Melakalakudi had a total population of 876 with 452 males and 424 females. The sex ratio was .938. The literacy rate was 61.7.
