= Kalancheri =

- village
- Country: India
- State: Tamil Nadu
- District: Thanjavur

Population (2001)
  - Total: 1,006

Languages
  - Official: Tamil
- Time zone: UTC+5:30 (IST)

Kalancheri is a village in the Papanasam taluk of Thanjavur district, Tamil Nadu, India. According to the Census of India conducted on 1 March 2001, the village had a population of 1,006 persons. Of whom 477 were males and 529 were females, giving a sex ratio of about 1,109 females per 1,000 males.. The literacy rate in the village was 74.05 percent, showing higher male literacy compared to female literacy.

== Demographics ==
As per the 2001 census, Kalancheri had a total population of 1006 with 477 males and 529 females. The sex ratio was 110.9. The literacy rate was 74.05.
