= Saliamangalam =

Coordinates: 10°47′N 79°16′E

Saliyamangalam Achyuthapuram
- village
- Interactive map of Saliyamangalam
- Country: India
- State: Tamil Nadu
- District: Thanjavur
- Taluk: Papanasam

Government
  - Panchayat President: Sakthi Sivakumar

Population (2001)
  - Total: 4,657

Languages
  - Official: Tamil
- Time zone: UTC+5:30 (IST)
- Postal code: 613504
- Vehicle registration: TN 68

Saliyamangalam is a village in the Papanasam taluk of Thanjavur district, Tamil Nadu, India. It is one of the two places in Tamil Nadu where the Bhagavathar Melas are held, the other being Melattur.

== Location ==
Saliyamangalam in Thanjavur was originally established as Achyuthapuram in late 16th century by the Cholas. Bhagavatha Melas is a yearly folk drama depicting the destruction of Hiranyakashipu by Lord Narasima peruman. The Prahalada Charitram dance drama is being held there since 1645 without break. Saliyamangalam is located in the Ammapet block of Thanjavur district. One of the major temples in Saliyamangalam is Abhaya Karpaga Vinayakar and Shankara Vishnu Durga Temple in Agraharam. It is situated 15 kilometres from the town of Thanjavur.

Saliyamangalam is a Village in Ammapettai Block in Thanjavur District of Tamil Nadu State, India. It is located 17 KM towards East from District head quarters Thanjavur. 3 KM from Ammapettai. 320 KM from State capital Chennai

Saliyamangalam Pin code is 613504 and postal head office is Saliamangalam .

Poondi (2 KM), Palliyur (3 KM), Kalancheri (3 KM), Kambarnatham (4 KM), Kumilakudi (4 KM) are the nearby Villages to Saliyamangalam. Saliyamangalam is surrounded by Valangaiman Block towards East, Nidamangalam Block towards East, Thanjavur Block towards west, Nanjikottai Block towards west .

Thanjavur, Nanjikottai, Thiruvarur, Pattukkottai are the near by Cities to Saliyamangalam.

This Place is in the border of the Thanjavur District and Thiruvarur District. Thiruvarur District Nidamangalam is East towards this place .
