= Vilwaneswarar Temple =

Hindu temple in Thiruvaikavur, Tamil Nadu, India

Tiruvaikavur Temple
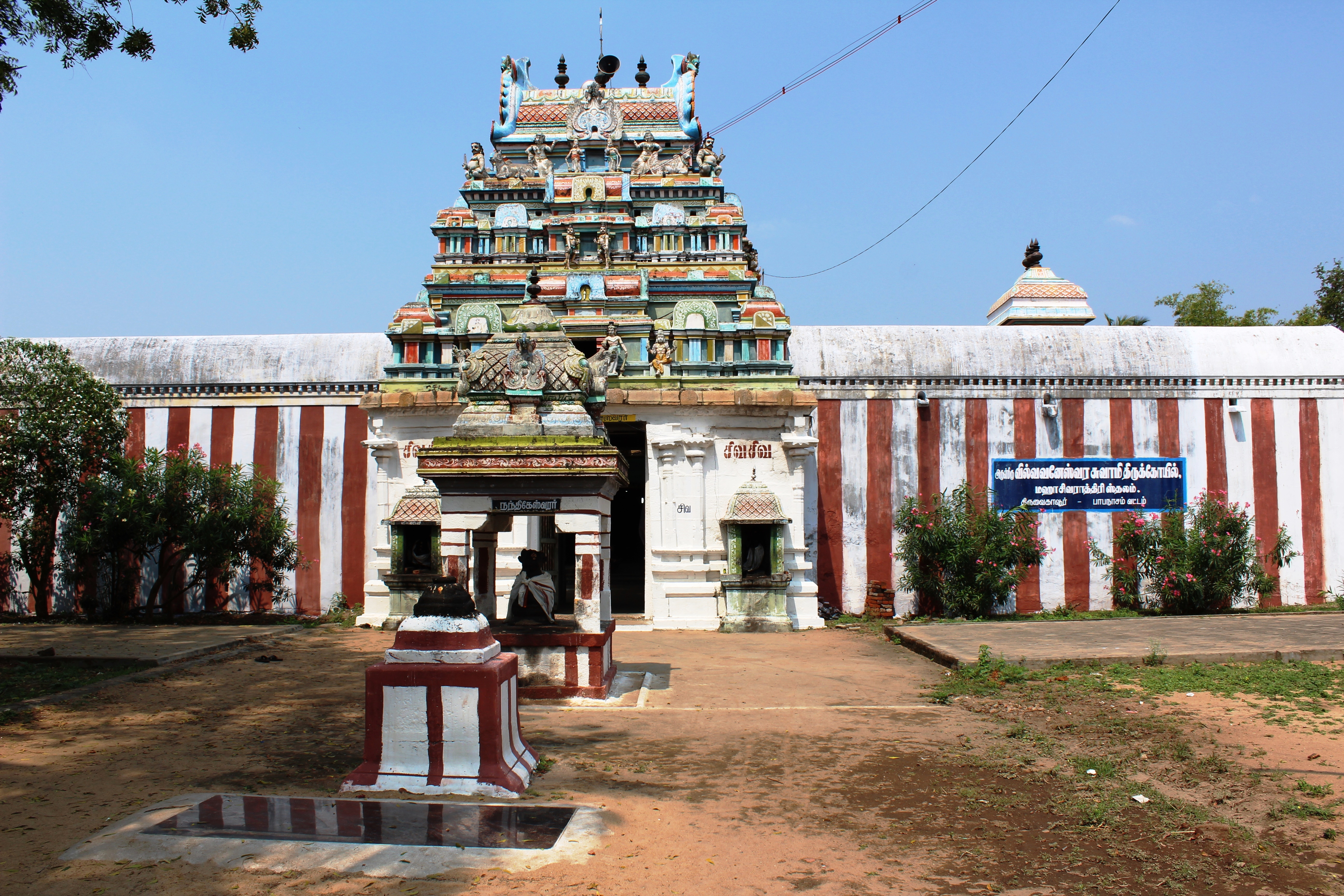

- Location in Tamil Nadu

Religion
- Affiliation: Hinduism
- District: Thanjavur
- Deity: Vilvavaneswarar / Vaikaavappar (Shiva); Valaikkai Nayaki / Sarvajana Rakshaki (Parvati)
- Features: Temple tank: Yama Theertham

Location
- Location: Tiruvaigavur
- State: Tamil Nadu
- Country: India
- Coordinates: 10.9942°N 79.2864°E

Architecture
- Type: Dravidian architecture
- Elevation: 51.89 m (170 ft)

Vilwavaneswarar Temple (also called Tiruvaikavur Temple or Thiruvaikavur Temple) is a Hindu temple dedicated to Shiva in Thiruvaikavur, Tamil Nadu, India. The temple is located 8 km (5.0 mi) north of Kumbakonam, on the southern bank of Kollidam. Constructed in the Dravidian style of architecture, the temple is believed to have been built during the Cholas period in the 7th century. Shiva is worshipped as Vilwaneswarar and his consort Parvati as Valaikai Nayagi.

The presiding deity is mentioned in the 7th century Tamil Saiva canonical work, the Tevaram, written by Tamil saint poets known as the Nayanmars and classified as Paadal Petra Sthalam. A granite wall surrounds the temple, enclosing all its shrines. The temple has a five-tiered Rajagopuram, the gateway tower.

== Legend ==
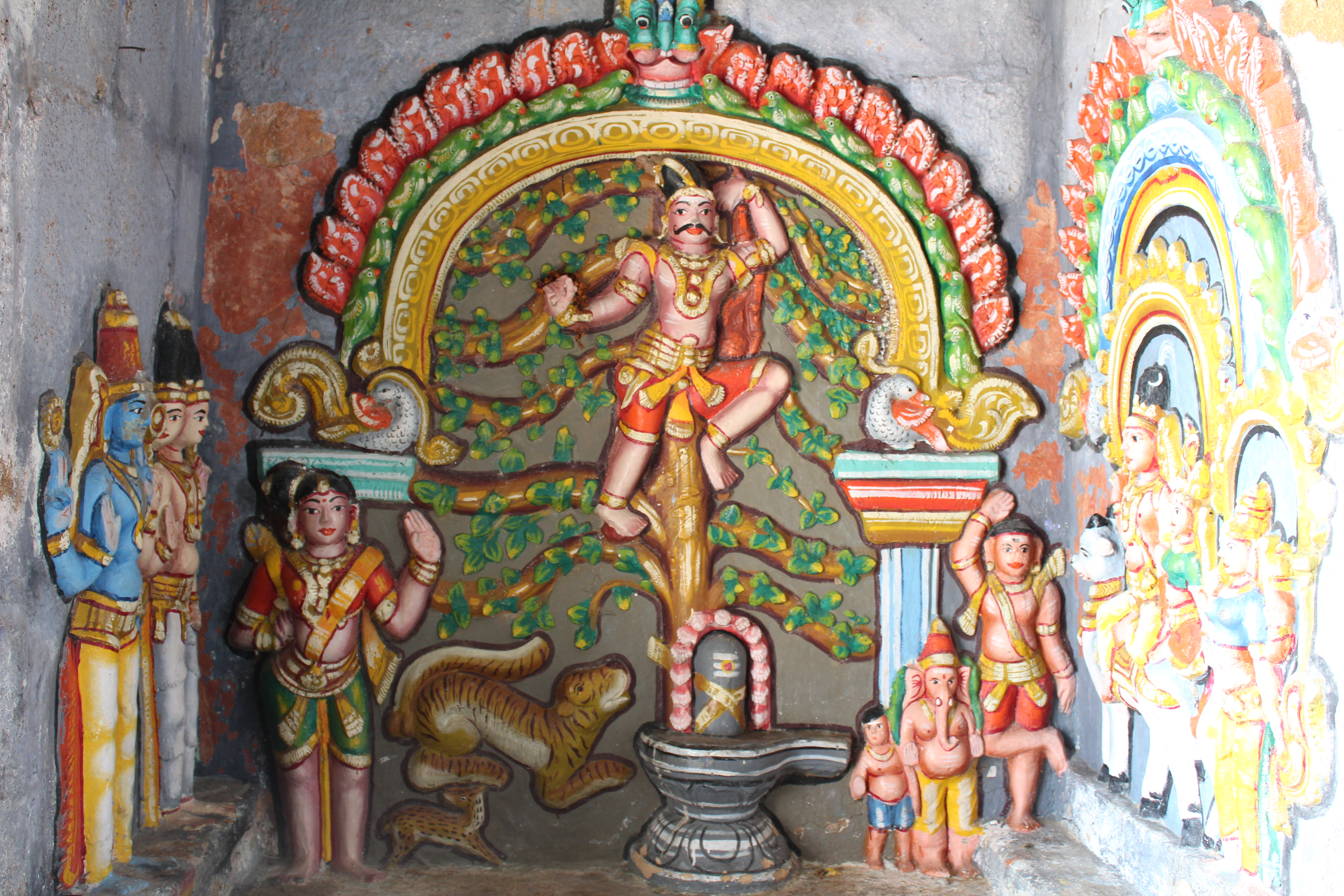
Legend of the temple

A saint named Thavanithi was performing his worship in the temple. A deer chased by a hunter held the aegis of the saint. The saint took the form of a tiger to frighten the hunter. The hunter out of fear climbed the Vilva tree in the temple, waiting for the tiger to relent. The tiger was relentless and the hunter in an effort to keep him awake all night spilled vilva leaves one by one the whole night. Incidentally the vilva leaves fell on a Shiva Lingam, under the tree. Since the day was Maha Shivaratri, the hunter got the blessings of Shiva as a result. The next day was to be the last day of the hunter. Yama, the death god approached the hunter to take away his soul. Dakshinamurthy (Guru) with his trishula (trident) and Nandi were driving Yama out of the temple. Shiva was unhappy about Nandi and just to avoid Shiva's wrath Nandi faces the temple entrance. It is also believed that Vishnu performed his penance here to overcome the curse of a chaste woman - the Shiva here is called Ariyeesar hence. Brahma and Agni held theertham here to worship Shiva here. The attributes of both Brahma and Agni was enhanced as a result. Saptamartrikas worshipped Shiva here by having a holy dip in Yama theertham, the temple tank here to regain the Ashtamasiddhi (powers) lost on account of a curse from the sage Uttala. Shiva and Parvati appeared here in the northern banks of Cauvery and Bhuma Devi is believed to have worshiped Shiva and the place is called Bhooomipuram hence. Shiva rescued the life of a child who was killed by a thief for his jewels on a Shivaratri and attained the name Makavaruleeswarar.

During the great deluge, the land was supposed to be destroyed and the world worshipped Shiva, who rose in the form of Vilva tree to save the land. The presiding deity obtained the name Vilvavanehswarar hence. The temple is counted as one of the temples built on the northern banks of River Kaveri.

== Architecture ==
There are two images of Chandikeswarar opposite the shrine of Durga. The stucco image of the legend is sculpted in the entrance. There are images of other deities including Vishnu, Narayani, Bhairava, Surya, Chandra and Shani in the second precinct. The temple is mentioned in the verses of Tirugnana Sambandar.

== Religious significance ==
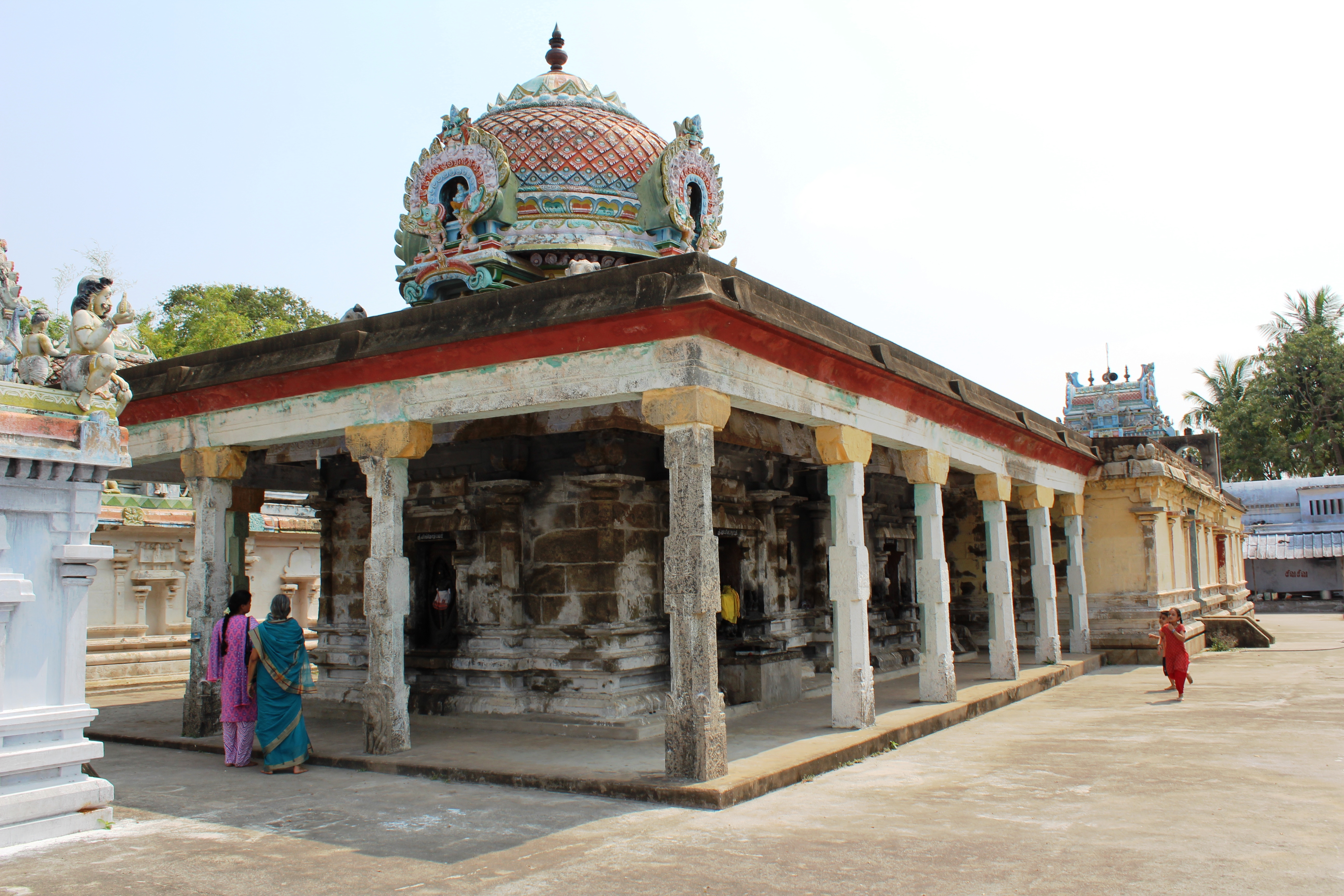
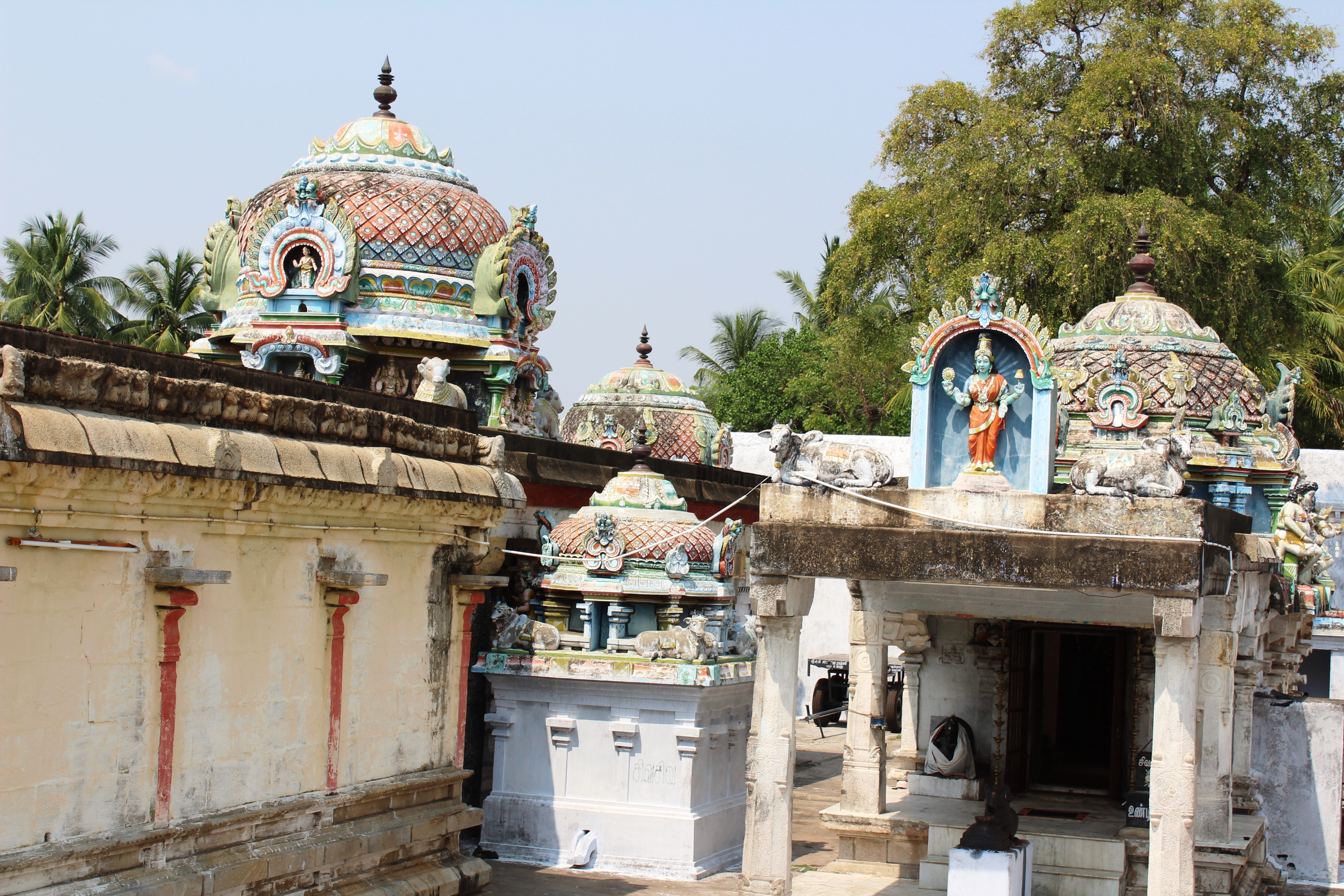
Sculptures and temple tank

The temple finds mention in Tevaram, the 7th century 12 volume Saiva canonical work by Tamil saints, namely Appar, Sundarar and Campantar. It is one of the shrines of the 275 Paadal Petra Sthalams in the Saiva canon.
