= Arumalai kottai =

Arumalai Kottai
- village
- Country: India
- State: Tamil Nadu
- District: Thanjavur

Languages
  - Official: Tamil
- Time zone: UTC+5:30 (IST)

Arumalai kottai is a large village in Thanjuvur, Tamil Nadu, India. The Original Name of the Village is "Arulmozhi varman Kottai". Arulmozhi varman is the name of King Raja cholan. This village belongs to one of the Vazhanadu in his ruling called "Kundavai Vazhanadu"; Kundavai is the name of his Sister "Kundavai Piratti". Over period of time the village name become Arumalai kottai and the nadu name become "Kulanthai VazhaNadu". Mostly, "kallar" people living in this village.
