= Vembukudi, Thanjavur =

Vembukudi
- village
- Interactive map of Vembukudi
- Coordinates: 10°52′21″N 79°12′28″E
- Country: India
- State: Tamil Nadu
- District: Thanjavur
- Taluk: Papanasam

Population (2001)
  - Total: 1,090

Languages
  - Official: Tamil
- Time zone: UTC+5:30 (IST)

Vembukudi is a village in the Papanasam taluk of Thanjavur district, Tamil Nadu, India.

== Demographics ==
As per the 2001 census, Vembukudi had a total population of 1090 with 555 males and 535 females. The sex ratio was 964. The literacy rate was 39.41.
