= Jambugapuram =

Coordinates: 10°44′N 79°14′E

- village
- Interactive map of Jambugapuram
- Country: India
- State: Tamil Nadu
- District: Thanjavur

Population (2001)
  - Total: 1,911

Languages
  - Official: Tamil
- Time zone: UTC+5:30 (IST)

Jambugapuram is a village in the Papanasam taluk of Thanjavur district, Tamil Nadu, India.

== Demographics ==
At the 2001 census, Jambugapuram had a total population of 1911 with 978 males and 933 females. The sex ratio was 954. The literacy rate was 59.98.
