= Umayalpuram =

Coordinates: 10.9534°N 79.2784°E

- village
- Interactive map of Umayalpuram
- Country: India
- State: Tamil Nadu
- District: Thanjavur
- Taluk: Papanasam

Population (2001)
  - Total: 4,697

Languages
  - Official: Tamil
- Time zone: UTC+5:30 (IST)

Umayalpuram is a village in the Papanasam taluk of Thanjavur district in the Indian state of Tamil Nadu.

== Demographics ==
As per the 2001 census, Umayalpuram had a population of 4697, including 2383 males and 2314 females for a sex ratio of 971. The literacy rate was 76.72.

== Geography ==
This village is on the Kumbakonam to Thiruvaiyaru route. It is 12 km from Kumbakonam. It is located near the Cauvery river. Umayalpuram is a plain in the Cauvery delta. Several endemic birds are found there. Peafowls, Ashy Prinia, Tawny flanked prinia, red-vented Bulbul, white browed Bulbul, oriental Magpie Robin, Bushchat, munia, mynah etc., are found there.

== Economy ==
The major crops are rice, sugar cane, cotton, and banana.

== Education ==
The village hosts a high school, which is more than 120 years old, Bharathy nursery and primary school, and a Government primary school.

== Notables ==
- Sri Umayalpuram K. Sivaraman, a mridangam player, was born in the village.
- Sri Sridhar Vembu, founder of ZOHO Corporation, a software company, was also born in this village.
