= Illuppakkorai =

- village
- Country: India
- State: Tamil Nadu
- District: Thanjavur

Population (2001)
  - Total: 1,526

Languages
  - Official: Tamil
- Time zone: UTC+5:30 (IST)

Illuppakkorai is a village in the Papanasam taluk of Thanjavur district, Tamil Nadu, India.

== Demographics ==
As per the 2001 census, Illuppakkorai had a total population of 1526 with 748 males and 778 females. The sex ratio was 1040. The literacy rate was 65.56.

ethnicity : East Indian, knowledge of languages : Tamil, Employment status : Agriculture. Village seems to have been founded by a small group of nomadic Agricultural families who tend to cultivate on wetlands.

Village was named after a variety of tree (illupai) + variety of grass (Korai) [marsh Reed] which were in abundance when it was first found. Most of these have been swept down for farming.

Village is in Delta region of River Cauvery & Kudamurutti. During rainy and winter season rivers used to flow in full and hence the contained alluvial (mostly fine sand) soil deposits of the village ooze in water, while summers are relatively dry.

Crops range from paddy, plantain, coconut, sugarcane, betel-nuts, betel-nut leaves and crops that survive on rich water supply. Village's economically is dependent agriculture, & hence source to water & River Cauvery play a vital role in its existence.

Notable peoples

Jayaranjan
