= Manalur, Thanjavur =

Coordinates: 12°01′N 78°56′E

Manalur
- village
- Interactive map of Manalur
- Country: India
- State: Tamil Nadu
- District: Thanjavur
- Taluk: Papanasam

Languages
  - Official: Tamil
- Time zone: UTC+5:30 (IST)

Manalur is a panchayat village in the Papanasam taluk of Thanjavur district, Tamil Nadu, India.

== Demographics ==
Manalur had not been demarcated as of the 2001 census.
