= Melakabisthalam =

- village
- Country: India
- State: Tamil Nadu
- District: Thanjavur
- Taluk: Papanasam

Population (2001)
  - Total: 1,940

Languages
  - Official: Tamil
- Time zone: UTC+5:30 (IST)

Melakabisthalam is a village in the Papanasam taluk of Thanjavur district, Tamil Nadu, India.

== Demographics ==
As per the 2001 census, Melakabisthalam had a total population of 1940 with 952 males and 988 females. The literacy rate was 79.77.
