= Chakkarapalli =

Neighbourhood in Thanjavur district, Tamil Nadu, India

- Village
- Chakkarapalli, Thanjavur district, Tamil Nadu
- Coordinates: 10.9010°N 79.2016°E
- Country: India
- State: Tamil Nadu
- District: Thanjavur

Population (2001)
  - Total: 6,082

Languages
  - Official: Tamil
- Time zone: UTC+5:30 (IST)
- PIN: 614211
- Vehicle registration: TN 49 TN 68

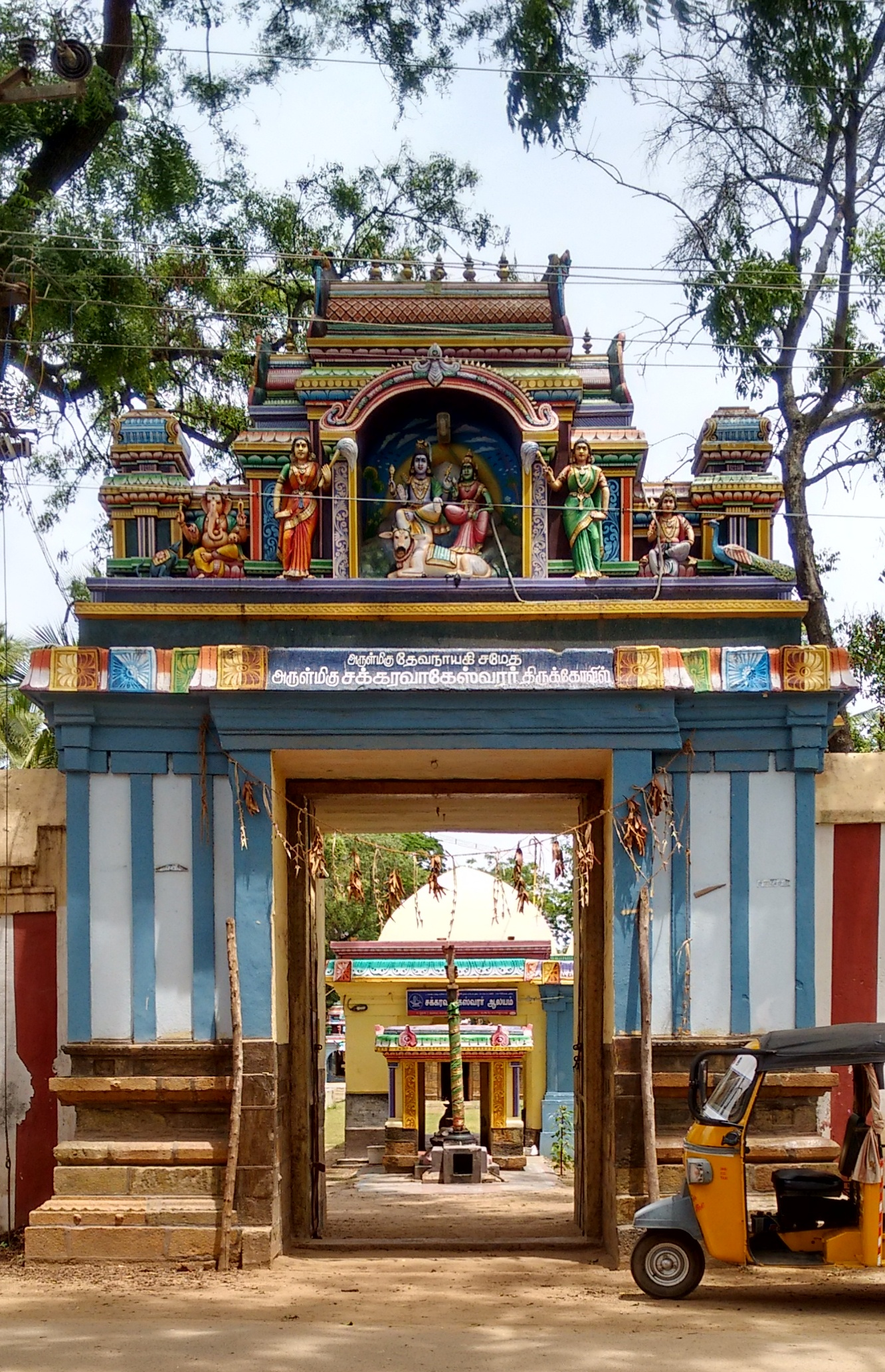
Chakkaravageswarar Temple, Chakkarapalli

Chakkarapalli is a village in the Papanasam taluk of Thanjavur district, Tamil Nadu, India. It is located in between Thanjavur - Kumbakonam highway. A more than thousand years old village having proof of Chakkaravageswarar Temple.

== Demographics ==
As per the 2001 census, Chakkarapalli had a total population of 6082 with 2856 males and 3226 females. The sex ratio was 1130. The literacy rate was 84.53.

== Police Station ==
chakkarapalli is under the control of Ayyampettai police station located near pasupathikovil

== Transport ==
=== Bus Stand ===
The nearest bus stand is ayyampettai Bus stand is located near by the Government Higher secondary school Ayyampettai. Ayyampettai is well connected with roads between the Highway of Thanjavur - Kumbakonam. All sorts of Buses provide service here.

=== Railway Station ===
The nearest railway station is Ayyampettai railway station is located towards Aharamangudi Road near from Railady mosque.

== Education ==
- Chakkarapalli Panchayat Government Secondary School, North Street.
- Chakkarapalli Panchayat Government School, Big Street.
