= Koonancheri =

Village in Tamil Nadu, India

- village
- Interactive map of Koonancheri
- Coordinates: 10°57′52″N 79°17′57″E
- Country: India
- State: Tamil Nadu
- District: Thanjavur
- Taluk: Papanasam

Population (2001)
  - Total: 1,341

Languages
  - Official: Tamil
- Time zone: UTC+5:30 (IST)
- PIN: 612301

Koonancheri is a village in the Papanasam taluk of Thanjavur district, Tamil Nadu, India.

== Demographics ==
At the 2001 census, Koonancheri had a total population of 1341 with 654 males and 687 females. The sex ratio was 1080. The literacy rate was 78.66.
