= Veeramangudi =

- village
- Country: India
- State: Tamil Nadu
- District: Thanjavur
- Taluk: Papanasam

Population (2001)
  - Total: 3,025

Languages
  - Official: Tamil
- Time zone: UTC+5:30 (IST)

Veeramangudi is a village in the Papanasam taluk of Thanjavur district, Tamil Nadu, India.

== Demographics ==
As per the 2001 census, Veeramangudi had a total population of 3025 with 1547 males and 1478 females. The sex ratio was 955. The literacy rate was 63.56.
