= Thurumbur =

- village
- Nickname: Thirumbur
- Country: India
- State: Tamil Nadu
- District: Thanjavur
- Taluk: Papanasam

Population (2001)
  - Total: 2,420

Languages
  - Official: Tamil
- Time zone: UTC+5:30 (IST)

Thurumbur is a village in the Papanasam taluk of Thanjavur district, Tamil Nadu, India. It is approximately 15 km (9.3 mi) from Papanasam and from Kumbakonam. Its temples are Sri sarva sakthi mariyamman temple, Ponniyamman temple, Ayyanaar temple, vinayagar temple, perumaal temple. It is bounded by manniyaaru in the north, Konkan in the south. In the east and west there is no notable physical boundary. It is bounded by the villages like thaavarangudi in the west, paathirimedu in the east, maanjeri in north and adhanoor in the south. This village has a fertile plain region where paddy, sugarcane, onion, cotton, black gram and vegetables were grown. Thiruvaikavur, which is famous for sivanraathri is just 4 km (2.5 mi) away from here whereas Swamimalai, which is famous for Murugan temple is 5 km (3.1 mi) away.

== Demographics ==
As per the 2001 census, Thurumbur had a total population of 2420 with 1214 males and 1206 females. The sex ratio was 993. The literacy rate was 65.12.
