= Gopurajapuram =

Coordinates: 10°51′N 79°48′E

- village
- Interactive map of Gopurajapuram
- Country: India
- State: Tamil Nadu
- District: Thanjavur

Population (2001)
  - Total: 2,125

Languages
  - Official: Tamil
- Time zone: UTC+5:30 (IST)
- Postal code: 614205

Gopurajapuram is a village in the Papanasam taluk of Thanjavur district, Tamil Nadu, India.

== Demographics ==
As per the 2001 census, Gopurajapuram had a total population of 2125 with 1057 males and 1068 females. The sex ratio was 1010. The literacy rate was 73.34.
