= Ragunathapuram =

- village
- Interactive map of Ragunathapuram
- Coordinates: 10°54′33″N 79°12′50″E
- Country: India
- State: Tamil Nadu
- District: Thanjavur
- Taluk: Papanasam

Population (2001)
  - Total: 2,120

Languages
  - Official: Tamil
- Time zone: UTC+5:30 (IST)

Ragunathapuram is a village in the Papanasam taluk of Thanjavur district, Tamil Nadu, India.

== Demographics ==
As per the 2001 census, Ragunathapuram had a total population of 2120 with 1028 males and 1092 females. The sex ratio was 1062. The literacy rate was 73.18.

The population had marginally increased to 2,263 as of the 2011 census.
