= Agaramangudi =

- village
- Location in Tamil Nadu, India Agaramangudi (India)
- Coordinates: 10.876228°N 79.227986°E
- Country: India
- State: Tamil Nadu
- District: Thanjavur

Population (2001)
  - Total: 2,300

Languages
  - Official: Tamil
- Time zone: UTC+5:30 (IST)

Agaramangudi is a village in the Papanasam taluk of Thanjavur district, Tamil Nadu, India.

== Demographics ==
As per the 2001 census, Agaramangudi had a total population of 2,300 with 1,171 males and 1,260 females. The sex ratio was 950. The literacy rate was 72.5. Compared to the beginning of 2001, the people there are well educated and well off. 90% of the people here are literate. 95% of the population is still dependent on agriculture. It is also one of the gradually rising villages. The areas are set up separately so that the people of the respective communities live separately. Some of the people here hold important high positions in government service. Many varieties of crops such as coconut and banana are cultivated throughout the year and are part of the trilogy. The annual festivals are celebrated in a special way without any competitive jealousy. It is one of the villages most affected by urbanization.
