= Sathiyamangalam, Thanjavur =

Sathiyamangalam
- village
- Country: India
- State: Tamil Nadu
- District: Thanjavur
- Taluk: Papanasam

Population (2001)
  - Total: 3,125

Languages
  - Official: Tamil
- Time zone: UTC+5:30 (IST)

Sathiyamangalam is a village in the Papanasam taluk of Thanjavur district, Tamil Nadu, India.

== Demographics ==
As per the 2001 census, Sathiyamangalam had a total population of 3125 with 1530 males and 1595 females. The sex ratio was 1042. The literacy rate was 56.47.
