= Pandaravadai =

Pandaravadai PDV
- village
- Interactive map of Pandaravadai
- Coordinates: 10°54′48″N 79°14′31″E
- Country: India
- State: Tamil Nadu
- District: Thanjavur
- Taluk: Papanasam

Population (2001)
  - Total: 7,710

Languages
  - Official: Tamil
- Time zone: UTC+5:30 (IST)
- Postal code: 614204
- Vehicle registration: TN68

Pandaravadai is a village in the Papanasam taluk of Thanjavur district, Tamil Nadu, India. It is located 22 km from Tanjore and 18 km from Kumbakonam. There is a river Kudamurutti helping the farmers to cultivate grains. There is also a railway station.

== Demographics ==
District Code:3, District Name: THANJAVUR, Block Code:6, Block Name: KUMBAKONAM, Village Code:27, Village Panchayat Name: PANDARAVADAI

Pandaravadai is one of the major villages of Papanasam taluk, Thanjavur dist., Tamil Nadu, India with a population of about 10000. It is situated on the highway between Thanjavur and Kumbakonam, 22 km from Thanjavur and 18 km from Kumbakonam. Majority of its residents are Muslims and Dalits, while Hindus live in Koilthevarayampettai. Soofi Nagar and its surroundings are hamlet of Pandaravadai.

It is predominantly agriculture based. A sizable population of people took up jobs in Far East Asia. As the opportunities in these countries diminished, educated younger generation opted for lucrative jobs in Arab countries of the Persian Gulf. Nowadays, every household in the village has at least one person in the Persian Gulf.

The level of education in the village is comparatively high in spite of absence of a high school as late as a decade ago. In order to fill the gap, we opted for an English-medium school in 1987, which recently blossomed into a higher secondary school, named Crescent Matric. Higher Secondary School. This school is being run by the management of the big mosque. Besides, there is a higher elementary school for boys, an elementary school for girls, both under the control of panchayat union, and a government aided elementary school.

The railway station, which has two platforms situated in Pandaravadai and shared with near village Rajagiri, and Government Hospital is situated in New Road (PUTHU ROAD) which is also shared with Pandaravadai and Rajagiri peoples.

As per the 2001 census, Pandaravadai had a total population of 7710 with 3631 males and 4079 females. The sex ratio was 1123. The literacy rate was 82.07. Its postal pincode is 614204.
