= Edavakkudi =

- village
- Country: India
- State: Tamil Nadu
- District: Thanjavur

Population (2001)
  - Total: 946

Languages
  - Official: Tamil
- Time zone: UTC+5:30 (IST)

Edavakkudi is a village in the Papanasam taluk of Thanjavur district, Tamil Nadu, India.

== Demographics ==
As per the 2001 census, Edavakkudi had a total population of 946 with 488 males and 458 females. The sex ratio was 939. The literacy rate was 70.17.
