= Edaiyiruppu =

- village
- Country: India
- State: Tamil Nadu
- District: Thanjavur

Population (2001)
  - Total: 1,297

Languages
  - Official: Tamil
- Time zone: UTC+5:30 (IST)

Edaiyiruppu is a village in the Papanasam taluk of Thanjavur district, Tamil Nadu, India.

== Demographics ==
As per the 2001 census, Edaiyiruppu had a total population of 1297 with 676 males and 621 females. The sex ratio was 919. The literacy rate was 58.53.
