= Olaipadi =

- village
- Location in Tamil Nadu, India Olaipadi (India)
- Coordinates: 10°58′35″N 79°18′48″E
- Country: India
- State: Tamil Nadu
- District: Thanjavur
- Taluk: Papanasam

Population (2001)
  - Total: 1,670

Languages
  - Official: Tamil
- Time zone: UTC+5:30 (IST)

Olaipadi is a village in the Papanasam taluk of Thanjavur district, Tamil Nadu, India. It has a temple of Vishnu.

== Demographics ==
As per the 2001 census, Olaipadi had a total population of 1670 with 832 males and 838 females. The sex ratio was 1007. The literacy rate was 70.01.
