= Ramanujapuram, Thanjavur =

Coordinates: 18°50′N 79°58′E

Ramanujapuram baskarapuram
- village
- Interactive map of Ramanujapuram
- Country: India
- State: Tamil Nadu
- District: Thanjavur
- Taluk: Papanasam

Population (2001)
  - Total: 2,217

Languages
  - Official: Tamil
- Time zone: UTC+5:30 (IST)
- Postal code: 614209

Ramanujapuram is a village in the Papanasam taluk of Thanjavur district, Tamil Nadu, India.

== Demographics ==
As per the 2001 census, Ramanujapuram had a total population of 2217 with 1115 males and 1102 females. The sex ratio was 988. The literacy rate was 56.55.
