= Thiyagasamudram =

Thiyagasamudram Thiyagai
- village
- Country: India
- State: Tamil Nadu
- District: Thanjavur
- Taluk: Papanasam

Population (2001)
  - Total: 2,745

Languages
  - Official: Tamil
- Time zone: UTC+5:30 (IST)

Thiyagasamudram is a village in the Papanasam taluk of Thanjavur district, Tamil Nadu, India.

== Demographics ==
As per the 2001 census, Thiyagasamudram had a total population of 2745 with 1381 males and 1364 females. The sex ratio was 1988. The literacy rate was 65.32.
