= Valuthoor =

- village
- Location in Tamil Nadu, India Valuthoor (India)
- Coordinates: 10.91804°N 79.22094°E
- Country: India
- State: Tamil Nadu
- District: Thanjavur
- Taluk: Papanasam

Languages
  - Official: Tamil
- Time zone: UTC+5:30 (IST)
- Nearest city: Tanjore and Kumbakonam
- Website: valoothoor.com

Valuthoor or Valathur is a small panchayat village located at papanasam taluk in Thanjavur district in the Indian state of Tamil Nadu. It is 18 km from Tanjore and 22 km from Kumbakonam. The river Kudamurutti passes through this village. In the 2011 census it had a population of 5161 in 1222 households.

== Geography ==
Valuthoor [Valoothoor] is a panchayat town of Thanjavur district, Tamil Nadu, located at10.91804°N 79.22094°E.

== Education ==
=== Schools ===
- Shaukathul Islam (B.M.S) Higher Secondary School(Govt aided), Main Road, Valuthoor.
- Alif Matriculation School(Pvt), umar street, Valuthoor.

=== Polytechnic College ===
- Government Polytechnic College - Regunathapuram -Valuthur - 614210 - Papanasam Taluk.

== Railway station ==
The nearest railway station is Ayyampettai (Thanjavur district) which is 2 km away from valuthoor.

== Police station ==
Valuthoor is under the control of Ayyampettai (Thanjavur district) Police station.

== Politics ==
=== Lok Sabha constituency ===
Valuthoor Parliament Lower House Constituency is part of Mayiladuthurai.

=== Tamil Nadu state constituency ===
Valuthoor assembly constituency is part of Papanasam.
