= Mahimalai =

Coordinates: 10°49′N 79°19′E

- village
- Interactive map of Mahimalai
- Country: India
- State: Tamil Nadu
- District: Thanjavur
- Taluk: Papanasam

Population (2001)
  - Total: 496

Languages
  - Official: Tamil
- Time zone: UTC+5:30 (IST)

Mahimalai is a village in the Papanasam taluk of Thanjavur district, Tamil Nadu, India. A Traditional village settled on the banks of the Vennaru.

== Demographics ==
As per the 2001 census, Mahimalai had a total population of 496 with 240 males and 256 females. The sex ratio was 1067. The literacy rate was 46.83.
