= Alavandipuram =

Coordinates: 10°57′N 79°19′E

- village
- Interactive map of Alavandipuram
- Country: India
- State: Tamil Nadu
- District: Thanjavur

Population (2001)
  - Total: 1,853

Languages
  - Official: Tamil
- Time zone: UTC+5:30 (IST)

Alavandipuram is a village in the Papanasam taluk of Thanjavur district, Tamil Nadu, India.

== Demographics ==
As per the 2001 census, Alavandipuram had a total population of 1853 with 884 males and 969 females. The sex ratio was 1096. The literacy rate was 63.8.
