= Sarukkai =

Coordinates: 10°56′N 79°15′E

- village
- Interactive map of Sarukkai
- Country: India
- State: Tamil Nadu
- District: Thanjavur
- Taluk: Papanasam

Population (2001)
  - Total: 2,432

Languages
  - Official: Tamil
- Time zone: UTC+5:30 (IST)

Sarukkai is a village in the Papanasam taluk of Thanjavur district, Tamil Nadu, India.

== Demographics ==
As per the 2001 census, Sarukkai had a total population of 2432 with 1238 males and 1194 females. The sex ratio was 964. The literacy rate was 62.64.
