= Devaryampettai =

- village
- Country: India
- State: Tamil Nadu
- District: Thanjavur

Population (2001)
  - Total: 851

Languages
  - Official: Tamil
- Time zone: UTC+5:30 (IST)

Devaryampettai is a village in the Papanasam taluk of Thanjavur district, Tamil Nadu, India.

== Demographics ==
As per the 2001 census, Devaryampettai had a total population of 851 with 440 males and 411 females. The sex ratio was 934. The literacy rate was 48.37.
