= Raghunathapuram, Nalgonda district =

Village in Telangana, India

Raghunathapuram is a village located in Nalgonda district, Telangana, India. It is 12 kilometres (7.5 mi) from the Sri Lakshmi Narasimha Swamy Temple in Yadagirigutta. It has a population of around 6,000 and is famous for manufacturing and exporting cotton cloth material.

== Education ==
Raghunathapuram has two government schools. Its primary school is Z.P.H.S Raghunathapuram, and it offers 6 to 10th standard in both Telugu and English.

== Economy ==
The village revenue is primarily generated from handlooms. Other sources of income include agriculture, grocery stores, textile shops, electronic repair centers, and construction material suppliers.

== Culture ==
Village residents are mostly Hindus, but some are Muslim and Christian. The village celebrates Hindu festivals, including Dasara, Vinayaka Chaviti, and Bonalu.
