= Eachankudi =

Ganapathy Agraharam Ganapathy Agraharam
- village
- Interactive map of Ganapathy Agraharam
- Coordinates: 10°54′01″N 79°08′53″E
- Country: India
- State: Tamil Nadu
- District: Thanjavur

Population (2001)
  - Total: 2,596

Languages
  - Official: Tamil
- Time zone: UTC+5:30 (IST)
- Postal code: 614202
- Vehicle registration: TN-68

Ganapathy agraharam is a village in the Papanasam taluk of Thanjavur district, Tamil Nadu, India.

== Demographics ==
As per the 2001 census, Eachankudi had a total population of 2596 with 1289 males and 1307 females. The sex ratio was 1014. The literacy rate was 72.78.
