= Soolamangalam =

Neighbourhood in Thanjavur district, Tamil Nadu, India

- Neighbourhood
- Soolamangalam, Thanjavur district, Tamil Nadu
- Coordinates: 10.8810°N 79.1958°E
- Country: India
- State: Tamil Nadu
- District: Thanjavur
- Elevation: 61.66 m (202.3 ft)

Population (2011)
  - Total: 1,859

Languages
  - Official: Tamil
  - Speech: Tamil
- Time zone: UTC+5:30 (IST)
- PIN: 614206
- LS: Mayiladuthurai
- VS: Papanasam

Soolamangalam is a village in Thanjavur district of Tamil Nadu state in India.

== Location ==
Soolamangalam is located with the coordinates of (10.8810°N 79.1958°E) with the PIN 614206 in Thanjavur district.

Soolamangalam (Tamil Nadu)

== Population ==
As per the 2011 census of India, the total population of Soolamangalam village which is under Papanasam panchayat union, was 1,859, out of which 934 persons weremales and 925 were females.

== Politics ==
Soolamangalam village comes under Papanasam Assembly constituency and also it belongs to Mayiladuthurai Lok Sabha constituency.
