= Vadakkumangudi =

Vadakkumangudi Vadakkumangudi
- Country: India
- State: Tamil Nadu
- District: Cuddalore
- Taluk: Kattumannarkoil

Government
  - Type: Gram Panchayat

Area
  - Total: 0.810815 km^{2} (0.313057 sq mi)

Population (2011)
  - Total: 617 ( As per 2,011. Census)
  - Density: 761/km^{2} (1,970/sq mi)

Languages
  - Official: Tamil, English
- Time zone: UTC+5:30 (IST)
- PIN: 608401
- Telephone code: 636977
- Sex ratio: mel ♂/♀

Vadakkumangudi is a village in Kattumannarkoil taluk, Cuddalore District, in India. It is situated in between Sirkazhi and Chidambaram and 16 km from KattumannarkoilAccording to Census 2011 information the location code or village code of Vadakkumangudi village is 636977. Vadakkumangudi village is located in Kattumannarkoil taluka of Cuddalore district in Tamil Nadu, India. It is situated 30 km away from sub-district headquarter Kattumannarkoil (tehsildar office) and 55 km away from district headquarter Cuddalore. As per 2009 stats, Vadakkumangudi village is also a gram panchayat.

The total geographical area of village is 210.08 hectares. Vadakkumangudi has a total population of 1,617 peoples, out of which male population is 824 while female population is 793. Literacy rate of vadakkumangudi village is 75.14% out of which 80.70% males and 69.36% females are literate. There are about 455 houses in vadakkumangudi village. Pincode of vadakkumangudi village locality is 608401.

Chidambaram is nearest town to vadakkumangudi village for all major economic activities..there is another village in Papanasam taluk of Tanjore district with the same name

It has three Hindu Temples Lord Subramaniyar kovil, Vinayagar, Arulmigu Mariyamman.
