= Papanasam taluk =

Administrative division in Tamil Nadu

Coordinates: 10°56′N 79°17′E

Papanasam taluk is a taluk of Thanjavur district of the Indian state of Tamil Nadu. The headquarters of the taluk is the town of Papanasam.

== Demographics ==
According to the 2011 census, the taluk of Papanasam had a population of 272,871 with 133,814 males and 139,057 females. This was an increase of 7% from the 2001 total of 255,093. There were 1,039 women for every 1,000 men, up from 1,027 per 1,000 males in 2001. The taluk had a literacy rate of 72.72%, slightly higher than 72.48% in 2001. Child population in the age group below 6 was 13,410 males and 12,682 females.

== Towns and villages ==
There are two panchayat towns in the taluk, Ayyampettai and the administrative headquarters, Papanasam. In 2011, there were 34 listed panchayat villages in Papanasam taluk, which have superintending control over more than seventy other villages. Tamil Nadu lists 120 revenue villages in Papanasam taluk.

- Adhanur
- Agaramangudi
- Alavandipuram
- Arulmolipet
- Arumanallur
- Athur Thottam
- Bhavaniyambalpuram
- Chakkarapalli
- Dalavaipalayam
- Deepambalpuram
- Devaryampettai
- Eachankudi
- Edaiyiruppu
- Edakkudi
- Edavakkudi
- Ganapathiagraharam
- Gopurajapuram
- Govindanattucheri
- Iluppaikorai
- Jambugapuram
- Kabisthalam
- Kandhavanam
- Karuppurpadugai
- Kondhagai
- Koonancheri
- Mahimalai
- Manalur
- Maruthuvakkudi
- Melakabisthalam
- Nadupadugai
- Neithalur
- Olaipadi
- Pandaravadai
- Pasupathikoil
- Perumalkoil
- Ponmeindanallur
- Porakkudi
- Pulimangalam
- Ragunathapuram
- Rajagiri
- Ramanujapuram
- Regunathapuram
- Sarabhojirajapuram
- Sarukkai
- [kottur))
- Someswarapuram
- Soolamangalam
- Soraikkaiyur
- Thirumandangudi
- Thiruvaigavur
- Thiyagasamudram
- Thurumbur
- Ullikadai
- Umayalpuram
- Umbalappadi
- Utharamangalam
- Vadakkumangudi
- Valuthoor
- Veeramangudi
