= Alandur (disambiguation) =

Alandur is a zone of Greater Chennai Corporation and an urban node in Chennai district, Tamil Nadu, India.

Alandur may also refer to these related to the zone in Chennai:

- Alandur (state assembly constituency)
- Alandur (Chennai Metro), a metro station
- Alandur taluk, subdistrict of Chennai district

== See also ==
- Alandurai, a village in Tamil Nadu, India
- Alanduraiappar Temple, Nallatthukkudi, a Hindu (Shiva) temple in Tamil Nadu, India
- Alandurainathar Temple, Pullamangai, a Hindu (Shiva) temple in Thanjavur district, Tamil Nadu, India
- Alanduraiyarkattalai, a village in Tamil Nadu, India
- Alanduraiyar Temple, a Hindu (Shiva) temple in Tamil Nadu, India
