= Chakravageswarar Temple, Chakkarappalli =

Shiva temple in Thanjavur district, Tamil Nadu, India

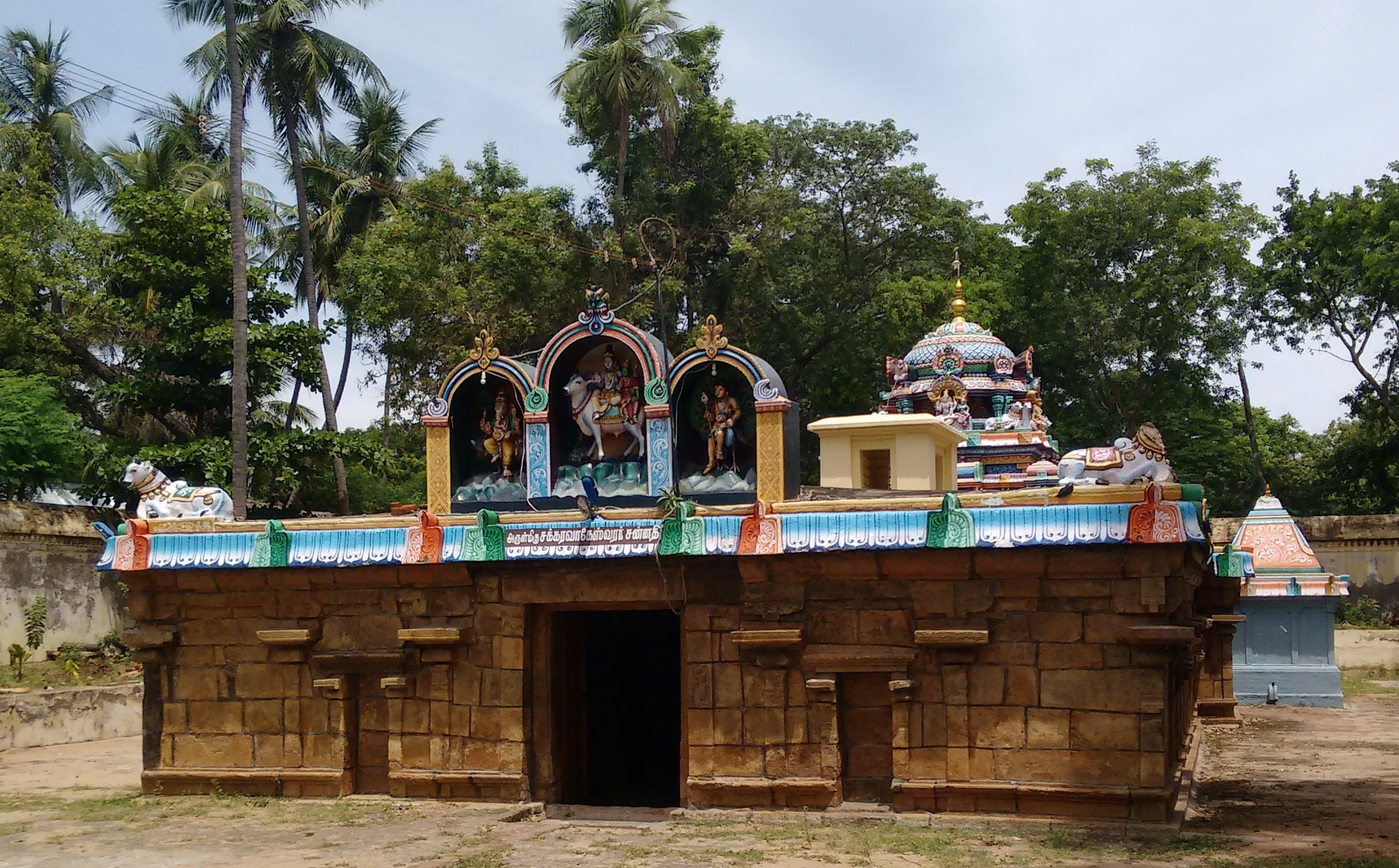

- Chakkaravageeswarar Temple, Chakkarapalli, Thanjavur district, Tamil Nadu

Religion
- Affiliation: Hinduism
- District: Thanjavur
- Deity: Chakravageswarar (Shiva), Devanayagi (Parvathi)
- Festival: Maha Shivaratri

Location
- Location: Chakkarapalli, Pasupathikoil
- State: Tamil Nadu
- Country: India
- Coordinates: 10.9007°N 79.1968°E

Architecture
- Type: Dravidian architecture

Specifications
- Temple: One
- Elevation: 62.48 m (205 ft)

Chakramangai or Chakravageswarar Temple is a Hindu temple dedicated to Hindu deity Shiva and is located in Chakkarapalli, Papanasam taluk of Thanjavur district, Tamil Nadu, India. The temple is incarnated by the hymns of Thevaram, the 7th century Tamil literature and is classified as Paadal Petra Sthalam. It is one of the 275 Paadal Petra Sthalams, where the three of the most revered Nayanars (Saivite Saints), Appar and Tirugnana Sambandar have glorified the temple with their verses during the 7th-8th century. The temple has been widely expanded by Chola kings during the 11th century.

The temple has six daily rituals at various times from 8:00 a.m. to 8 p.m., and four yearly festivals on its calendar. The Panguni Uthiram festival celebrated during the Tamil month of Panguni (March - April) is the major festival celebrated in the temple. The temple is maintained and administered by the Hindu Religious and Endowment Board of the Government of Tamil Nadu.

== Legend ==
This temple is one of the seven shrines associated with Saptamartrikas (seven female deities in Siva temple). The lord of this temple Shiva as Chakravageswarar. The Chakra (wheel) held by Vishnu has been acquired here as per saivite tradition. The name of the village is derived from the temple. As per one of the variants, Vishnu acquired the wheel after worshipping Amman in the temple. The place also seems to have acquired its name from Chakravala bird. The presiding deity of the temple is believed to have been worshipped by Surya, the Sun god. Every year, Sun's rays fall directly on the image of the presiding deity is quoted as the instance of the prayer.

== Architecture ==
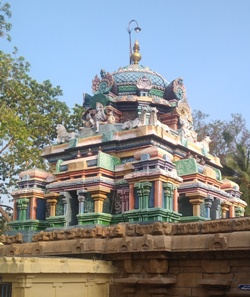
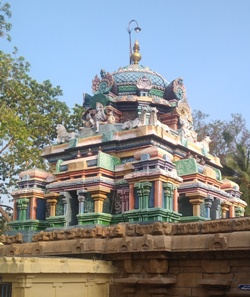
Vimana of the presiding deities

The temple is located in Chakrapalli, a village on the Thanjavur - Kumbakonam highway, located 27 km (17 mi) from Kumbakonam. The village is located on the banks of Kudamurutti River and is located 9 km (5.6 mi) away from Tiruvayyaru. The temple faces east and all the shrines are enclosed in a brick enclosure. The central shrine houses the image of Chakravgeeswarar in the form of Lingam (an iconic form of Shiva). The sanctum is square in shape with dimension of 4.75 m (15.6 ft). The ardhamandapa', the hall preceding the sanctum has a dimension of 8.95 km (5.56 mi) while the mukhamandapa is 15.21 km (9.45 mi) long. The Devakoshta images of Durga, Dakshinamurthy and Brahma are located in carinal directions on the walls around the sanctum. The entrance of the sanctum is flanked by Dvarapala dating back to the Chola period. The Vimana, the pyramidal shrine over the sanctum is circular and has two talas.

== History ==
The temple is believed to be present from the period of the medieval Chola emperor Aditya I (c. 870/71 – c. 907 CE). There are two inscriptions from the period of Rajaraja I (985–1014). The first one recorded as ARE 308 of 1965-66 indicates tax exemption of land of the temple. The epigraph written during the fifth regnal year also indicates the death of Sundara Chola, the father of king Rajaraja, in a golden palace. The second inscription recorded as ARE 309 of 1965-66 during the regnal period of Rajendra I (1012–1044) indicates exemption of tax to several pieces of land belonging to the temple. It also mentions that the ministry met in front of the Ganapathi shrine of the temple. The inscriptions indicate the installation of the image of Surya in the temple. Historians also believe based on hagiographical evidence that the place around the temple was once surrounded by lush green fields. The place should have also been a Jain learning center as indicated by Palli. Based on works from Sambandar, it is also inferred that the place was inhabited by merchants.

== Religious importance ==
The temple is one of the shrines of the 275 Paadal Petra Sthalams - Shiva Sthalams glorified in the early medieval Tevaram poems by Tamil Saivite Nayanar Sambandar. The temple is one of the seven shrines associated with Saptamartrikas (seven female deities in Siva temple). Matrikas are the different forms Adi Parashakti. Matrikas are the personified powers of different Devas. Brahmani emerged from Brahma, Vaishnavi from Vishnu, Maheshvari from Shiva, Indrani from Indra, Kaumari from Skanda, Varahi from Varaha and Chamunda from Devi, and additionals are Narasimhi, Vinayaki. This is one of the Saptamangai sthalams, seven sacred places devoted to Devi. They are also called as Saptastanam of Chakkarappalli. They are Chakkarappalli, Ariyamangai, Sulamangalam, Nallichery, Pasupathikovil, Thazhamangai and Pullamangai. The temple is counted as one of the temples built on the banks of River Kaveri. It is located on the banks of Kudamurutti, a tributary of river Kaveri.

== Worship practices and festivals ==
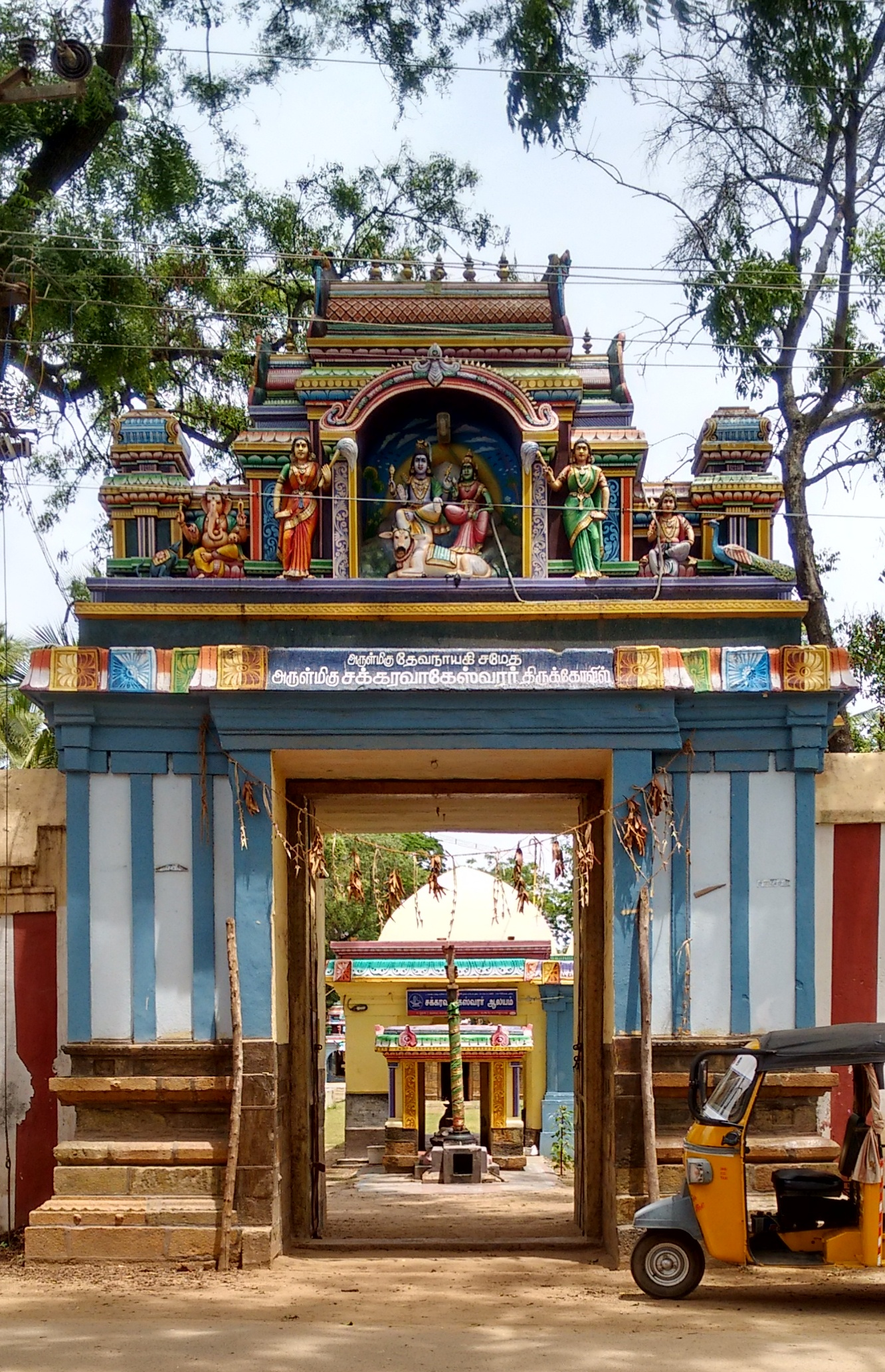
Temple entrance

The temple priests perform the pooja (rituals) during festivals and on a daily basis. Like other Shiva temples of Tamil Nadu, the priests belong to the Shaivaite community, a Brahmin sub-caste. The temple rituals are performed four times a day; Ushathkalam at Kalasanthi at 8:00 a.m., Uchikalam at 10:00 a.m., Sayarakshai at 6:00 p.m., and Ardha Jamam at 8:00 p.m. Each ritual comprises four steps: abhisheka (sacred bath), alangaram (decoration), neivethanam (food offering) and deepa aradanai (waving of lamps) for both Chakravageeswarar and Devanayagi. The worship is held amidst music with nagaswaram (pipe instrument) and tavil (percussion instrument), religious instructions in the Vedas read by priests and prostration by worshippers in front of the temple mast. There are weekly rituals like somavaram and sukravaram, fortnightly rituals like pradosham and monthly festivals like amavasai (new moon day), kiruthigai, pournami (full moon day) and sathurthi. Annabishekam during the Tamil month of Aipassi (October–November), Karthikai Deepan during November–December and Adi Sankaracharya Jayanti in Vaikasi (May–June) are the festivals celebrated in the temple.
