= Pasupatheesvarar Temple, Pasupathikovil =

Shiva temple in Tamil Nadu, India

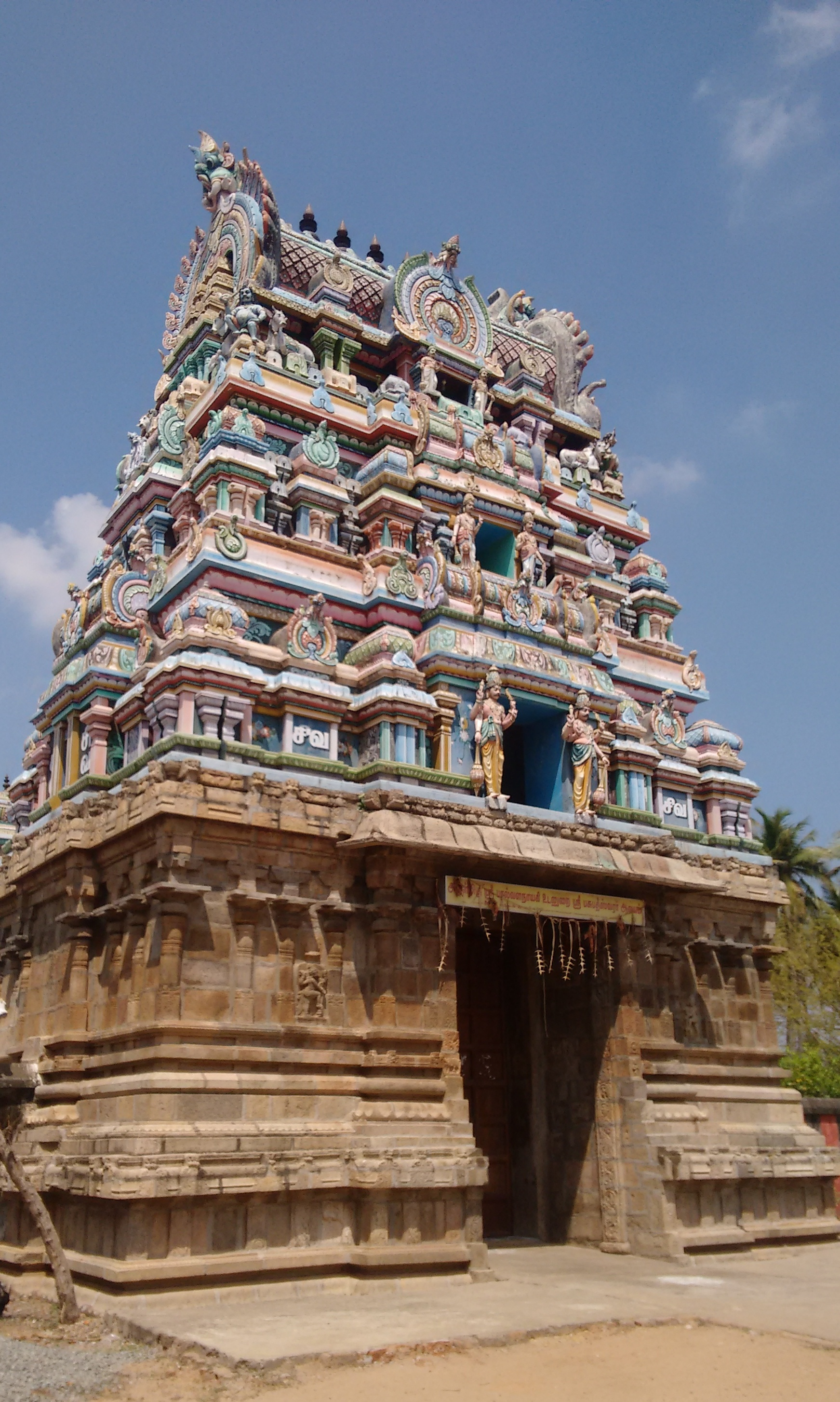
- gopura of the Pasupatheesvarar Temple

Religion
- Affiliation: Hinduism
- District: Thanjavur
- Deity: Pasupatheesvarar (Shiva), Palvalanayaki (Parvathi)

Location
- Location: Thanjavur-Kumbakonam main road
- State: Tamil Nadu
- Country: India
- Interactive map of Pasupatheesvarar Temple, Pasupathikovil
- Coordinates: 10.88391°N 79.18250°E

Pasupatheesvarar Temple is a Hindu temple dedicated to Lord Siva. It is located in Pasupathikoil of Thanjavur district, Tamil Nadu, India.

== Location ==
This temple is situated at Pasupathikoil, at distance of 14 km from Thanjavur on Thanjavur-Kumbakonam main road, and is one of the seven sacred places of the Chakkarappalli Saptastana.

== Saptamagai sthalam ==
This temple is one of the seven shrines associated with Saptamartrikas (seven female deities in Siva temple). Matrikas are the different forms Adi Parashakti. Matrikas are the personified powers of different Devas. Brahmani emerged from Brahma, Vaishnavi from Vishnu, Maheshvari from Shiva, Indrani from Indra, Kaumari from Skanda, Varahi from Varaha and Chamunda from Devi, and additionals are Narasimhi, Vinayaki. This is one of the Saptamangai sthalams, seven sacred places devoted to Devi. They are also called as Saptastanam of Chakkarappalli. They are:

- Chakkarappalli
- Ariyamangai
- Sulamangalam
- Nallichery
- Pasupathikovil
- Thazhamangai
- Pullamangai

== Presiding deity ==
The presiding deity in the garbhagriha is represented by the lingam known as Pasupatheesvarar. The Goddess is known as Palvalanayaki. The shrine of the presiding deity has mahamandapa, arthamandapa, anthrala and the garbhagriha. In the east, facing west Kasi Visvanatha linga, Subramania, Chandra and Surya are found. In between Chandra and Surya a window is found. At the east of the window a path is found for walking. Along with it a small gopura, in a different style is found. It is presumed that there might have been a gopura earlier and might have been destroyed. In due course it might have been built. As Varaha saved the earth from the asura, Kali in order to save from asuras, as Varahi appeared and worshipped the presiding deity. Kamadhenu did penance in this place. So many places were identified by cows. This is one such sacred place. The presiding deity was worshipped by the cow and so the Goddess was known as Palvalanayaki. While Anavidyanatha Sharma along with his wife came and worshipped here, she also blessed them.

== Temple structure ==
This temple was first built by Kochchenganan. The temple is situated in the north east of the village. The entrance is facing east. It has three tier rajagopura, the biggest in these seven temples. On either side of the entrance sculptures of Thanjavur Nayak style are found. After crossing over the 7 m x 10 m entrance of the gopura, one can enter into the temple premises. It has two structures one for presiding deity and another for the consort. This temple has one big outer prakara. A bali pita and rishaba are found in the outer prakara. In the prakara, vilva tree, shrines of Dakshinamurthy, Jestadevi, Nagavalli, temple well, Sanisvara and Bhairava are found. In the north west of the outer prakara two shrines are found. In one shrine naga devata is set up. Next to this shrine, Gajalakshmi shrine is found. Through the steps found in southern side, the shrine of the presiding deity could be reached. The shrine is 5 m above the ground floor. Upper floor has two sections. In this floor shrines of Uchista Vinayaka, presiding deity and Goddess are found. The main shrines are found on the upper floor, at a height of 3 m. After going through the steps Ganesha shrine could be reached.

== Photogallery ==
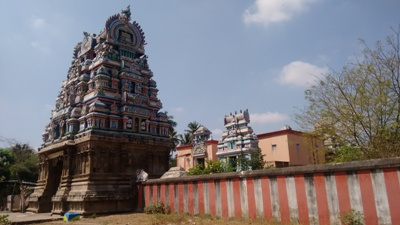

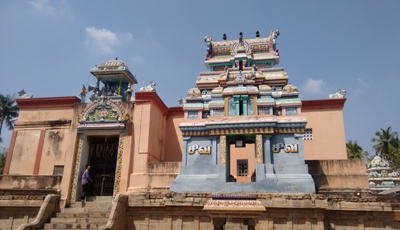

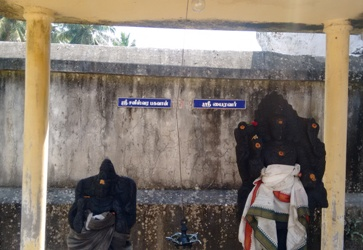

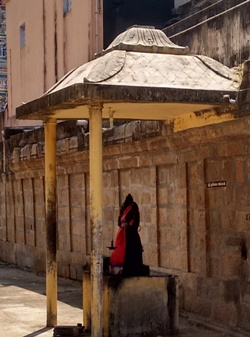

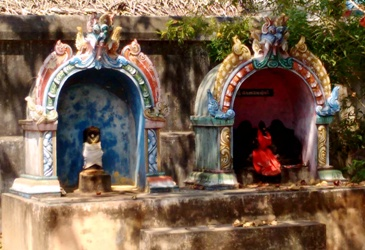

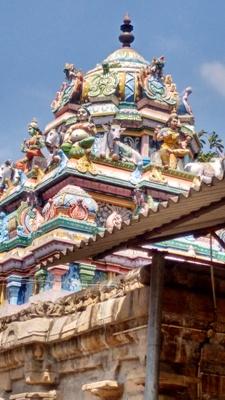

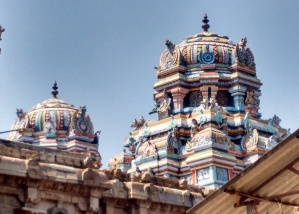
