= Chandramouleesvarar Temple, Thazhamangai =

Shiva temple in Tamil Nadu, India

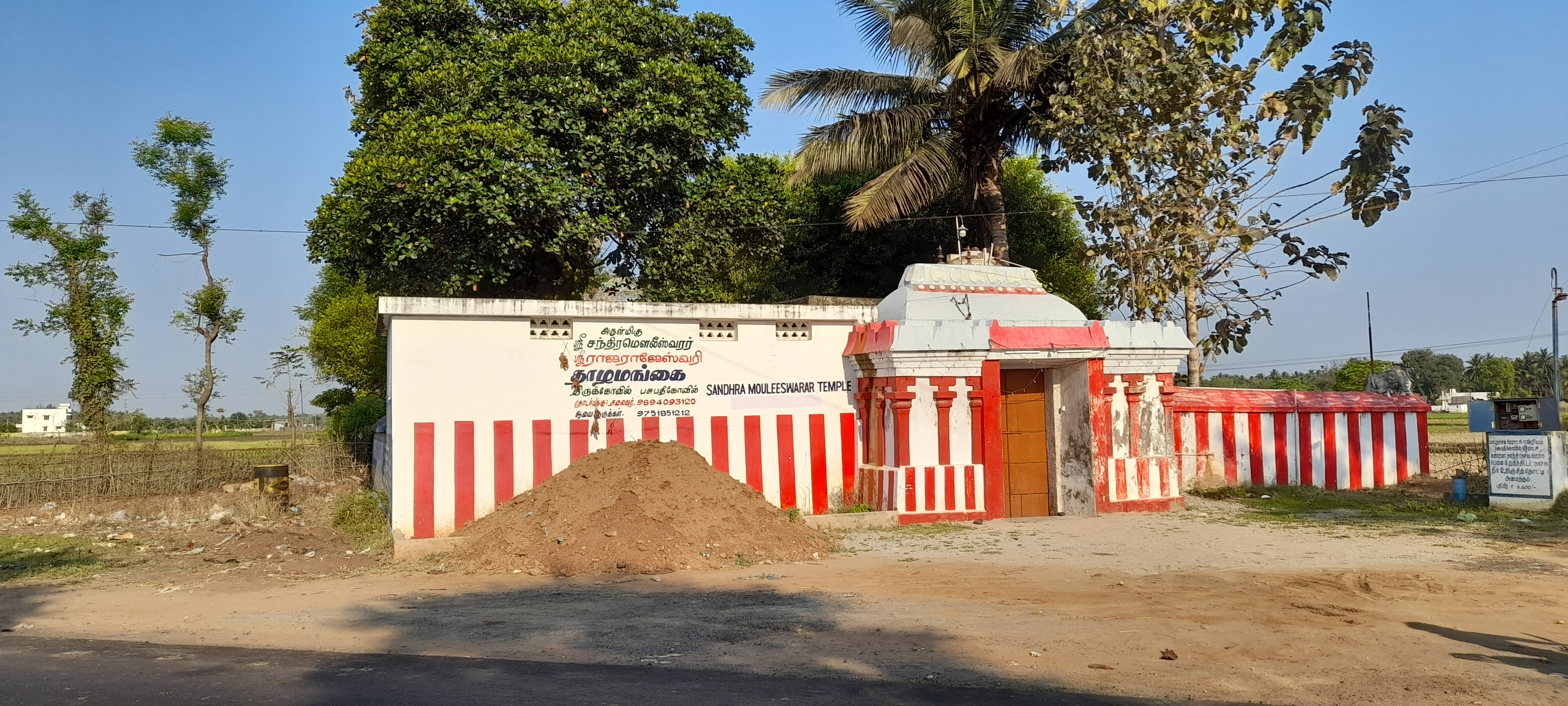

- Chandramouleeswarar Temple, Thallhamangai, Thanjavur district, Tamil Nadu

Religion
- Affiliation: Hinduism
- District: Thanjavur
- Deity: Chandramouleesvarar (Shiva), Rajarajesvari (Parvathi)
- Festival: Maha Shivaratri

Location
- Location: Thanjavur-Kumbakonam main road, Thallhamangai
- State: Tamil Nadu
- Country: India
- Interactive map of Chandramouleesvarar Temple, Thazhamangai
- Coordinates: 10.883645°N 79.175695°E

Specifications
- Temple: One
- Elevation: 57.78 m (190 ft)

Chandramouleesvarar Temple is a Hindu temple dedicated to Lord Siva located in Thazhamangai of Thanjavur district, Tamil Nadu, India.

== Location ==
This temple is situated at Thazhamangai, at distance 13 km from Thanjavur in Thanjavur-Kumbakonam main road. This is one of the seven sacred places of the Chakkarappalli Saptastana, worshipped by Indrani.

== Saptamagai sthalam ==
This temple is one of the seven shrines associated with Saptamartrikas (seven female deities in Siva temple). Matrikas are the different forms Adi Parashakti. Matrikas are the personified powers of different Devas. Brahmani emerged from Brahma, Vaishnavi from Vishnu, Maheshvari from Shiva, Indrani from Indra, Kaumari from Skanda, Varahi from Varaha and Chamunda from Devi, and additionals are Narasimhi, Vinayaki. This is one of the Saptamangai sthalams, seven sacred places devoted to Devi. They are also called as Saptastanam of Chakkarappalli. They are:

- Chakkarappalli
- Ariyamangai
- Sulamangalam
- Nallichery
- Pasupathikovil
- Thazhamangai
- Pullamangai

== Presiding deity ==
Daksha, cursed Chandra, as he loved only his daughter Rohini and not taking into consideration others. For the children, he met Chandra. Chandra did not heed his advice. Daksha cursed him and the power of Chandra got waned. The power of Chandra got reduced. He felt sorry for what he did. He came to Thazhamangai and worshipped the presiding deity and got his curse cured. As Chandra worshipped the deity, the presiding deity is known as Chandramouleesvarar. The presiding deity in the garbhagriha is represented by the lingam known as Chandramouleesvarar. The Goddess is known as Rajarajesvari. The complete structure of garbhagriha is made of brick. No granite is found. The architectural style which is generally found in the temples of Thanjavur could not be seen here. The presiding deity might have been taken from the dilapidated structure which was in existence through so many centuries and is kept now. A close look at the bana, the top portion of linga, would make one to understand its ancient nature. The shrine of the Goddess is found in the north. It is facing south. The Goddess is having four hands and is found in standing posture. In the east of the temple, the temple tirta, known as Chandra tirta, is found.

== Temple structure ==
The length of the temple wall in north–south is 15 m and 30 m in east–west. The entrance is found in the east. No gopura is found above the entrance. During renovation in 2008 a small gopura like structure has been built. After crossing over the entrance, the office and kitchen are found, in the let. In between the main temple and the entrance a concrete mandapa with granite floor is found. Balipita and nandhi are found. At the end of the mandapa, after crossing over the entrance, Vinayaka and Balamuruga are found on either side. On the left a small prakara is found. Except the basement of this prakara, on three sides temple garden is maintained. In the north of the prakara, shrine of Chandikesvarar is found. Chandikesvara belongs to 10th century CE.

== Inscription ==
In inscription Thazhamangai is called as Nittha Vinotha Valanattu Kizhar Kutrathu Bavadhayamangalam. Very near to this place Kizhar, the town of Sangam age was found.
