= Jambukesvarar Temple, Nallichery =

Shiva temple in Thanjavur district, Tamil Nadu, India

Jambukesvarar Temple, Nallicheri
- Jambukeswarar Temple, Nallicheri, Thanjavur district, Tamil Nadu

Religion
- Affiliation: Hinduism
- District: Thanjavur
- Deity: Jambukesvarar (Shiva), Akilandesvari (Parvathi)

Location
- Location: Thanjavur-Kumbakonam main road, Nallicheri
- State: Tamil Nadu
- Country: India
- Coordinates: 10.8736°N 79.1774°E

Architecture
- Elevation: 57.74 m (189 ft)

Jambukesvarar Temple is a Hindu temple to Shiva in Nallicheri of Thanjavur district, Tamil Nadu, India.

== Location ==
This temple is situated at Nallicheri, at distance 13 km from Thanjavur in Thanjavur-Kumbakonam main road. An arch entrance has stucco figures of Shiva and Vishnu. The temple can be reached through Pasupatikovil, the fifth sacred place of the Chakkarappalli Saptastana.

== Saptamagai sthalam ==
This temple is one of the seven shrines associated with Saptamartrikas (seven female deities in Siva temple). Matrikas are the different forms Adi Parashakti. Matrikas are the personified powers of different Devas. Brahmani emerged from Brahma, Vaishnavi from Vishnu, Maheshvari from Shiva, Indrani from Indra, Kaumari from Skanda, Varahi from Varaha and Chamunda from Devi, and additionals are Narasimhi, Vinayaki. This is one of the Saptamangai sthalams, seven sacred places devoted to Devi. They are also called as Saptastanam of Chakkarappalli. They are:

- Chakkarappalli
- Ariyamangai
- Sulamangalam
- Nallicheri
- Pasupathikovil
- Thazhamangai
- Pullamangai

== Presiding deity ==
The presiding deity in the garbhagriha is represented by the lingam known as Jambukesvarar. His consort is known as Akilandesvari. The presiding deity is facing east. The western gopura entrance which is found in the west of the shrine was set up during renovation. The entrance gate has a window, through which the graveyard of Nallichery could be seen. It is so set up that the ray of the fire which is lit during the burning of the corpses would reflect on linga. Shiva is worshipped by Sun during February/March for three days in the evening. At that time the rays of the Sun would fall on the presiding deity. The shrine of Akilandesvari is in the north of the mandapa in sitting posture. She is with four hands. While two hands hold mala and flower respectively other two hands are in abaya and varada postures. Nandhi worshipped this place and a sculpture depicting it could be seen in this temple. As in Tiruvanaikka, the names of the presiding deity and consort are found as Jambukesvarar and Akilandesvari.

== Temple structure ==
The temple premises, in an area of 74 m x 50 m are found with a wall and one prakara. One has to enter the temple through the main entrance which is found in the southern wall. Through this entrance, the shrine of the consort deity could be reached. After entering the southern entrance, a vault type mandapa. There are shrines of two Vinayakas, Subramania with his consorts Valli, Nataraja and Gajalakshmi are found. In the east of the prakara, shrines of Bhairava and Navagraha are found. In the north of garbagriha Chandikesvarar shrine is found. Temple tirtta, known as temple tank, is Uppukaichikkulam and in the south Sorudayan Vaikkal known as Gautama Madhi and Devagatha tirtta are found. This place is also called as Nandhimangai. Vaishnavi one of the Saptamatas worshipped this deity. Anavidyanatha Sharma along with his wife came and worshipped here.
