= Kiruthivakesvarar Temple, Sulamangalam =

Shiva temple in Thanjavur district, Tamil Nadu, India

Kiruthivakesvarar Temple, Soolamangalam
- Kiruthivakesvarar Temple, Soolamangalam, Thanjavur district, Tamil Nadu

Religion
- Affiliation: Hinduism
- District: Thanjavur
- Deity: Kiruthivakesvarar
- Festival: Maha Shivaratri

Location
- Location: Soolamangalam
- State: Tamil Nadu
- Country: India
- Interactive map of Kiruthivakesvarar Temple, Soolamangalam
- Coordinates: 10.8818°N 79.1922°E

Architecture
- Type: Dravidian architecture

Specifications
- Temple: One
- Elevation: 61.91 m (203 ft)

Kiruthivakesvarar Temple is a Hindu temple dedicated to the deity Shiva, located at Soolamangalam near Ayyampet in Thanjavur district in Tamil Nadu, India.

== Vaippu Sthalam ==
It is one of the shrines of the Vaippu Sthalams sung by Tamil Saivite Nayanar Appar. As Suladevar worshipped this place this place was known as Sulamangalam.

== Presiding deity ==
The presiding deity in the garbhagriha is represented by the lingam known as Kiruthivakesvarar. The Goddess is known as Alankaravalli.

== Specialities ==
Shiva has among other things one of the weapon or symbol known as Astradeva. Due to this he is known as Sulapani, the bearer of Astra (Sulam).Astradeva worshipped the deity of this temple. Shiva appeared before him and blessed him stating that as my weapon, you would get the primary places in all the temple festivals and would be taken. From then the first puja was done to Astradeva. The presiding deity is also known as Kari Urittha Nayanar, as he killed the elephant. As Shiva killed the asura known as Kayasuran, he is known as Kiruthivakesvarar. The asura gave disturbance to one and all. Unable to bear his disturbance all went to Kasi. Kayasuran also went there. While all of them worshipped the Lord of Kasi, Shiva saved them from him. In the Manikarnika Ghat he appeared as Linga and was known as Kiruthivakesvarar.

== Structure ==
Astra devar can be found standing in front of the temple, He is of 4.5 feet height. Dakshinamurthy who is found in the kosta is found without the banyan tree. He is found with jadamudi. During Thai Amavasai special pujas are held. Of the saptamatas, Kaumari worshipped here. Parvati did penance in front of the deity here. She is also found holding a trishul in her hand. The Goddess blessed the couple Nathasanma-Anavitha who came from North India.

== Saptamagai sthalam ==
This temple is one of the seven shrines associated with Saptamartrikas (seven female deities in Siva temple). Matrikas are the different forms Adi Parashakti. Matrikas are the personified powers of different Devas. Brahmani emerged from Brahma, Vaishnavi from Vishnu, Maheshvari from Shiva, Indrani from Indra, Kaumari from Skanda, Varahi from Varaha and Chamunda from Devi, and additionals are Narasimhi, Vinayaki. This is one of the Saptamangai sthalams, seven sacred places devoted to Devi. They are also called as Saptastanam of Chakkarappalli. They are:

- Chakkarappalli
- Ariyamangai
- Sulamangalam
- Nallichery
- Pasupathikovil
- Thazhamangai
- Pullamangai

== Location ==
In Thanjavur-Kumbakonam road, in the Railway station road at a distance of 1 km this temple is situated. As Suladevar worshipped this place this place was known as Sulamangalam.
