= Harimukteesvarar Temple, Ariyamangai =

Shiva temple in Thanjavur district, Tamil Nadu, India

- Harmukteeswarar Temple, Ariyamangai, Thanjavur district, Tamil Nadu

Religion
- Affiliation: Hinduism
- District: Thanjavur
- Deity: Harimukteesvarar (Shiva), Gnanambikai Amman (Parvathi)
- Festival: Maha Shivaratri

Location
- Location: Thanjavur-Kumbakonam main road, Ariyamangai
- State: Tamil Nadu
- Country: India
- Interactive map of Harimukteesvarar Temple, Ariyamangai
- Coordinates: 10.890995°N 79.201809°E

Architecture
- Temple: One

Harimukteesvarar Temple is a Hindu temple dedicated to Lord Siva located in Ariyamangai of Thanjavur district, Tamil Nadu, India

== Location ==
This temple is situated at a distance of 10 km from Chakkarapalli in Thanjavur-Kumbakonam main road. From Chakkarappalli one road leads to Agaramangudi, in south direction. On this road another road is found in south. On this road the railway crosses. It is very difficult for the vehicles to cross the unmanned railway line. To reach the temple one has to walk to some distance.

== Saptamagai sthalam ==
This temple is one of the seven shrines associated with Saptamartrikas (seven female deities in Siva temple). Matrikas are the different forms Adi Parashakti. Matrikas are the personified powers of different Devas. Brahmani emerged from Brahma, Vaishnavi from Vishnu, Maheshvari from Shiva, Indrani from Indra, Kaumari from Skanda, Varahi from Varaha and Chamunda from Devi, and additionals are Narasimhi, Vinayaki. This is one of the Saptamangai sthalams, seven sacred places devoted to Devi. They are also called as Saptastanam of Chakkarappalli. They are:

- Chakkarappalli
- Ariyamangai
- Sulamangalam
- Nallichery
- Pasupathikovil
- Thazhamangai
- Pullamangai

== Presiding deity ==
The presiding deity in the garbhagriha is represented by the lingam known as Harimukteesvarar. The Goddess is known as Gnanambikai Amman. The linga is of one metre high. On the right Vinayaka and left Subramania are found. The garbhagriha has a small vimana. On either side of the entrance dvarapalakas made of stucco are found. At the facade stucco figures from the history of the temple are found. The shrine of the Goddess is found in the left, facing east. As Vishnu worshipped the presiding deity, he is known as Harimukteesvarar, Hari means Vishnu.

== Temple structure ==
The temple has a compound wall. The temple is in a raised position and has cement floor. The temple does not have regular structures. In front of the main shrine, bali pita and nandhi mandapa are found. The entrance is facing east. No gopura is found. In the north of the garbagriha, Saptamatas are found. Very near to them five of saptamatas belonging to 9th century CE are found. Even though no kosta like structure is found, in the south Dakshinamurthy of 13th century CE and in the north Durga are is found. On the right side of the main shrine, shrines of Vishnu and Ayurdevi are found. It seems that Ayurdevi is of recent addition set up by the locals. Ayurdevi is with twelve hands. Maheshvari, one of the saptamatas, worshipped the deity. Ganges is the temple tirtta of the temple.
