= Alandurainathar Temple, Pullamangai =

Shiva temple in Thanjavur district, Tamil Nadu, India

Pullamangai Brahmapureeswarar Temple, Pasupathi Kovil
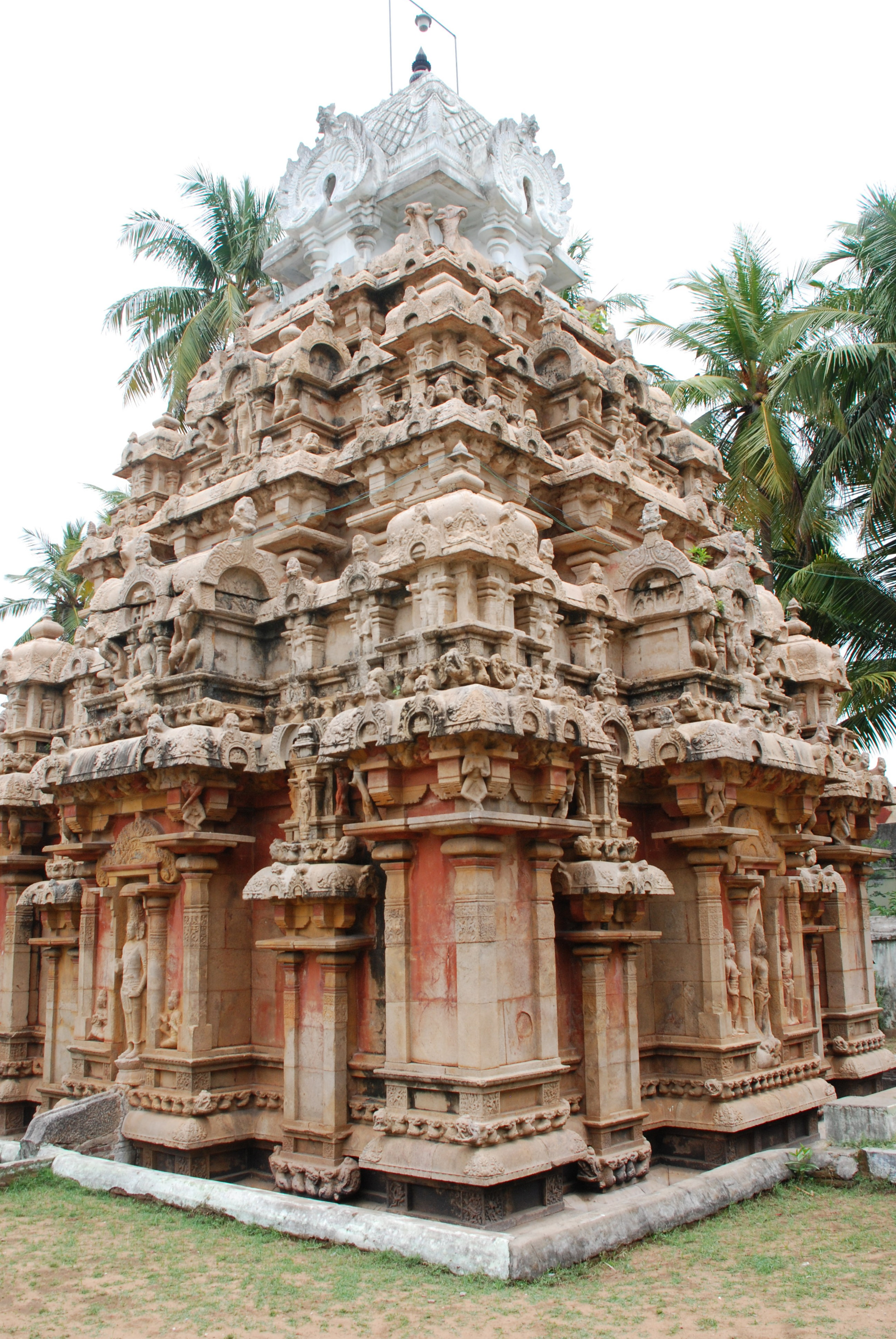

- Brahmapureeswarar Temple, Pullamangai, Thanjavur district, Tamil Nadu

Religion
- Affiliation: Hinduism
- District: Thanjavur
- Deity: Brahmapureeswarar (Shiva); Anandeeswarar (Shiva)
- Festival: Maha Shivaratri

Location
- Location: Pullamangai, Pasupathikoil
- State: Tamil Nadu
- Country: India
- Coordinates: 10.8907°N 79.1751°E

Architecture
- Type: Dravidian architecture

Specifications
- Temple: One
- Elevation: 62.55 m (205 ft)

Tirupullamangai or Thirupullamangai is a Hindu temple of the Hindu god Siva at Pullamangai, in Pasupathikoil, Papanasam taluk of Thanjavur district, Tamil Nadu, India. It is one of the shrines of the 275 Paadal Petra Sthalams - Shiva Sthalams in the early medieval Tevaram poems by Tirugnanasambandar, a Tamil Saivite Nayanar.

== Architecture ==
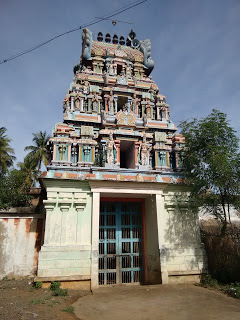
Entrance

The shrine faces east; the temple is entered through a small gopuram (entrance tower) on the eastern side of the enclosing wall. Both of these, along with the hall, directly in front of the entrance, are of later date than the original temple, as are various subsidiary buildings on either sides of the gopuram and the goddess shrine in the north of the hall. The original parivara (attendant deities) have disappeared. The temple is counted as one of the temples built on the banks of the River Kaveri as it is on the banks of the Kudamurutti River, a tributary of the Kaveri.

== Saptamangai sthalam ==
This temple is one of the seven shrines associated with Saptamartrikas (seven female deities in Siva temple). Matrikas are the different forms Adi Parashakti. Matrikas are the personified powers of different Devas. Brahmani emerged from Brahma, Vaishnavi from Vishnu, Maheshvari from Shiva, Indrani from Indra, Kaumari from Skanda, Varahi from Varaha and Chamunda from Devi, and additionals are Narasimhi, Vinayaki. This is one of the Saptamangai sthalams, seven sacred places devoted to Devi. They are also called as Saptastanam of Chakkarappalli. They are:

- Chakkarappalli
- Ariyamangai
- Sulamangalam
- Nallichery
- Pasupathikovil
- Thazhamangai
- Pullamangai

== History ==
According to historian Harle, the temple is counted among the four early extant temples of the Chola Empire, with the other three being Koranganatha Temple in Tiruchirappalli district, Moovar Koil in Pudukottai district and Nageswaran temple at Kumbakonam These temples follow the Pallava architecture which are relatively small in size. They all have a fair-sized porch, locally called ardhamandapa attached to the sanctum, both of which are slightly below the ground level in a pit kind of structure. The structures are also predominantly built of stone.

The garbhagriha(sanctum) and the arthamandapa(secluded hall) of the temple belong to the earlier structure, while there have been newer structures added to it lately. All the parivara(consort) shrines of the earlier period have not survived and few newer shrines have come up. The sculptures of this temple is acclaimed. Apart from the lovely devakoshta(divine) images of Dakshinamurthy, Lingodhbhavar, Brahma and Durga, the vimana(shrine) too houses exquisite images of Vishnu, Narashima, Tripurantaka. The temple has series of miniature panels depicting scenes from Ramayana. The sculpting in this temple is of high class and speaks volume of Chola artistry.

== Miniature sculptures in the temple ==
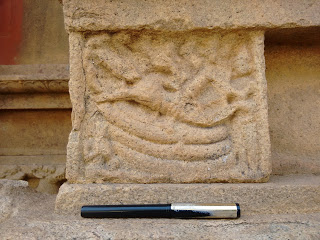

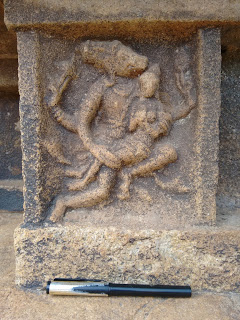

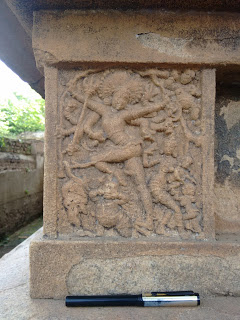

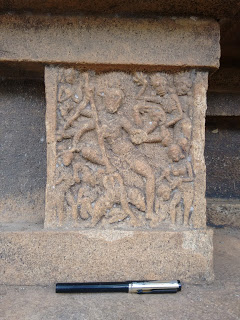

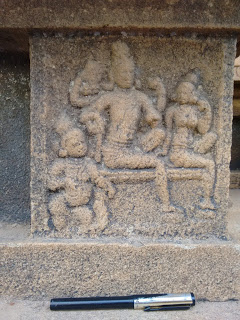

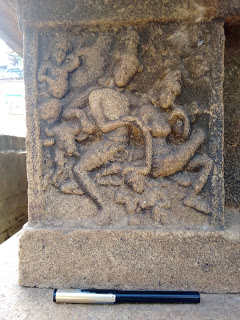

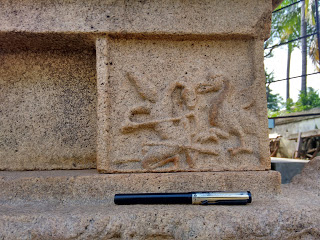
