= Sthala Vriksha =

Sacred tree associated with a Hindu temple

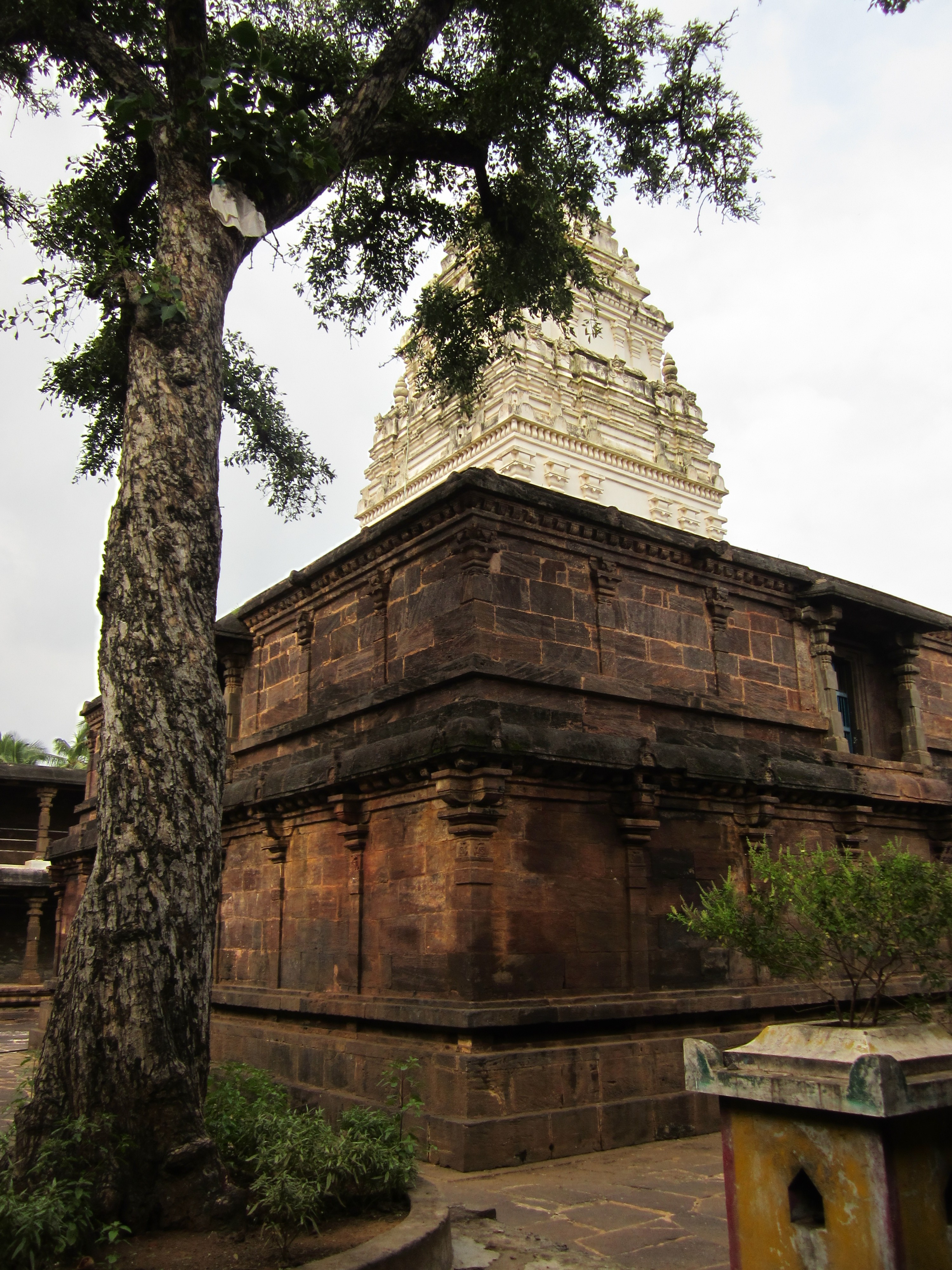
A Sthala Vriskha situated near a gopuram.

A Sthala Vriksha (Sanskrit: स्थलवृक्ष, romanized: Sthalavṛkṣa, lit. 'temple-tree'), also rendered Sthala Vruksham refers to a sacred tree associated with a site, most often a Hindu temple. Such trees form a prominent feature of koils, Hindu temples of the Dravidian style.

Besides the dominant feature of a temple's architecture, comprising the gopuram (gateway tower), vimanam (tower), and the sanctum, the temple tree is also considered holy. Some temples and historical places derive their names from such trees. In the contemporary era, the importance of these trees are reiterated by doing pujas to them, and tying sacred threads and bells during days of religious importance.

== Significance ==
Several historical Hindu temples are associated with a tree. Trees are found to symbolise growth and prosperity. In South Indian village folklore, there is a tree or forest associated with goddesses like Kali, Amman, Mariamman, or Ellai Pidari. When the trees or the forests are not properly maintained, the residents are believed to get punished in the form of a poor harvest or famine. The forests names and the deities are closely associated in Shaiva lore. The temple at Thirukkuvalai is referred to be located in a forest called Kathakaranya, after the temple tree. Bilva (Aegle marmelos) is the most common Sthala Vriksha in Shiva temples, while the leaves of Tulasi (Ocimum tenuiflorum) is considered sacred for Vishnu temples. The other common Sthala Vrikshas are neem (Azadirachta indica), peepal (Ficus religiosa), marudhu (Terminalia paniculata) and kanikonna (Cassia fistula). The selection of the colour of flowers varies according to the deities. While white, blue, and yellow flowers are considered sacred to Krishna and Vishnu, red and shades of orange are considered sacred to Shiva. According to the Ramayana, the word Sthala Vriksha is a mixture of Yakshaya Chaitya (the tree with the spirit within) and Vriksha Chaitya (the protector tree), indicating the sacred tree in each region.

=== Associated deities ===
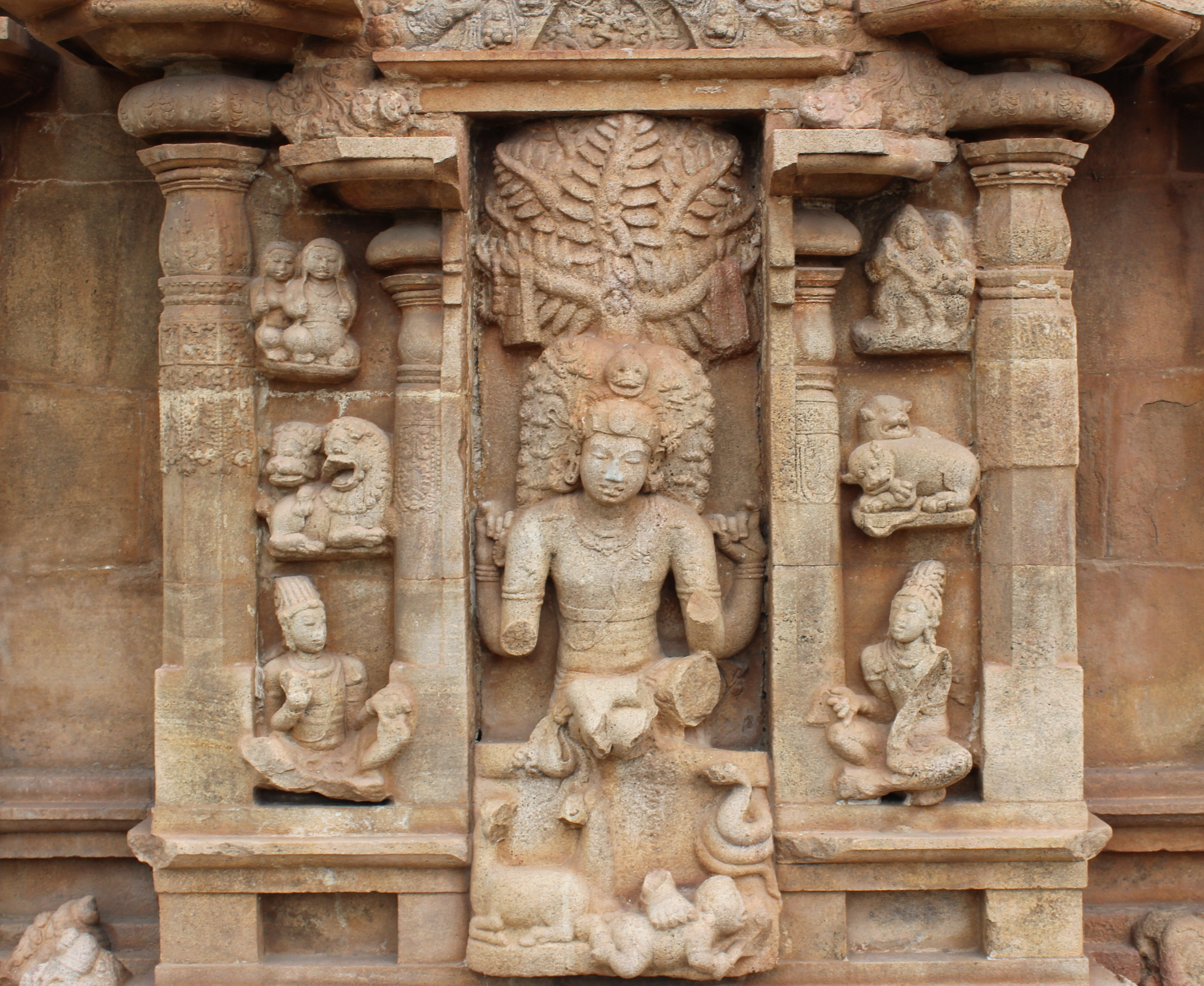
Image of Dakshinamurthy in the form of a tree of knowledge in Koranganatha Temple, Chola sculpture, 9th century

Dakshinamurthy is an aspect of the Hindu god Shiva as a guru (teacher) of all types of knowledge. This aspect of Shiva, as the original guru, is his personification as the supreme or the ultimate awareness, understanding and knowledge. In this aspect as Dakshinamurti, Shiva is generally shown with four arms. He is depicted seated under a banyan tree, facing the south. Shiva is seated upon a deer-throne, and surrounded by sages who receive his instruction.

The karanja tree is associated with Narasimha, who is said to have offered a darshana to Hanuman under it, a form called Karanja Narasimhar.

== Location ==
The Sthala Vriksha is located on ground or on an elevated platform. It is usually located on the outer prakara, the precincts of the temple. In most Shiva temples, it is located behind the sanctum. The tree is used as a deity in itself in most temples where people hang strings and filial to pray for their needs. As a worship practice, people circumambulate and prostrate before it. Sometimes the trees are anointed with strings to arrest the spirit within. There are cult statues placed around the trees describing the deities, which are worshipped. Western scholars have viewed the planting of the trees within the precinct as a means of protecting the environment. Usually, a square platform is built around the tree and a circumambulatory passage is built around it. The image of the deities or serpent stones are placed in the temple. When the tree dies for some reason, another tree is planted in the same location. Spiritually, it is considered as the rebirth cycle. According to the historian Soundara Rajan, the institutionalization of the temple trees, temple history, and the festival calendar in South Indian temples was initiated during the 11th century.

== Literature ==
Hindu texts refer to the sacred temple-tree as the Chitra Vriksha. Specific mentions of the temple tree and its history appear in the Padma Purana and the Matsya Purana. Various Sthala Vrikshas are mentioned in Sangam literature like Agananuru and Purananuru. Later religious texts compiled in the Tevaram by saint-poets like Appar, Sundarar, Sambandar, and Manikkavacakar make multiple mentions of various temple trees.

Vasudha Narayanan has suggested that a Sthala Vriksha is usually considered as a representation of a larger presence of species.

Ramayana, the Hindu epic, offers descriptions of all the trees of the forests in the regions traversed by Rama, denoting their significance.

Some Sthala Vrikshas are identified with the wish-giving tree called the kalpavriksha.
