= Alanduraiappar Temple, Nallatthukkudi =

Shiva temple in Tamil Nadu, India

Coordinates: 11°06′01″N 79°41′28″E

Alanduraiappar Temple is a Hindu temple dedicated to the deity Shiva, located at Nallathukudi village near Mayiladuthurai, in Mayiladuthurai district, Tamil Nadu, India.

== About ==
This temple is one of the shrines of the Vaippu Sthalams sung by Appar, a Tamil Saivite Nayanar. Visitors may view the daily worship ritual of offering flowers or fruit.

== History ==
Other names for the temple in the past may include "Nallakkudi," "Kuyiladuthurai," and "Kuyiladunthurai." According to historian R. P. Sethu Pillai, it was called "Kuyiladuthurai" and "Kuyilalanthurai". U. V. Swaminatha Iyer instead identifies the name "Kuyilanthurai" as referring to the temple "Karunguyilnathampettai", north of Dharmapuram. The Kumbhabhishekham of the temple was held on 8 June 1970.

== Presiding deity ==
The presiding deity in the garbhagriha (sanctum sanctorum), represented by the lingam, is known as Alanduraiappar. The goddesses of the temple are Kuyiladu Nayaki and Kuyilanda Nayaki. While in Mayiladuthurai and Mylapore, where the goddess worshipped the presiding deity in peacock form, at this temple, she worshipped Shiva in the form of a koel, and therefore she is known as Kuyiladu Nayaki and Kuyilanda Nayaki.

== Origins ==
The presiding deity was worshipped by Surya. Surya Pushkarani is the temple tirtha. It is believed that those who take a holy bath in the tirtha (holy water) will rid themselves of long-term diseases.

== Structure ==
The temple has no gopuram (tower) and has only one entrance. At the entrance, there is a statue of Nandi, a place for bali pīṭham (sacrifices), and the shrine of the presiding deity, which is said to be facing the west and his consort facing the south. In the Prakaram (courtyard), there are shrines for Navagraha, Bhairava, Shani, and Dakshinamurthy. In the front, there is a mandapa (hall) for Vinayaka and Subramania and their consorts Valli and Deivanai. The temple tree is a Vilva.

== Location ==
The temple is located at Nallathukudi, at a distance of 2 km from Mayiladuthurai on the Mayiladuthurai - Nedumaruthur road. The temple is accessible by the Mayiladuthurai - Kodandudi bus route.
