= Koranganatha Temple =

Koranganathar temple
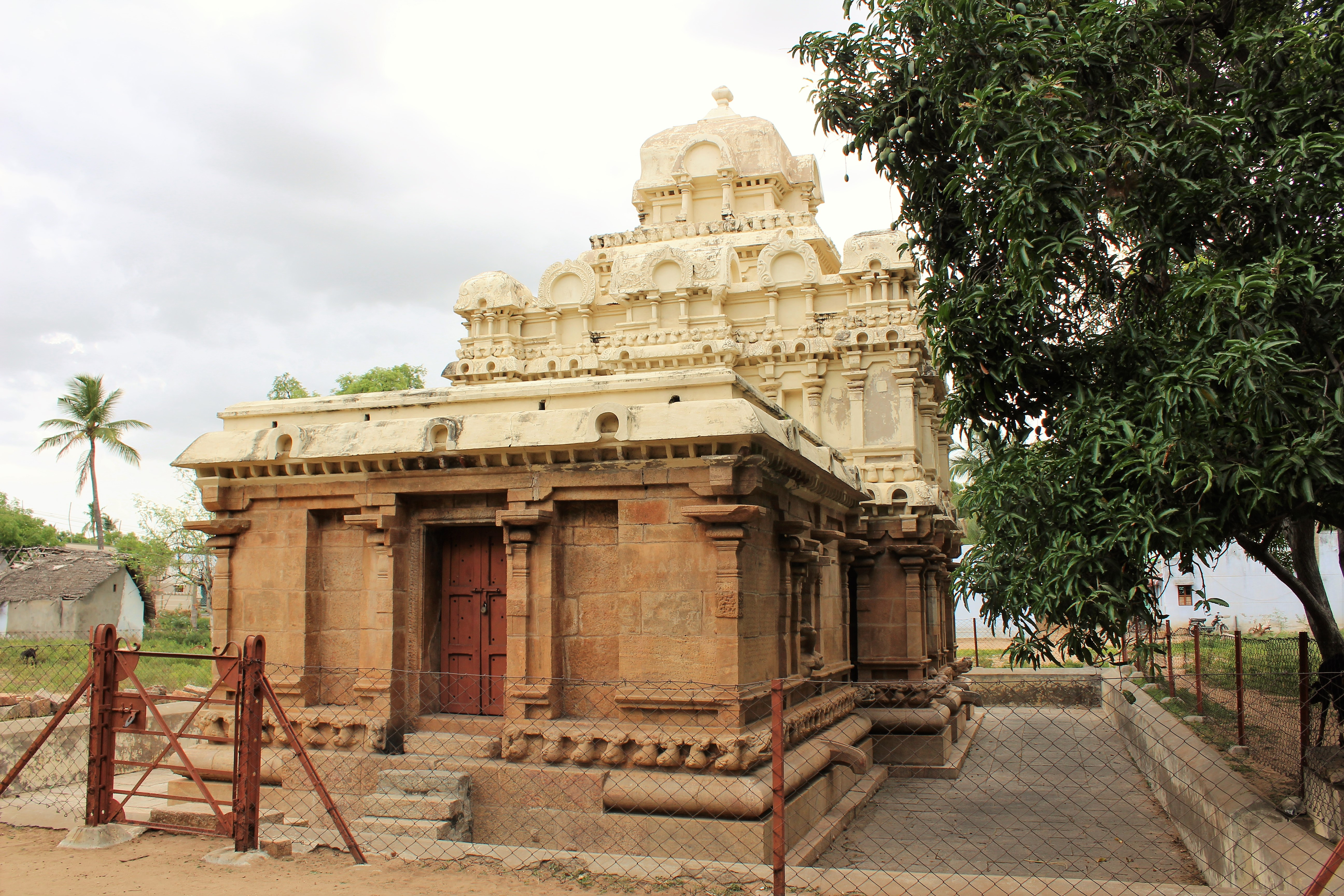

Religion
- Affiliation: Hinduism
- District: Tiruchirapalli

Location
- Location: Srinivasanallur
- State: Tamil Nadu
- Country: India
- Coordinates: 10.97°N 78.38°E

Koranganatha Temple is a Hindu temple situated in the town of Srinivasanallur, about 50 kilometres from Tiruchirappalli. This temple was managed, maintained and protected by peoples of Muthuraiyar / Muthuraja community who were feudatories of the Medieval Cholas. The temple was constructed by the Medieval Cholas and is dedicated to the god Ranganatha. The temple is protected by the Archaeological Survey of India (ASI).

== History ==
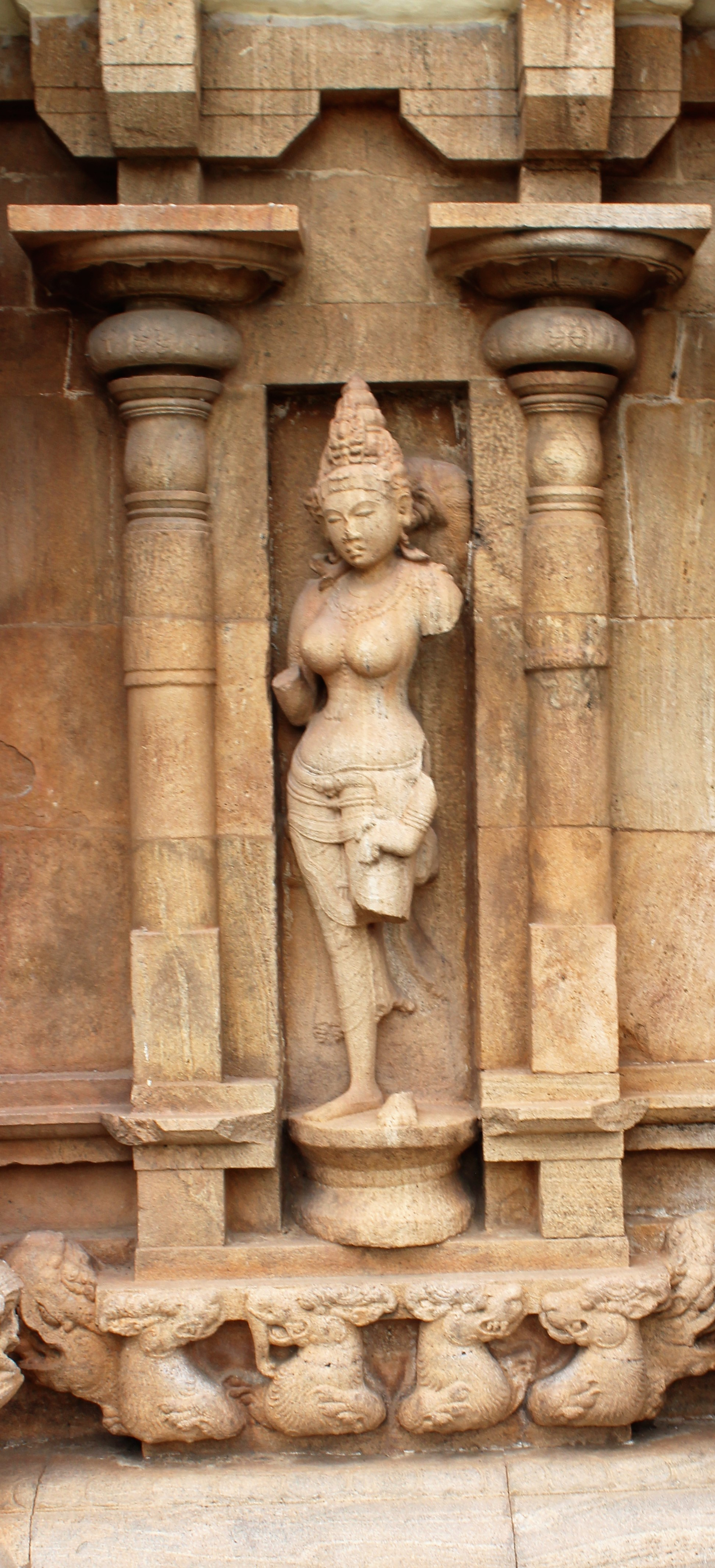
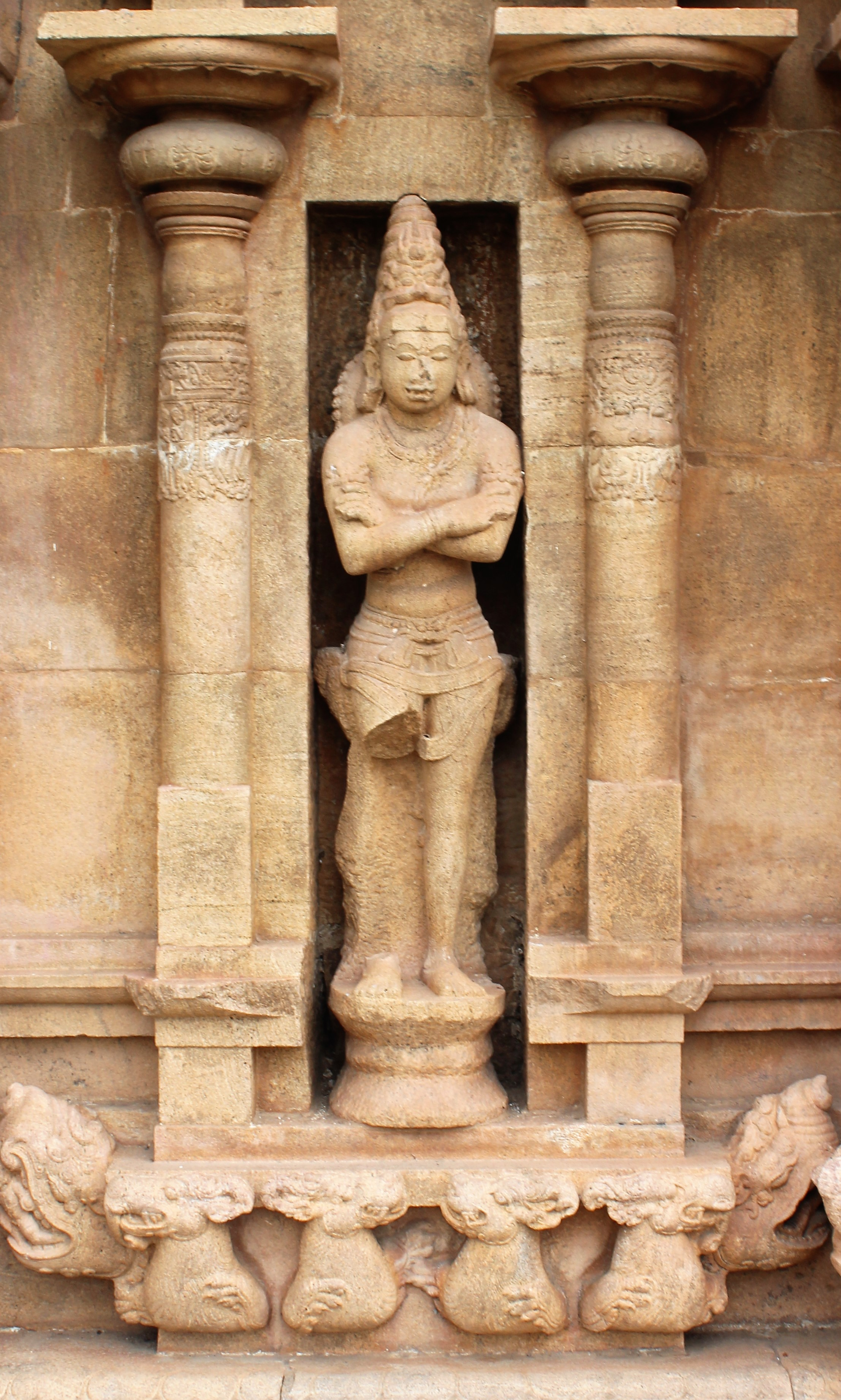
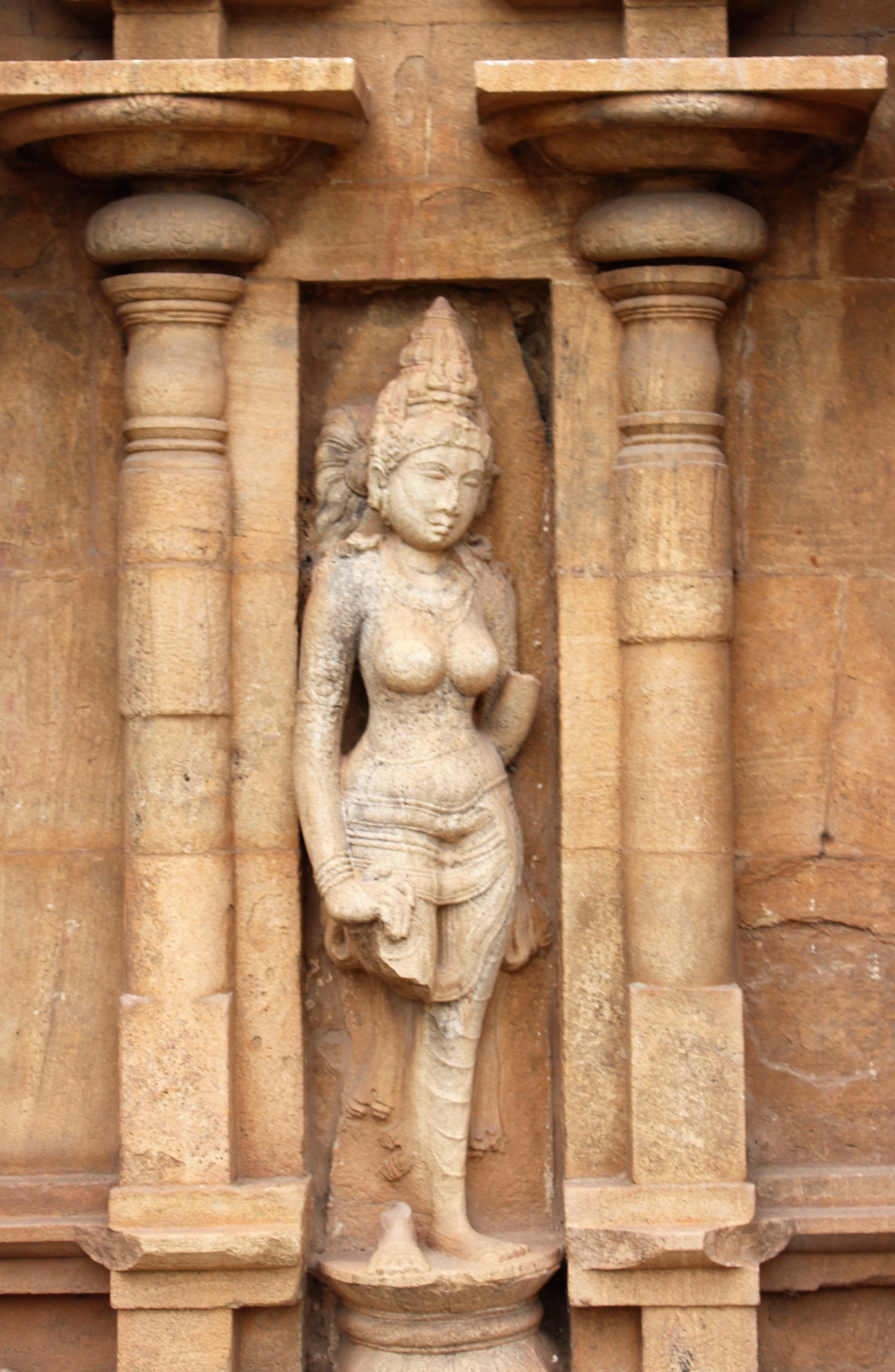
Images on the niches in the outer walls of the temple

According to historian Harle, the temple is counted among the four early extant temples of the Chola Empire, with the other three being Moovar Koil in Pudukottai district, Nageswaran temple at Kumbakonam and Brahmapureeswarar temple in Thanjavur district. These temples follow the Pallava architecture which are relatively small in size. They all have a fair-sized porch, locally called ardhamandapa attached to the sanctum, both of which are slightly below the ground level in a pit kind of structure. The structures are also predominantly built of stone. On the Southern wall of the temple, there is an inscription indicating a tax gree gift of 1.5 ma of garden for the perpetual lighting of the temple by Kachuvan Jatadeva Nilan of Thottiyam village.

== Architecture ==
Some historians believe that the temple is of Nagara style in the architecture of the vimana among its counterparts. According to Reddy, the temple is typical of Chola art is probably built by Parantaka I. The total cover length of the temple is 15.3 m (50 ft) and the shikara measures 15.3 m (50 ft). The sanctum is square in shape measuring 3.7 m (12 ft) and it has a small vestibule leading to a four pillared hall. The sculpted figures are heavily ornamented than any other temple figures during the period. Koranganatha temple is located in Srinivasanallur, a village located in the Trichy - Salem highway. The temple is dedicated to Hindu god Vishnu in the form of Ranganatha. The temple has a sanctum with a vimana over the sanctum and a four pillared hall. According to the temple records, the temple has multiple inscriptions from the Chola empire, none of which record or inform regarding origins and construction of the temple. There are multiple images of Dakshinamurthy, Bhikshatana, Vishnu and few other legends indicating the various Hindu legends.
