= Alanduraiyar Temple =

Shiva temple in Tamil Nadu, India

Coordinates: 11.042862°N 79.067952°E

Religion
- Affiliation: Hinduism
- District: Ariyalur District
- Deity: Lord Shiva

Location
- Location: Kilpaluvur in Ariyalur District
- State: Tamil Nadu
- Country: India
- Interactive map of Alanduraiyar Temple

Alanduraiyar Temple is a Hindu temple in the village of Kilpaluvur in Ariyalur District of Tamil Nadu, India.

== Speciality ==
Dedicated to the god Shiva, the temple dates to remote antiquity and is associated with the 7th-century saint Thirugnanasambandar. The temple is hims hymnsand is classified as Paadal Petra Sthalam.

It is believed that Parasurama worshipped here to get rid of the sin of killing his mother. The original brick temple was rebuilt in stone during the time of Parantaka Chola II and Uttama Chola.

== Photo gallery ==
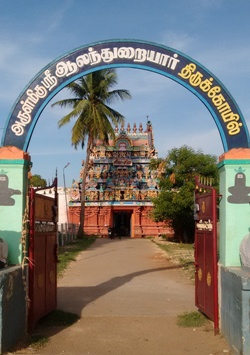

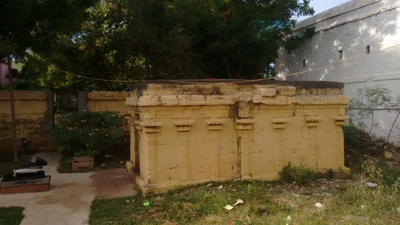

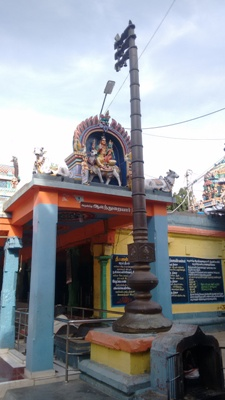

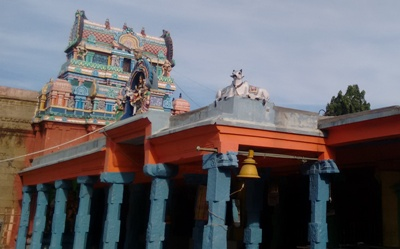

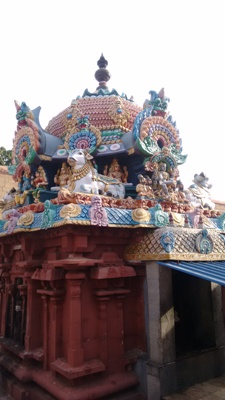

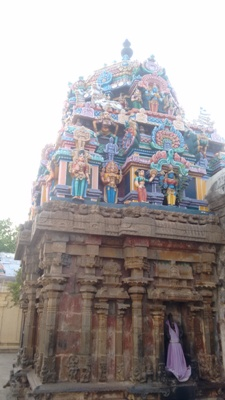

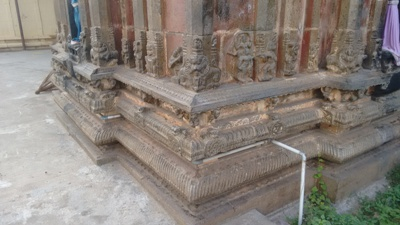
