= Pasupathikoil =

Neighbourhood in Thanjavur district, Tamil Nadu, India

- Village
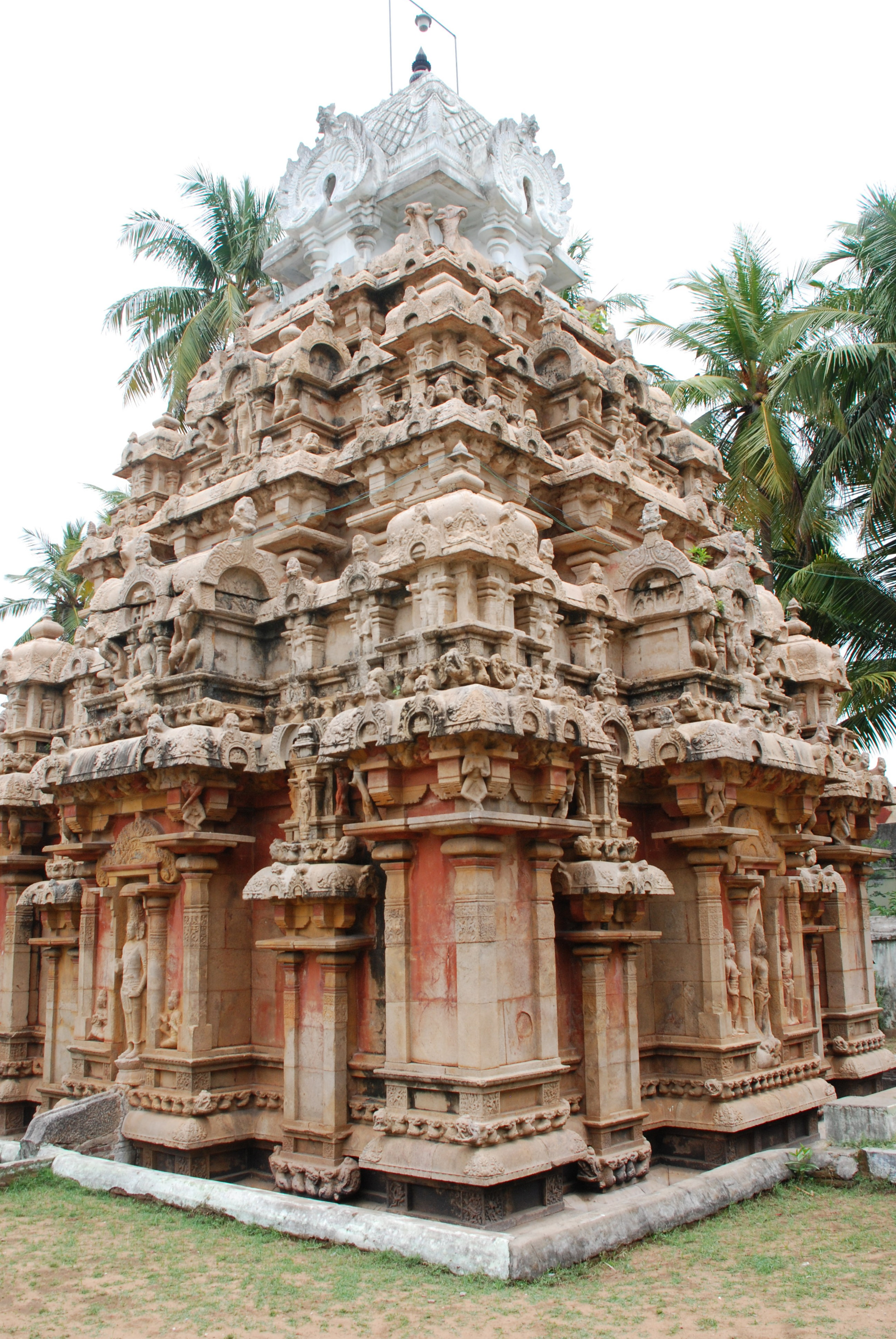
- Pullamangai Brahamapurisvarar Temple

- Pasupathikoil , Thanjavur district, Tamil Nadu
- Coordinates: 10.8876°N 79.1859°E
- Country: India
- State: Tamil Nadu
- District: Thanjavur
- Taluk: Papanasam

Population (2001)
  - Total: 7,431

Languages
  - Official: Tamil
- Time zone: UTC+5:30 (IST)
- Postal code: 614206

Pasupathikoil is a village in the Papanasam taluk of Thanjavur district, Tamil Nadu, India. It has an early chola temple of Brahmapurisvarar called Tirupullamangai.

== Demographics ==
As per the 2001 census, Pasupathikoil had a total population of 7431 with 3540 males and 3891 females. The sex ratio was 1099. The literacy rate was 75.29.

== Gallery ==
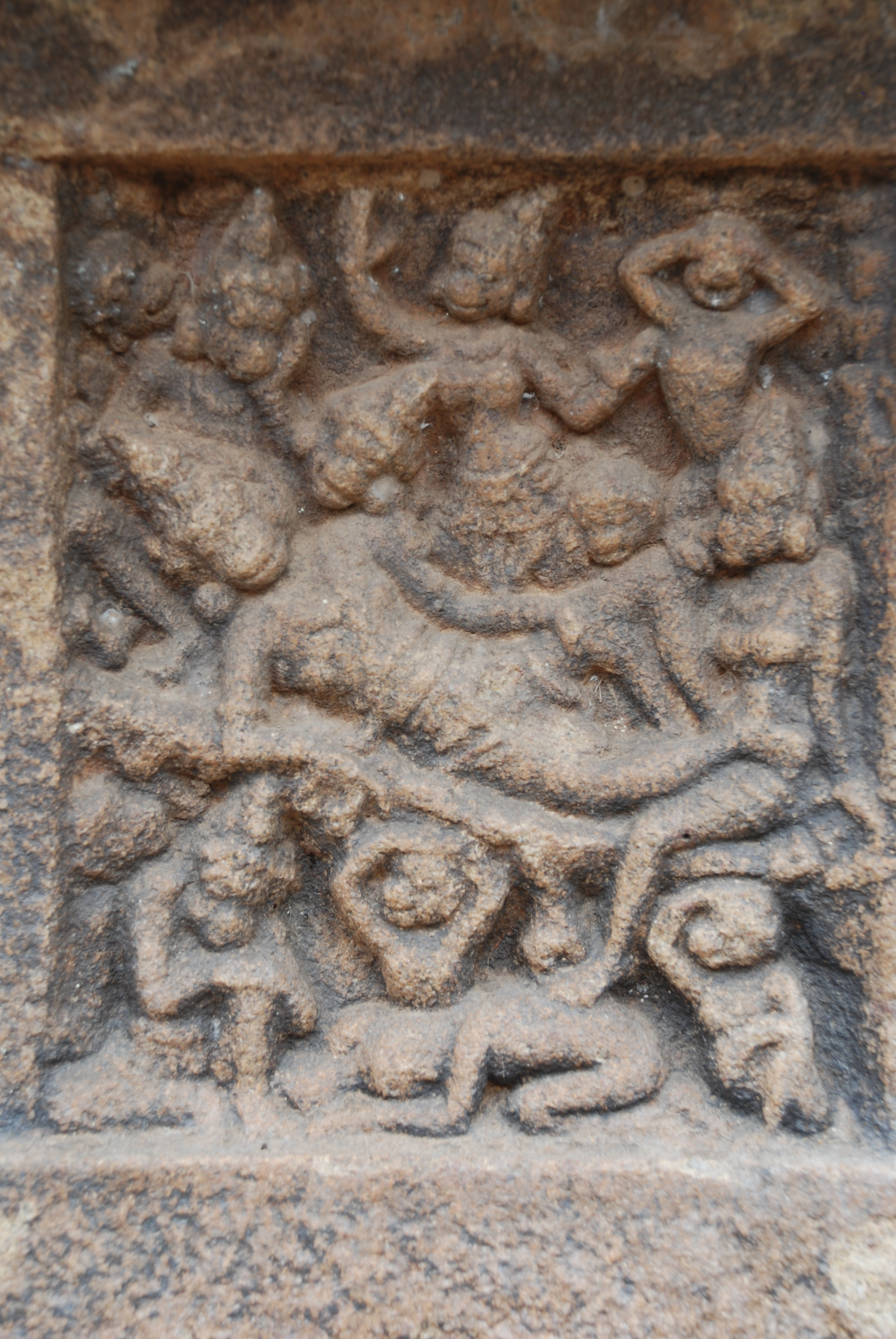
6 x 6 inches sculpture

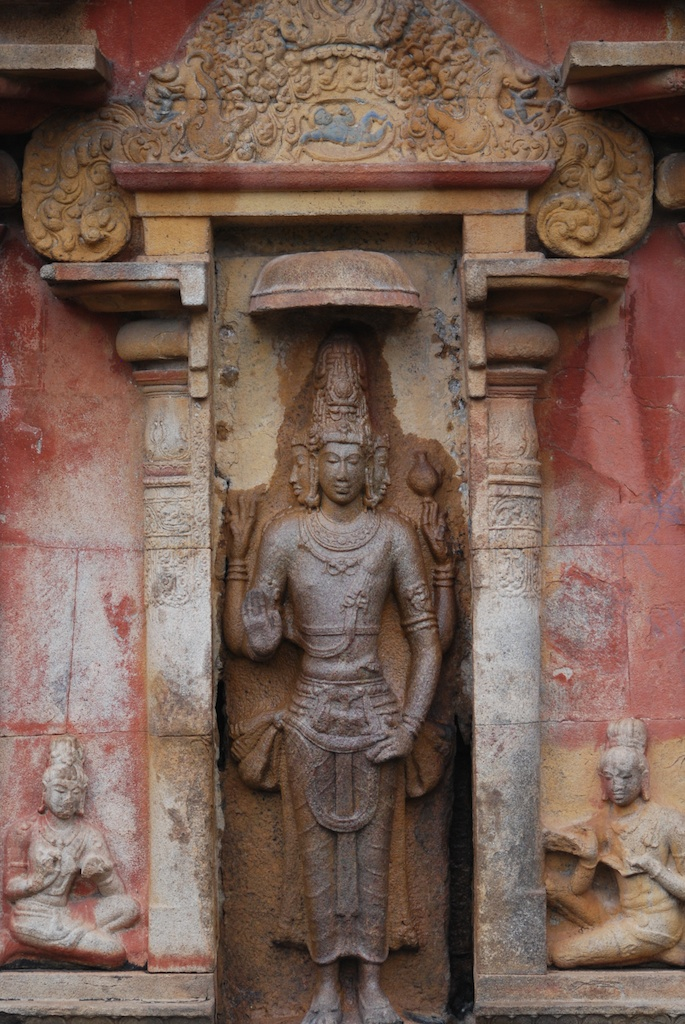
Brahma, Devakoshta image on the temple's north side
