= Matrikas =

Group of Hindu mother goddesses

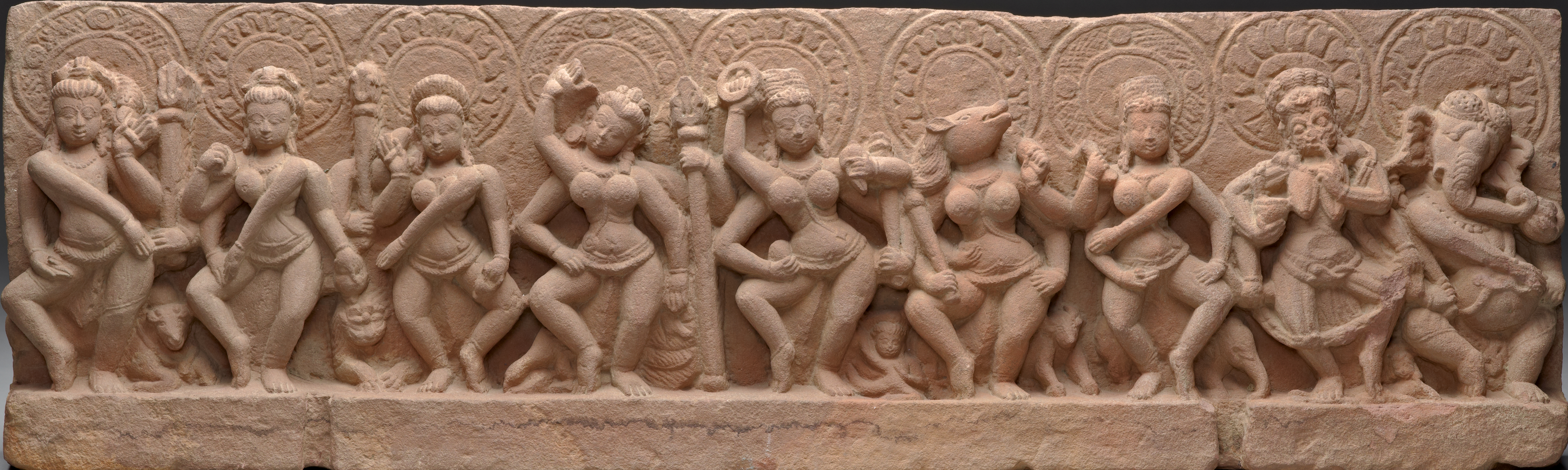
9th-century sculpture depicting the Seven Mother Goddesses (Matrikas) flanked by Shiva (left) and Ganesha (right)

Matrikas (Sanskrit: मातृका (singular), IAST: mātṛkā, lit. "mothers"), also called Mataras or Matri, are a group of mother goddesses in Hinduism. The Matrikas are often depicted in a group of seven, the Saptamatrika(s) (Seven Mothers). However, they are also depicted as a group of eight, the Ashtamatrika(s). They are associated with these gods as their energies (Shaktis). Brahmani emerged from Brahma, Vaishnavi from Vishnu, Maheshwari from Shiva, Indrani from Indra, Kaumari from Kartikeya, Varahi from Varaha, Narasimhi from Narasimha, and Chamunda from Chandi. Sometimes Vinayaki from Ganesha is also included.

Originally the seven goddesses of the seven stars of the star cluster of the Pleiades, they became quite popular by the seventh century CE and a standard feature of the Hindu goddesses's temples from the ninth century CE onwards. In South India, Saptamatrikas worship is prevalent whereas the Ashtamatrikas are venerated in Nepal, among other places.

The Matrikas assume paramount significance in the goddesses-oriented sect of Hinduism, Tantrism. In Shaktism, they are described as assisting the Durga in her fight with demons and demonesses and killing all of them. Other scholars say that they are Shaiva goddesses. They are also connected with the worship of warrior god Kartikeya. In most early references, the Matrikas are associated with the conception, birth, diseases, protection of children. They were seen as inauspicious, as the goddesses of perils, propitiated in order to avoid those ills, that killed off so many children before they reached adulthood. They come to play a protective role in later mythology, although some of their early inauspicious and wild characteristics continue in these legends. Thus, they represent the prodigiously fecund aspect of nature as well as its destructively killing aspect.

== Origins and development ==
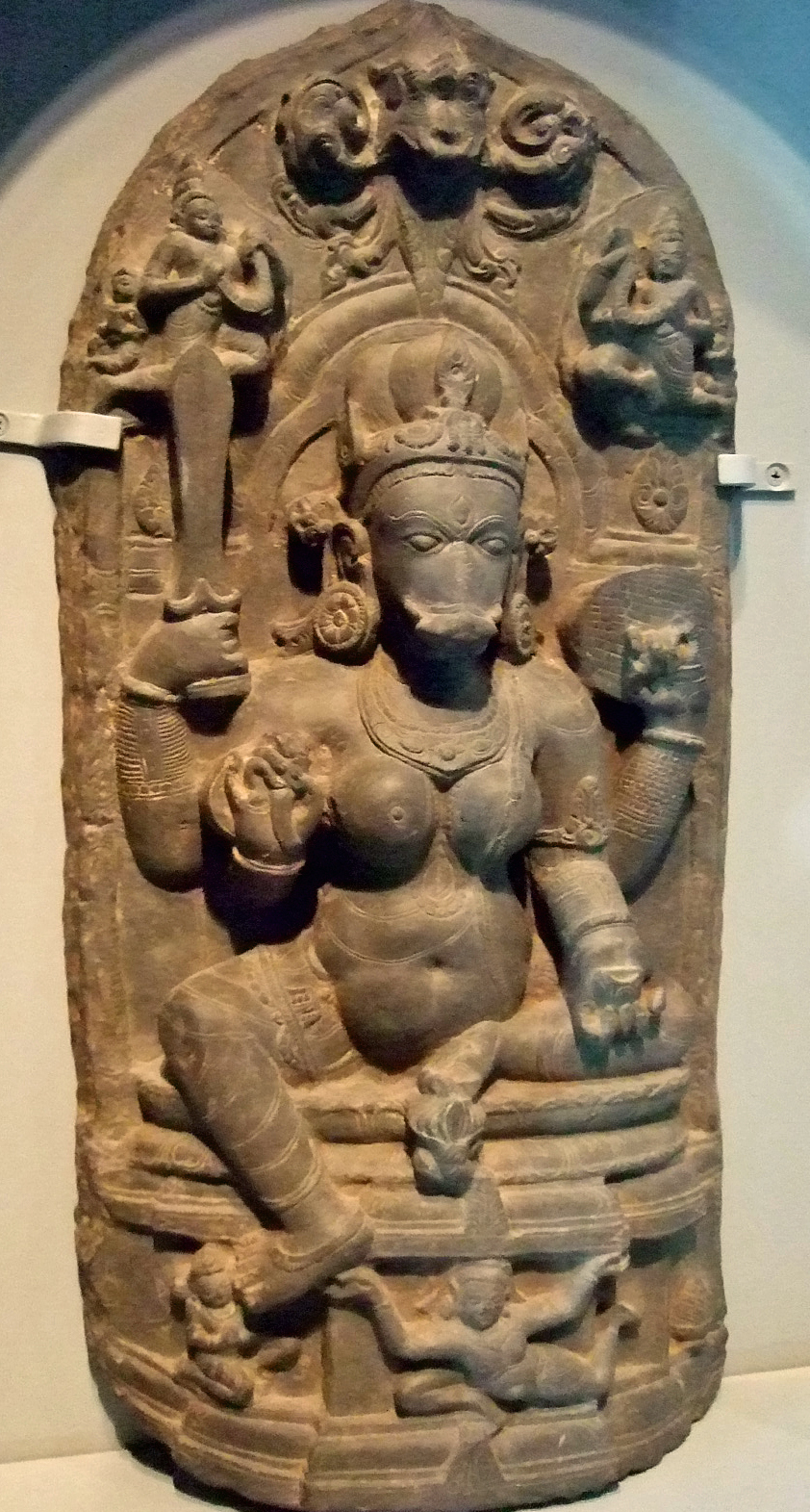
Varahi, one of the Matrikas

According to Jagdish Narain Tiwari and Dilip Chakravati, the Matrikas were existent as early as the Vedic period and the Indus Valley civilization. Seals with rows of seven feminine deities are cited as evidence for the theory. The Rigveda (IX 102.4) speaks of a group of seven Mothers who control the preparation of Soma, but the earliest clear description appears in select chapters of the epic Mahabharata dated to 1st century CE. Madhu Wangu believes that Matrika description in Mahabharata is rooted in the group of seven females depicted on Indus valley seals.

By the fifth century CE, all these goddesses were incorporated in mainstream orthodox Hinduism as Tantric deities. David Kinsley proposes that the Matrikas may be local village goddesses, who were being assimilated in the mainstream. He cites two reasons for his assertion: their description in Mahabharata as dark in colour, speaking foreign languages and living in peripheral areas and their association with god Skanda and his father and mother, Shiva and Parvati, whose forms were the Matrikas and Bhairavas had Vedic attributes. Sara L. Schastok suggests that the Matrikas maybe inspired by the concept of Yakshas, who are associated with Kartikeya and Kubera – both are often portrayed with the Matrikas. In contrast to the Indus Valley origins theory, Bhattacharyya notes:

The cult of the Female Principle was a major aspect of Dravidian religion, The concept of Shakti was an integral part of their religion. The cult of the Sapta Matrikas, or Seven Divine Mothers, which is an integral part of the Shakta religion, may be of Dravidian inspiration.

— Bhattacharyya, Bhattacharyya, Bhattacharyya

The Sapta-Matrikas were earlier connected with Kartikeya and in later times, associated with the Shaiva sect of Shiva himself. During the Kushana period (1st century CE to 3rd century CE), the sculptural images of the Matrikas first appear in stone. The Kushana images merged from the belief in Balagrahas (lit "destroyers of children") worship related to conception, birth, diseases, protection of children. The Balagraha tradition included the worship of the infant Kartikeya with the Matrikas. The goddesses were considered as personifications of perils, related to children and thus, were pacified by worship. The Kushana images emphasize the maternal as well as destructive characteristics of the Matrikas through their emblems and weapons. They appear to be an undifferentiated sculptural group but develop in standard and complex iconographic representation during the following Gupta period.

In the Gupta period (3rd century CE to 6th century CE), folk images of Matrikas became important in villages. The diverse folk goddesses of the soldiers like Matrikas were acknowledged by the Gupta rulers and their images were carved on royal monuments in order to strengthen the loyalty and adherence of their armed forces. The Gupta kings Skandagupta and Kumaragupta I (c. second half of the fifth century CE) made Kartikeya, who is also known as Skanda and Kumara (Note: The Gupta rulers took the names of the deity Skanda as their own names.) their model and elevated the position of Skanda's foster mothers, the Matrikas from a cluster of folk goddesses to court goddesses. Since the 4th century CE, Parhari, Madhya Pradesh had a rock-cut shrine been solely devoted to the Saptamatrikas.

The Western Ganga Dynasty (350 CE–1000 CE) kings of Karnataka built many Hindu temples along with Saptamatrikas carvings and memorials, containing sculptural details of Saptamatrikas. The evidence of Matrikas sculptures is further pronounced in the Gurjara–Patiharas (8th century CE to 10th century CE) and Chandella period (8th century CE to 12th century CE). The Chalukyas claimed to have been nursed by the Saptamatrikas. It was a popular practice to identify the links between South Indian royal family lineages to North Indian royal family lineages in ancient times through Matrikas nursing them all. During the Western Chalukya period (10th century CE to 12th century CE), all Matrikas continued to figure among the deities's sculptures of this period.

The Kadambas and Early Chalukyas from the fifth century CE, praise the Matrikas in their preambles, as givers of powers to defeat and kill their enemies. In most of the relevant texts, their exact number has not been specified, but gradually their number and names became increasingly crystallized and the seven mother goddesses were known as the seven Matrikas, albeit some mentions say that there are eight or sixteen Matrikas. Laura K. Amazzone cites:

The inconsistency in the number of Matrikas found in the Indus Valley today (seven, eight, nine) possibly reflects the localization of goddesses. Although the Matrikas are mostly grouped as seven goddesses over the rest of the Indian Subcontinent, an eighth Matrika has sometimes been added in Nepal to represent the eight cardinal directions. In Bhaktapur, a city in the Kathmandu Valley, a ninth Matrika is added to the set to represent the centre.

== Iconography ==
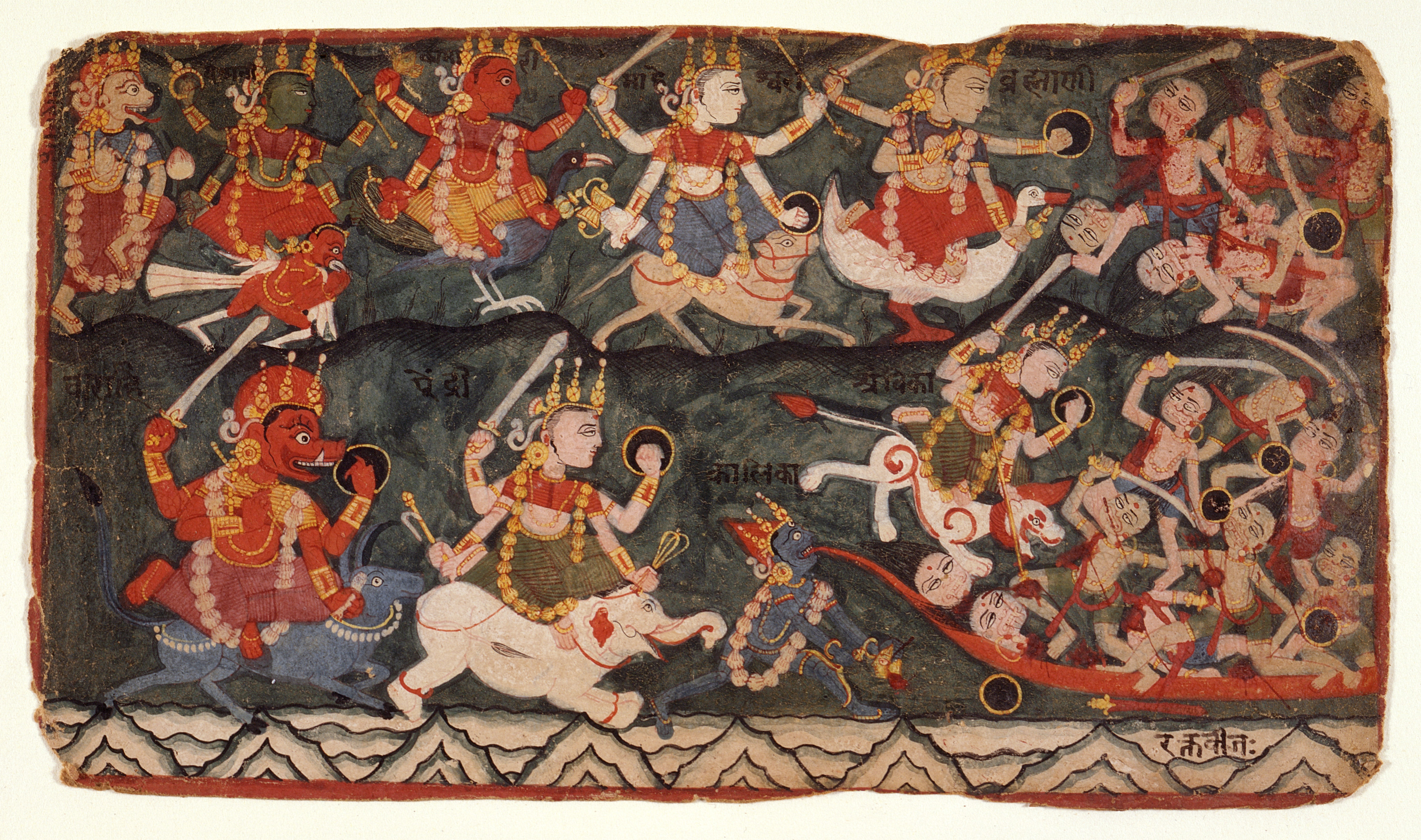
The eight Matrikas in battle (top row, from the left) Narasimhi, Vaishnavi, Kaumari, Maheshvari, Brahmani. (bottom row, from left) Varahi, Indrani, Chamunda with Kali before them, all fighting against and killing the asura Raktabīja. A folio from Devi Mahatmya.

The iconographical features of the Matrikas have been described in Hindu scriptures such as the Mahabharata, Puranas such as the Varaha Purana, Agni Purana, Matsya Purana, Vishnudharmottara Purana, Devi Mahatmya (part of the Markandeya Purana), Agamas such as the Amsumadbhedagama, Surabhedagama, Purvakarnagama, Rupamandana.

=== The Ashta-Matrikas as described in the Devi Mahatmya ===
1. Brahmani (Sanskrit: ब्रह्माणी, Brahmâṇī) or Brahmi (Sanskrit: ब्राह्मी, Brāhmī) is the Shakti (energy) of the creator god Brahma. She is depicted yellow in colour and with four heads. She may be depicted with four or six arms. Like Brahma, she holds a rosary, noose and kamandalu (water pot), lotus stalk, a book, bell and is seated on a hamsa (swan) as her vahana (mount or vehicle). She is also shown seated on a lotus with the hamsa on her banner. She wears various ornaments and is distinguished by her basket-shaped crown called karaṇḍa mukuṭa.
2. Narayani (Sanskrit: वैष्णवी, Vaiṣṇavī), the Shakti of the preserver god Narayana, is described as seated on the Garuda (eagle-man) and having four or six arms. She holds Shankha (conch), chakra (discus), mace and lotus and bow and sword or her two arms are in varada mudra (Blessing hand gesture) and abhaya mudra (No fear hand gesture). Like Vishnu, she is heavily adorned with ornaments like necklaces, anklets, earrings, bangles, etc and a cylindrical crown called kiriṭa mukuṭa.
3. Mahakali (Sanskrit: महाकाली, Māhakalī), also known as Maheshvari, the Shakti of the destroyer god Mahakala, also known as Maheshvara. Maheshvari is also known by the names Rudri, Rudrani, Maheshi, Shivani derived from Shiva's names Rudra, Mahesha, Shiva. Maheshvari is depicted seated on Nandi (the bull) and has four or six hands. The white complexioned, Trinetra (three eyed) goddess holds a Trishula (trident), Damaru (drum), Akshamala (A garland of beads), Panapatra (drinking vessel) or axe or an antelope or a kapala (skull-bowl) or a serpent and is adorned with serpent bracelets, the crescent moon and the jaṭā mukuṭa (A headdress formed of piled, matted hair).
4. Indrani (Sanskrit: इन्द्राणी, Indrāṇī), also known as Aindri, (Sanskrit: ऐन्द्री, Aindrī), Mahendri, Vajri, is the power of the Indra, the god of thunderstorms. Seated on an elephant, Indrani, is depicted dark-skinned, with two or four or six arms. She is depicted as having two or three or four eyes like Indra, and a thousand eyes on her body. She is armed with the Vajra (thunderbolt), goad, noose and lotus stalk. Adorned with variety of ornaments, she wears the kiriṭa mukuṭa.
5. Kaumari (Sanskrit: कौमारी, Kaumārī), also known as Kumari, Kartiki, Kartikeyani, Ambika is the power of Kartikeya, the god of war. Kaumari rides a peacock and has four or twelve arms. She holds a spear, axe, a Shakti (spear) or Tankas (coins) and a bow with arrows. She is six-headed like Kartikeya and wears a cylindrical crown called kiriṭa mukuṭa.
6. Varahi (Sanskrit: वाराही, Vārāhī), is also known as Vairali, Verai, Dandini, Dandai is the power of Varaha, the third and the boar-headed form of Vishnu. She holds a Danda (rod), plough, goad, a Vajra or a sword, and a Panapatra and she rides a buffalo. Sometimes, she carries a bell, chakra, chamara (a yak's tail) and a bow. She wears a crown called karaṇḍa mukuṭa with other ornaments.
7. Chamunda (Sanskrit: चामुण्डा, Cāṃuṇḍā), is also known as Chamundi and Charchika, is the power of Chandi, a form of Parvati. She is almost like Kali and is similar in her appearance and habit. The similarity with Kali is explicit in the Devi Mahatmya. The black coloured Chamunda is described as wearing a garland of severed heads (Mundamala) and holding a Damaru (drum), trishula (trident), sword and Panapatra (drinking-vessel) and wears a karaṇḍa mukuṭa. Riding a jackal, she is described as having three eyes, a terrifying face and a sunken belly.
8. Narasimhi (Sanskrit: नारसिंही, Nārasiṃhī) is the divine energy of Narasimha (the fourth and lion-man form of Vishnu). She is also called as Pratyangira, the woman-lion goddess who throws the stars into disarray by shaking her lion mane and wears a karaṇḍa mukuṭa. She is described as holding a Damaru (drum), trishula (trident), sword and Panapatra (drinking-vessel). She rides on a lion.

Though the first six are unanimously accepted by texts, the name and features of the seventh and eighth Matrikas are disputed. In the Devi Mahatmya, Chamunda is omitted after the Matrikas list, while in sculpture in shrines or caves and the Mahabharata, Narasimhi is omitted. The Varaha Purana names Yamuna – the shakti of Yama, as the seventh and Yogeshvari as the eighth Matrika, a form of Parvati emerged from flames coming from Shiva's mouth. In Nepal, the eighth Matrika is called Lakshmi also called as Sri is added omitting Narasimhi. In lists of nine Matrikas, Devi-Purana mentions Gananayika or Vinayaki – the shakti of Ganesha, characterized by her elephant head and ability to remove obstacles like Ganesha and Bhairavi omitting Narasimhi. The two Matrikas called as Kalyani and Kumari, who are the powers of Matsya and Kurma, the first and fish form and the second and sea turtle of Vishnu is also included sometimes in Central India. The Devi Bhagavata Purana mentions three other Matrikas, namely Varuni, the energy of Varuna, Kuberi, the energy of Kubera, Narayani, the energy of Narayana.

== Legends ==
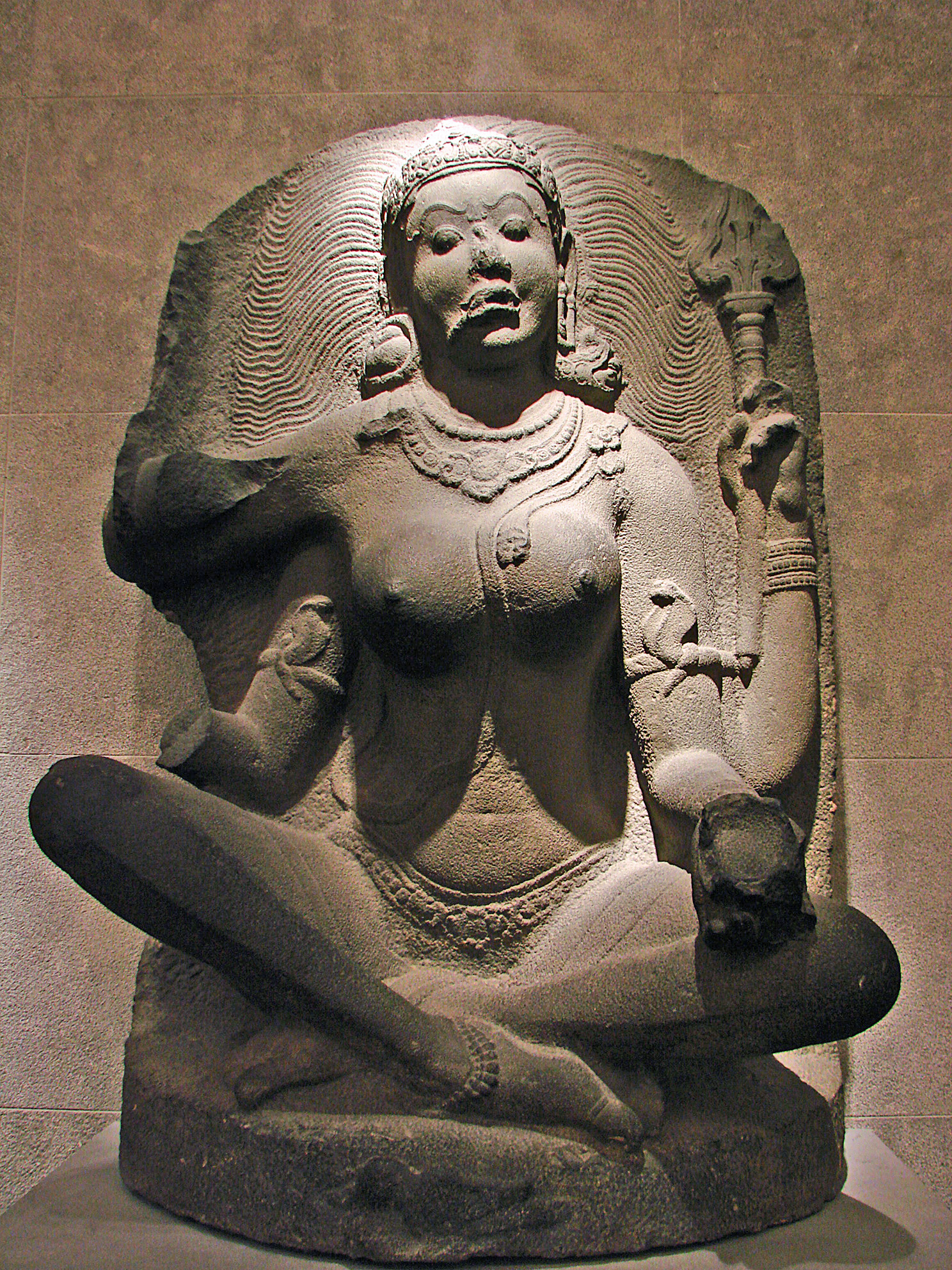
9th–10th century CE granite Chola statue of Matrika Maheshvari, seen with a trident in a hand, adorned by serpent ornaments and her vahana (mount), the bull Nandi is seen on her seat — Guimet Museum, Paris, France.

There are several Puranic texts related to the origin of Matrikas. Matsya Purana, Vamana Purana, Varaha Purana, Kurma Purana and the Suprabhedagama contain references to Matrikas, and this asserts their antiquity.

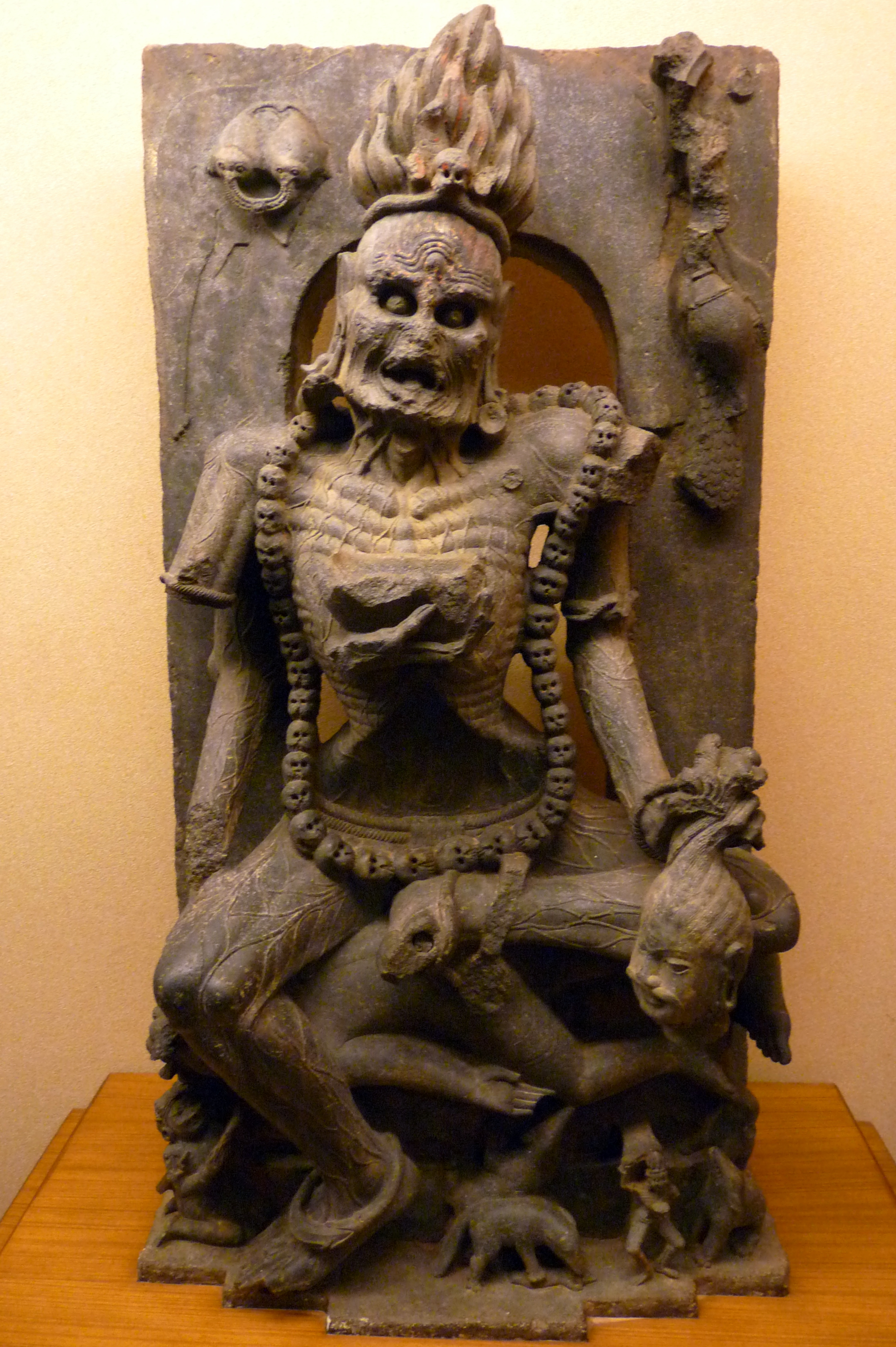
Chamunda, Orissa State Museum

According to the Shumbha and Nishumbha story of Devi Mahatmya, Matrikas appear as Shaktis from the bodies of the gods and goddesses – Brahma, Shiva, Skanda, Vishnu, Indra, Vishnu as Varaha, Vishnu as Narasimha, Parvati as Chandi; having the form of each, approached Devi with whatever form, ornaments, vehicles the god or goddess possessed. In that form, they slaughter the demon and demoness army completely that none remains. Thus, the Matrikas are goddesses of the battlefield. They are described as assistants of Durga having sinister as well as propitious characteristics. After the battle, the Matrikas dance drunk with their victims's blood. This description is repeated with little variation in Devi Bhagavata Purana and Vamana Purana. The Devi Bhagavata Purana mentions three other goddesses, Shaktis of other gods in addition to the Saptamatrikas, making a group of 10 Matrikas.

According to latter episode of Devi Mahatmya, Durga created Matrikas from herself and with their help, slaughtered the entire demon and demoness army completely. In this version, Kali is described as a Matrika, who sucked all the blood of the demon Raktabīja and killed him completely there on. Kali is given the name Chamunda in the text. When demons Shumbha and Nishumbha challenge Durga to a single combat, she absorbs the Matrikas in herself and says that they are her different forms and kills both of them single handedly there. In the Vamana Purana too, the Matrikas arise from different parts of Durga and not from the male gods, although they are described and named after the male gods.

In Matsya Purana, Shiva had created seven Matrikas to combat the demon Andhaka, who had the ability to duplicate from each drop of his blood that falls from him when he is wounded. (Note: This very ability is possessed by Raktabija of the Devi-mahatmya and Vamana Purana.) The Matrikas drink up his blood and help Shiva defeat the demon. After the battle, the Matrikas begin a rampage of destruction by starting to devour other gods, demons and peoples of the world. Narasimha, Vishnu's man-lion incarnation, creates a host of thirty-two benign goddesses who calm down the terrible, fire-breathing Matrikas. Narasimha commanded the Matrikas to protect the world, instead of destroying it and thus be worshipped by mankind. At the end of the episode, Shiva's terrible form Bhairava is enshrined with the images of the Matrikas at the place where the battle took place. This story is retold in Vishnudharmottara Purana. Vishnudharmottara Purana further relates them with vices or inauspicious emotions like envy, pride, anger etc.

In Varaha Purana, they are created from the distracted mind of goddess Vaishnavi, who loses her concentration while doing asceticism. They are described as lovely and act as the goddesses' attendants on the battlefield. In the Bhagavata Purana, when beings created by Vishnu are enlisted; the Matrikas are listed with rakshasas (demons), bhutas (ghosts), pretas, dakinis and other dangerous beings. In the same text, milkmaids offer a prayer for protection of the infant-god Krishna from the Matrikas.

The Devi Purana (6th – 10th century) mentions a group of sixteen Matrikas and six other types of Matrikas mentioned, apart from the Saptamatrikas. It introduces the Loka-matara (mothers of the world), a term used in the Mahabharata, in the first chapter. Kind to all creatures, the Matrikas are said to reside in various places for the benefit of children. The text paradoxically describes the Matrikas as being created by various gods like Brahma, Vishnu, Shiva, Indra as well as being their mothers. Devi Purana describe a pentad of Matrikas, who help Ganesha to kill demons. Further, sage Mandavya is described as worshipping the Māṭrpaňcaka (the five mothers) named Kaumari, Maheshvari, Chamunda, Brahmi, Vaishnavi and who have been established by Brahma; for saving king Harishchandra from calamities. The Matrikas direct the sage to perform worship of Māṭrchakra (interpreted as a Yantra or Mandala or a circular shrine to the Matrikas), established by Vishnu on the Vindhya mountains, by meat and ritual sacrifice.

=== Mahabharata ===
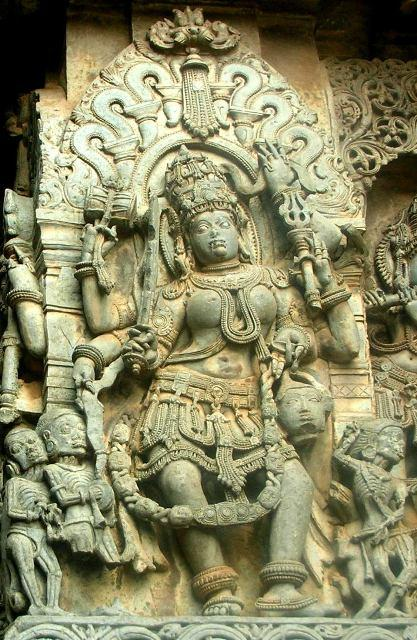
A Hoysala sculpture of Chamunda, Halebidu. Surrounded by skeletons, the goddess has large nails and protruding teeth and wears a garland of skulls.

The Mahabharata narrates in different chapters the birth of warrior-god Kartikeya (the son of Shiva and Parvati) and his association with the Matrikas – his adopted mothers.

In one version, Indra (king of gods) sends the goddesses called "mothers of the world" to kill him. However, upon seeing Skanda, instead they follow their maternal instincts and raise him. In the chapter Vana Parva version, the Saptamatrikas are mentioned. Later in the Mahabharata; when absorption of these indigenous goddesses in the Hindu pantheon was initiated, a standardized group of seven goddesses – the Saptamatrikas, Shaktis or powers of Hindu gods are mentioned as Brahmi, Maheshvari, Kaumari, Vaishnavi, Varahi, Indrani, Chamunda.

In other accounts of Skanda's birth in Mahabharata, eight ferocious goddesses emerge from Skanda, when struck by Indra's Vajra (thunderbolt). These are Kāki, Halimā, Mālinī, Bṛhalī, Āryā, Palālā, Vaimitrā, which Skanda accepted as his mothers, who stole other children – a characteristic of the Matrikas.

Another account mentions the Maha-matrikas (the great mothers), a group of the wives of six of the Saptarshi (seven great sages), who were accused of being Skanda's real mothers and thus abandoned by their husbands. They request Skanda to adopt them as his mothers. Skanda agrees and grants them two boons: to be worshipped as great goddesses and permission to torment children as long as they are younger than 16 years and then act as their protectors. These six goddesses as well as the Saptamatrikas are identified with Vedic Krttika, the constellation Pleiades.

The Shalya Parva of the Mahabharata mentions characteristics of a host of Matrikas, who serve Skanda. Ninety-two of them are named but the text says there exist more. The Shalya Parva describes them as young, cheerful, most of them fair but having dangerous features like long nails and large teeth. They are said to fight like Indra in battles, invoking terror in minds of enemies; speak different foreign tongues and lives in inaccessible places away from human settlements like crossroads, caves, mountains, springs, forests, riverbanks and cremation grounds. Notable among these lists of Matrikas is Putana, a goddess who tried to kill the infant Krishna (an incarnation of Vishnu) by suckling him with poisoned breast milk and was consequently killed by Krishna.

=== Other ===
In the Brihat Samhita, Varahamihira says that "Matrikas are forms of Parvati taken by her with cognizance of (different major Hindu) gods corresponding to their names."

== Depictions ==
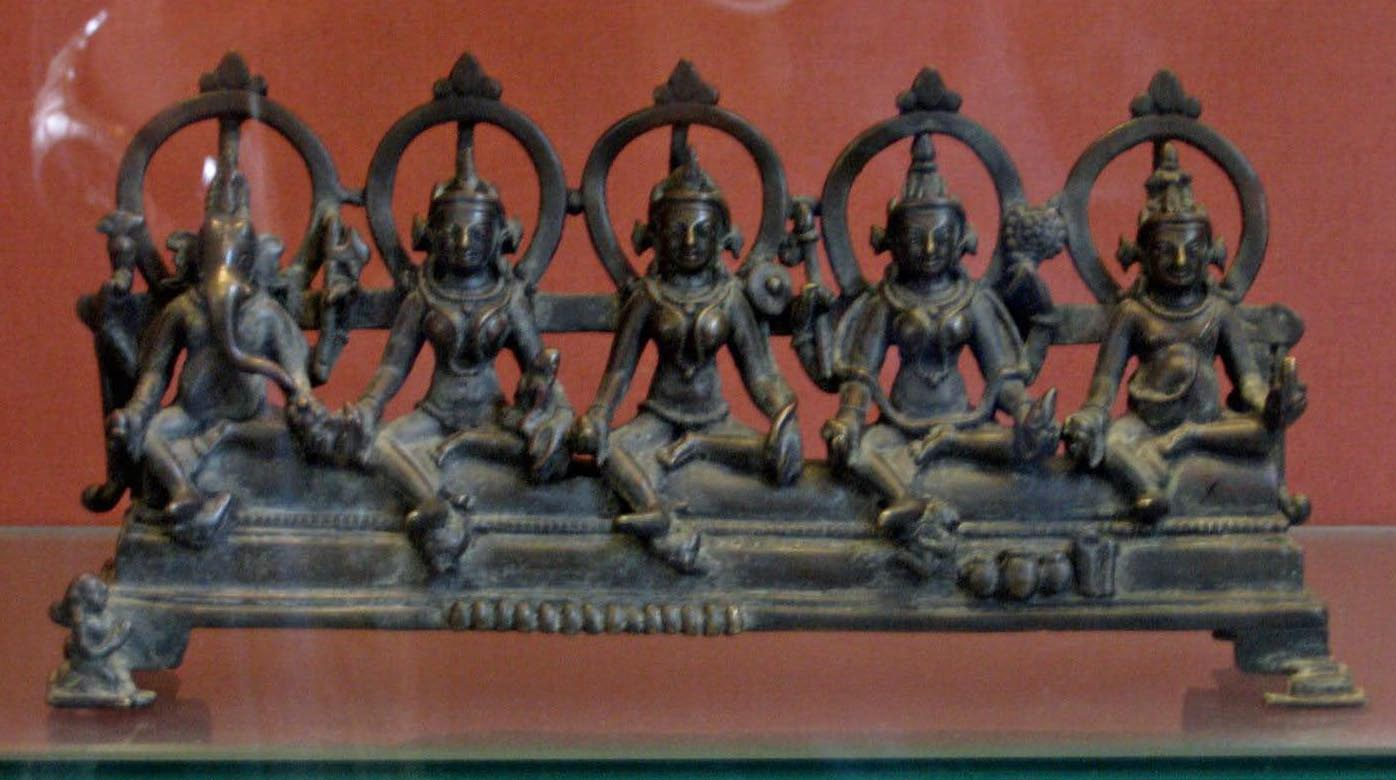
Bronze group with (from left) Ganesha; Brahmani, Kaumari, Vaishnavi, – the 3 Matrikas, Kubera taken at the British Museum; originally from Eastern India, dedicated in 43rd year of reign of Pala king Mahipala I (about AD 1043)

The textual description of Matrikas is generally frightening and ferocious. In the Mahabharata, all the seven mothers are described as fatal or serve as threats to foetuses or infants. They are described as living in trees, crossroads, caves and funeral grounds and they are terrible as well as beautiful. But, in the sculptural portrayal, they are depicted quite differently as protectors and benevolent mothers. They are armed with the same weapons, wear the same ornaments, and ride the same vahanas and carry the same banners as their corresponding male deities.

The Saptamatrikas are generally carved in relief on a rectangular stone slab in the sequential order of Brahmani, Maheshvari, Kaumari, Vaishnavi, Varahi, Indrani, Chamunda, being flanked by two male figures – Shiva and his son with Parvati, Ganesha in both sides (first – on their right and last – on their left). Thus, the Matrikas are considered Shaivite goddesses. They are often depicted on the lintel slabs of the main door of a Shiva and Parvati temple – mainly in the Jaunsar-Bawar region, with their respective mounts forming the pedestal. Sometimes, they are occupied by the couple Uma-Maheshvara (Parvati and Shiva). The earliest instance of their portrayal with Uma-Maheshvara is at Desha Bhattarika, Nepal although now the Matrika images have withered away. The 12th century Sanskrit author Kalhana mentions worship of Matrikas with Shiva and Parvati in Kashmir, his work Rajatarangini.

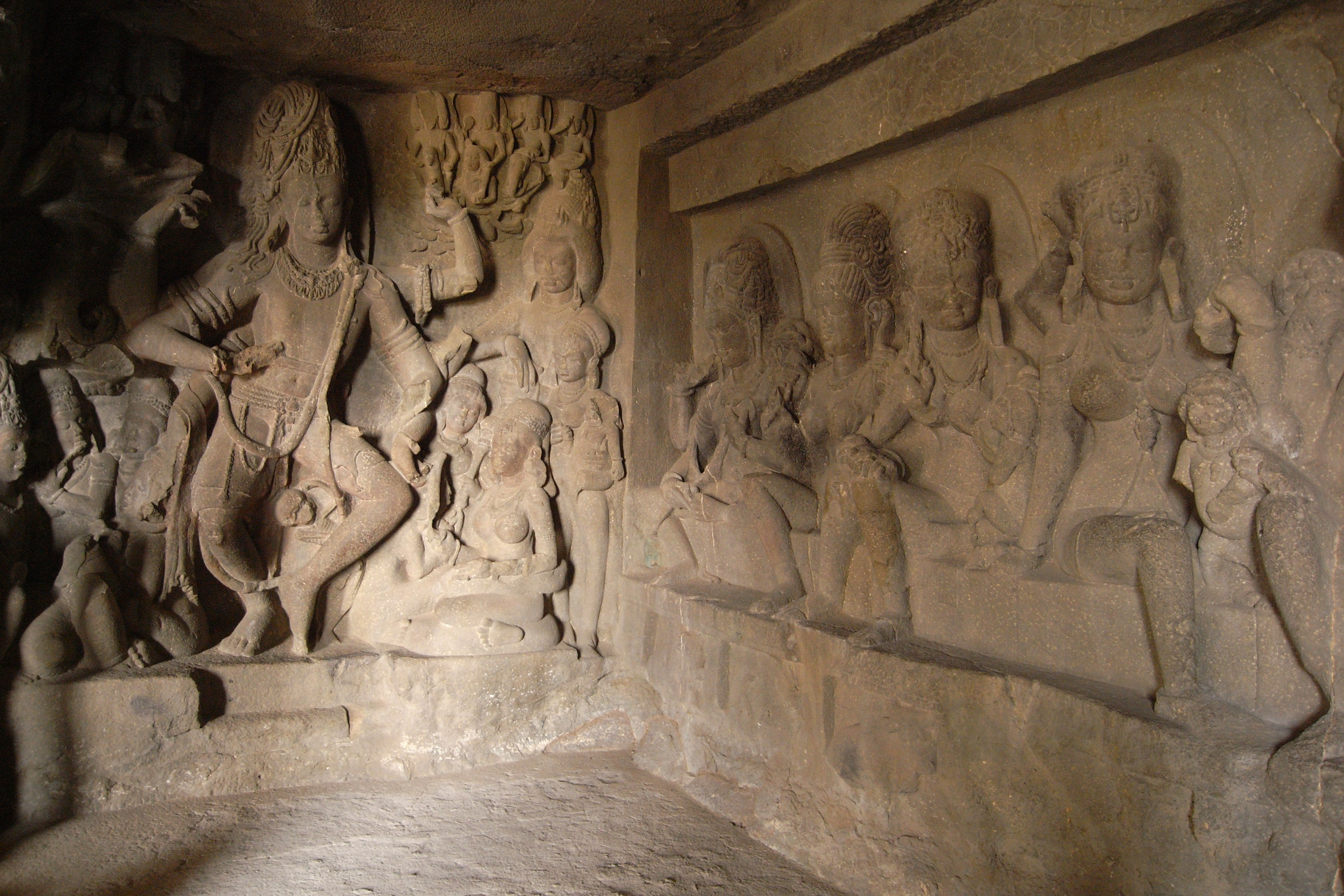
Nataraja–Shiva (left) with Virabhadra and the first three Matrikas. Matrikas are depicted with children. Ellora.

Three panels of Saptamatrikas appear near the Shiva and Parvati cave at Udayagiri, Bhopal. They are also depicted in the Shaiva caves of Elephanta and Ellora (Caves 21, 14, 16 and 22). In sixth century Rameshvara cave (Cave 21) at Ellora, "With the terrific aspect repressed entirely, the Matrikas are depicted as benign and are worshipped in adulation. Sensuous, elegant, tender, beautiful adolescents, they are yet haughty and grand, quintessentially the creatrix." Kaumari is depicted with a child on her lap and even Varahi is depicted with a human head, rather than the usual boar one. In the Ravanakakai cave (Cave 14), each of the Matrikas is with a child. In eighth century Kailasha Temple (cave 16) – dedicated to Shiva and Parvati – of Rashtrakuta period, the Matrikas appear on the southern boundary of the temple. As the influence of the Tantras rose, the fertility area and upper parts of body in the Matrika sculptures were stressed.

In each of the four depictions at Ellora, the Matrikas are accompanied by Shiva, Ganesha and also on their left (besides Ganesha) by Yama (the god of death). The presence of Yama in form of a skeleton, seems to indicate the darker aspect of the matrikas' nature. At Osian, the Matrikas is flanked by Ganesha and Kubera (the treasurer of the gods and a companion of Shiva and Parvati) while Shiva sits in the middle of the group. In Gupta and post-Gupta art, like in 6th Century caves of Shamalaji, the Matrikas are accompanied by Shiva and Parvati's son Skanda.

== Associations ==
=== Yoginis ===
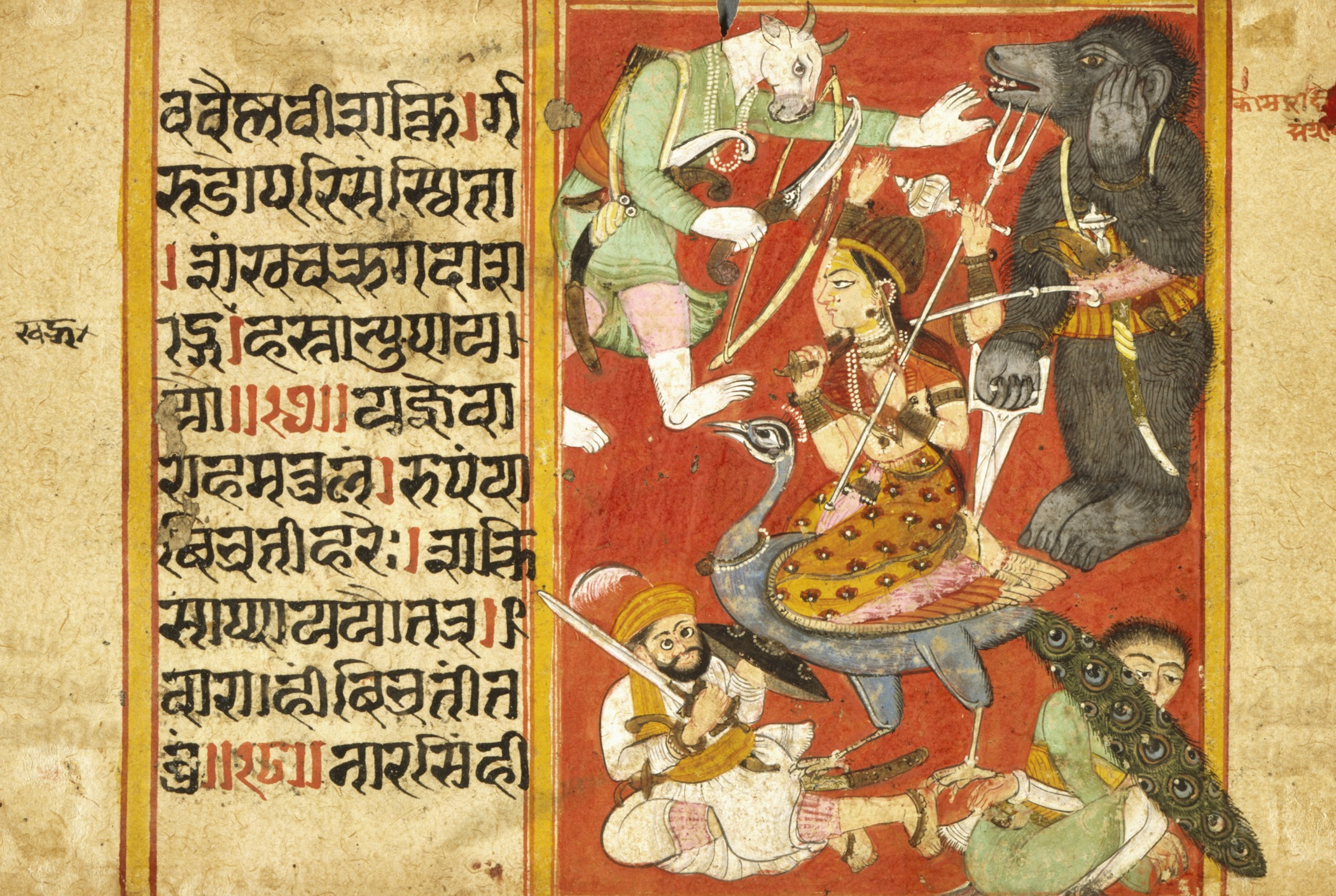
Kaumari, a folio from the Devi Mahatmya

The Matrikas are included among the Yoginis, a group of sixty-four or eighty-one Tantric goddesses, in a tradition which treats the Yoginis as important deities, whereas another tradition, which views the Yoginis as cruel minor deities, considers them separate entities. In Sanskrit literature the Yoginis have been represented as the attendants or various manifestations of goddess Durga engaged in fighting with the demons Shumbha and Nishumbha, and the principal Yoginis are identified with the Matrikas. Other Yoginis are described as born from one or more Matrikas. The derivation of sixty-four Yoginis from eight Matrikas became a common tradition, by mid- 11th century. The Mandala (circle) and chakra of Yoginis were used alternatively. The eighty-one Yoginis evolve from a group of nine Matrikas, instead of seven or eight. The Saptamatrika (Brahmani, Maheshvari, Kaumari, Vaishnavi, Varahi, Indrani, Chamunda) joined by Chandi and Mahalakshmi form the nine Matrikas cluster. Each Matrika is considered to be a Yogini and is associated with eight other Yoginis resulting in the troupe of eighty-one (nine times nine); there is an 81-Yogini temple at Bhedaghat in Madhya Pradesh. Thus, Yoginis are considered as manifestations or daughters of the Matrikas.

The yoginis also occupy an important place in Tantra, with 64-Yogini temples across India including the well-preserved ones at Ranipur-Jharial and Hirapur in Odisha. The rise of the Yogini cult is analogous to the rise of the Matrikas's cult. Bhattacharyya sums it this way: "The growing importance of Shaktism (of the matrikas and yoginis in the first millennium CE) brought them into greater prominence and distributed their cult far and wide. The primitive Yogini cult was also revived on account of the increasing influences of the cult of the Seven Mothers."

=== Script characters ===
Matrika (Sanskrit mātṛkā) is also a term used to denote features of Indic scripts (also in combination with akshara, matrikaksara), though there is considerable variation in the precise interpretation of the term from one author to another. Sometimes it denotes a single character, the entire collection of characters (an "alphabet"), the alphabetic "matrix" used as a collation tool, vowels in particular (considered erroneous by Georg Bühler), or the sound of the syllable represented by the character. Various traditions identify the script matrikas with the sacred divine Matrikas.

According to K.C. Aryan, the number of Matrikas is determined in the structure of the Devanagari alphabet. First is the (A) group which contains the vowels, then the (Ka), (Cha), (Ta), (ta), (Pa), (Ya) and (Ksha) groups. The seven mother goddesses (Saptamatrikas) correspond to the seven consonant groups; when the vocalic (A) group is added to it, the eight mother goddesses (Ashtamatrikas) are obtained. The Shaktas hold that the Mothers preside over impurities (mala) and over sounds of the language. The Mothers were identified with fourteen vowels plus the anusarva and visarga, making their number sixteen.

In Tantra, the fifty or fifty-one letters including vowels as well as consonants from A to Ksha, of the Devanagari alphabet itself, the Varnamala of bija, have been described as being the Matrikas themselves. It is believed that they are infused with the power of the Divine Mother herself. The Matrikas are considered to be the subtle form of the letters (varna). These letters combined make up syllables (pada) which are combined to make sentences (vakya) and it is of these elements that mantra is composed. It is believed that the power of mantra derives from the fact that the letters of the alphabet are in fact forms of the goddess. The 50 Matrika Kalas are given in the same account as follows: Nivritti, Pratishtha, Vidya, Shanti, Indhika, Dipika, Mochika, Para, Sukshma, Sukshmamrita, Jnanamrita, Apypayani, Vyapini, Vyomarupa, Ananta, Srishti, Riddhi, Smriti, Medha, Kanti, Lakshmi, Dyuti, Sthira, Sthiti, Siddhi, Jada, Palini, Shanti, Aishvarya, Rati, Kamika, Varada, Ahladini, Pritih, Dirgha, Tikshna, Raudri, Bhaya, Nidra, Tandra, Kshudha, Krodhini, Kriya, Utkari, Mrityurupa, Pita, Shveta, Asita, Ananta. Sometimes, the Matrikas represent a diagram written in the letter, believed to possess magical powers.

== Worship ==
=== In India ===
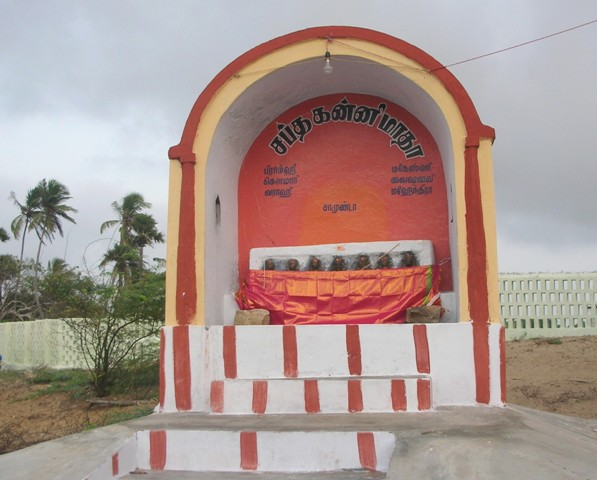
A shrine of the seven mothers in Ramanathapuram District, Tamil Nadu

According to Leslie C. Orr, the Saptamatrikas, who first appeared in South India in the eighth century CE, had once temples dedicated exclusively to them, but since the ninth century CE onwards, they were demoted to status of "deities of the entourage" (parivara devata) of Shiva and Parvati. Their images moved from the sanctums to corners of temple complexes and now they are as guardian deities in small village shrines. The Saptamatrikas are worshipped as Saptakanyas (the seven virgins) in most South Indian Shiva and Parvati temples especially in Tamil Nadu. But the Selliyamman temple at Alambakkam in Tiruchirapalli district is important in worship of the Matrikas. Here once stood a temple dedicated to the Saptamatrikas, which was replaced by the present temple where that are still worshipped by everyone now.

In India, shrines of the Saptamatrikas are located in "the wilderness", usually near lakes or rivers, and are made of seven vermilion smeared stones. It is believed that the Matrikas kill fetuses and newborns unless pacified with bridal finery and prayers by women. A prominent Saptamatrika temple is located near Baitarani River, in Jajpur.

The Saptamatrika images are worshipped by women on Pithori – new moon day, with the 64 yoginis represented by rice flour images or supari nuts. The goddesses are worshipped by ceremonial offerings of fruits and flowers and mantras.

=== In Nepal ===
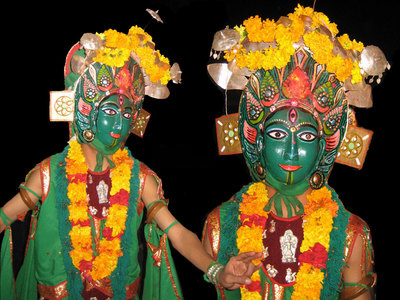

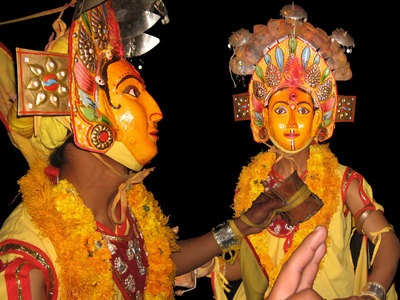
Vaishnavi or Bishnuvi (top) and Brahmi or Brahmayani (bottom) in the Bhairab Naach

The Matrikas function both as city protectors and individual protectors in both Hinduism and Buddhism. The Astha Matrikas are considered as Ajimas (grandmother goddesses, who are feared as bringer of disease and misfortune as well act as protectresses) in the Newar pantheon. Temples (pithas i.e., seats) of the ashta matrika built in and around Kathmandu are considered powerful places of worship.

The pithas are usually open-air shrines, but may be closed structures too. In these pithas, the Matrikas are worshipped with their followers (ganas) in form of stone statues or natural stones, while in dyochems (god-houses) in towns and villages, they are represented in brass images. The brass images (utsav-murtis) are paraded around town and placed at their respective pithas once every year. Like Vishnudharmottara Purana (discussed in Legends), the Matrikas are considered as representing a vice and are worshipped by pithapuja (a pilgrimage around the pithas) to free oneself from them. Though each pitha is primarily dedicated to a Matrika, the other Matrikas are also worshipped as subordinate deities. The pithas, which are "theoretically located at the outer boundaries of the city" are said to form a protective mandala around the city and assisted to a certain compass point. In other temples like the ones dedicated to Pacali Bhairava, the Asthamatrikas are worshipped as a circle of stones. In Bhaktapur, the Ashtamatrikas are believed to the preserver goddesses of the city guarding the eight geometrical directions. Mary Sluser says "Not only do the Mātṛkās guard the compass points but they are also regarded as regents of the sky." Sometimes, they are paired with the Ashta Bhairavas (Eight aspects of Bhairava) and sculpted on temple roofs or terraces. Nepali Buddhists worship the Matrikas as described in Dharanisamgrahas.

The Malla king of Nepal Srinivasa Malla built the Patan durbar (court) in 1667 AD and is believed to have seen the Matrikas dance in the durbar one night. The king ordered that the Ashta-matrika be worshipped during the Ashwin Navaratri and cost is defrayed by the durbar. The custom has continued into modern times.

In the Kathmandu valley of Nepal, the Ashta-matrikas with a central village goddess are worshipped as protectors of the city or town. They are identified with the guardians of directions (digpala), places (lokapala) or lands (kshatrapala), satiated by blood sacrifice. Newar Buddhists associate the Matrikas with 24 human qualities, which can mastered by visiting three sets of eight Matrika pithas.

=== Tantric worship ===
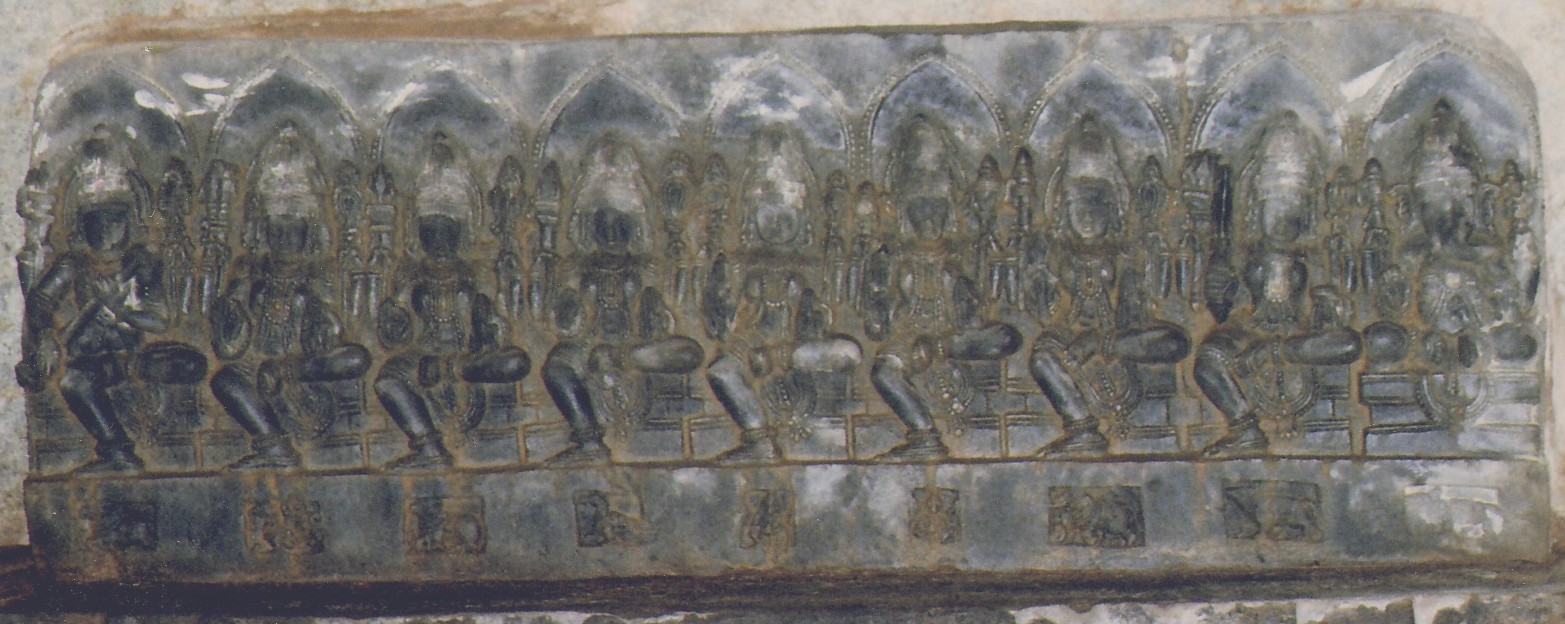
Shiva, Brahmani, Vaishnavi, Maheshvari, Kaumari, Varahi, Indrani, Chamundi, Ganesha at Panchalingeshvara temple in Karnataka

The 7th century Sanskrit author Banabhatta mentions the propitiation of Matrikas by a Tantric ascetic in his Harshacharita. The text mentions use of a māṭrmandala (mandala of the Matrikas) or a Yantra along with a special anusthana (ritual) to cure the ailing king. The text describes "young nobles (of the king) burning themselves with lamps to propitiate the Matrikas in a temple dedicated to the Matrikas (maṭṛ-gṛha). Banabhatta's Kadambari, Bhasa's Cārudatta, Shudraka's Mrichakatika mention the ritual offerings of food and shrines of Matrikas at crossroads. Other offerings include flowers and clothes and meat and wine for some Matrikas. Tantric works like Tantrarāja-Tantra (unknown date, author) and Kulacūḍāmaṇi discuss the worship of Matrikas as Shaktis or letters of the alphabet. A process of this worship, Matrika-nyasa (lit. "installation of the Mothers"), is described in Devi Gita, part of Devi Bhagavata Purana. It involves installation of powers of Matrikas – as letters of the alphabet – in one's body, by "feeling the deity worshipped in different parts of the body" like head, face, anus and legs and reciting mantras. The Hrillekha-matrika-nyasa, a more specialized form of Matrika-nyasa, combines the installation of "most powerful set of all letters (Matrikas)" with the seed syllable Hrīṃ of Goddess Bhuvaneshvari.

Stone inscriptions of Tantric worship of the Matrikas are found in Gangadhar, Rajasthan (by king Vishvavarman- 423 C.E., identified as the first epigraphic evidence of Tantra worship); in Bihar (by Guptas – fifth century) and in Deogarh, Uttar Pradesh (by Svāmibhaṭa – sixth century). The Gangadhar inscripture deals with a construction to a shrine to Chamunda and the other Matrikas, "who are attended by Dakinis (female demons)" and rituals of daily Tantric worship (Tantrobhuta) like the ritual of Bali (offering of grain).

The eight Matrikas are said to reside the second line of bhupura in Sri Chakra. They are frequently aligned with the Ashta Bhairavas, as in Jňānārṇava Tantra. The Svacchaṇḍa Tantra(1.33) explains that the primary function of Matrikas is to preside eight groups (vargas) of letters of Devanagari alphabet, while Brahmayāmala states they issue originate from the vowels.

=== Rituals and goals of worship ===
The Natya Shastra (13.66) recommends worship to Matrikas before setting up the stage and before dance performances. Indra declares in chapter 90 of Devi Purana that the Matrikas are the best among all deities and should be worshipped in cities, villages, towns and shields. Matrikas are generally to be worshipped on all occasions with Navagraha (the nine planets) and the Dikpala (Guardians of the directions) and at night with the Goddess.

The Matsya Purana and Devi Purana prescribe that Matrika shrines should be north-facing and be placed in northern part of a temple-complex. The temples of the Matrikas are found earliest dating to the fourth century and from textual evidence, it is predicated that "there must be impressive shrines all over the (Indian) subcontinent". Although circular Mandalas and Chakras are mentioned in religious texts, most existing shrines are rectangular in nature. Pal speculates that earlier circular shrines, which open to the sky or under trees of less durable material were replaced by the Guptas in stone as rectangular shrines.

The Devi Purana mentions the Matrikas or Deva Shaktis (powers of the gods) as group of seven or more, who should be worshipped for Mukti (liberation) by all, but particularly kings for powers of domination. The Saptamatrikas or Matrikas are worshipped for "personal and spiritual renewal" with Mukti as the ultimate goal as well as for powers to control and rule and earthly desires (Bhukti).Also important are the banners of the Saptamatrikas, which are carved outside the Udayagiri caves. These banners are called "Indra's sisters" in the Devi Purana. The Purana lists them as: swan, bull, peacock, conch, discus, elephant and skeleton – attributes of the Matrikas. A king installing these banners is believed to get mukti and bhukti. As per the Nitisara, Matrikas acted as the king's tangible Shaktis and conferred him the power to conquer and rule.

== See also ==
- Shaktism
- Mahavidya
- Navadurga
- Navaratri

== Sources ==
- Aryan, K. C. (1980). The Little Goddesses (Matrikas). New Delhi: Rekha Prakashan. ISBN 81-900002-7-6.
- Banerji, S. C. (2002). Companion to Tantra. Abhinav Publications. ISBN 81-7017-402-3.
- Bhattacharyya, N. N. (1974). History of the Sakta Religion. Munshiram Manoharlal Publishers.
- Brown, Cheever Mackenzie (1998). The Devi Gita: The Song of the Goddess: A Translation, Annotation, and Commentary. SUNY Press. ISBN 0-7914-3939-9.
- Berkson, Carmel (1992). Ellora, Concept and Style. Abhinav Publications. ISBN 81-7017-277-2.
- Brooks, Douglas Renfrew (1992). Auspicious Wisdom: The Texts and Traditions of Srividya Sakta Tantrism. SUNY Press. ISBN 0-7914-1145-1.
- Collins, Charles Dillard (1988). The Iconography and Ritual of Śiva at Elephanta. State University of New York Press.
- Dehejia, Vidya (1986). Yogini Cult and Temples: A Tantric Tradition. National Museum, Janpath, New Delhi.
- Harper, Katherine Anne; Brown, Robert L. (2002). The Roots of Tantra. SUNY Press. ISBN 0-7914-5305-7.
- Iltis, Linda (2002). "Goddesses, place, Identity in Nepal" (PDF). In Claus, Peter; Diamond, Sarah; Mills, Margaret (eds.). South Asian Folklore: An Encyclopedia. Routledge. pp. 257–260.
- Jain, Madhu; Handa, O. C. (1995). The Abode of Mahashiva: Cults and Symbology in Jaunsar-Bawar in the Mid – Himalayas. Indus Publishing. ISBN 81-7387-030-6.
- Kalia, Asha (1982). Art of Osian Temples: Socio-Economic and Religious Life in India, 8th–12th Centuries A.D. Abhinav Publications. ISBN 0-391-02558-9.
- Kamath, Suryanath U. (2001) [1980]. A concise history of Karnataka : from pre-historic times to the present. Bangalore: Jupiter books. LCCN 80905179. OCLC 7796041.
- Kinsley, David (1998) [1988]. Hindu Goddesses: Vision of the Divine Feminine in the Hindu Religious Traditions. Motilal Banarsidass. ISBN 81-208-0394-9.
- Pal, P. (1997). Singh, Nagendra Kumar (ed.). The Mother Goddesses According to the Devipurana. Anmol Publications. ISBN 81-7488-168-9.
- Pattanaik, Devdutt (2000). The Goddess in India: The Five Faces of the Eternal Feminine. Inner Traditions / Bear & Company. ISBN 0-89281-807-7.
- Rajarajan, R.K.K. (2015). "Early Pāṇḍya Siṃhavāhinī and Sapta Mātṛkā Sculptures in the Far South of India". Religions of South Asia. 9 (2): 164–185. doi:10.1558/rosa.v9i2.31071. ISSN 1751-2689.
- Reed, David; McConnachie, James (2002). The Rough Guide to Nepal. Rough Guides. ISBN 1-85828-899-1.
- Schastok, Sara L. (1985). The Śāmalājī Sculptures and 6th Century Art in Western India. Brill. ISBN 90-04-06941-0.
- Van den Hoek, Bert (1993). "Kathmandu as a sacrificial arena". In Nas, Peter J. M. (ed.). Urban Symbolism. Brill. ISBN 90-04-09855-0.
- Wangu, Madhu Bazaz (2003). Images of Indian Goddesses. Abhinav Publications. ISBN 81-7017-416-3.
- White, David Gordon (2006). Kiss of the Yogini: 'Tantric Sex' in its South Asian Contexts. University of Chicago Press. ISBN 978-0226894843.
- Woodroffe, Sir John (2001). The Garland of Letters. Chennai, India: Ganesh & Co. ISBN 81-85988-12-9.
- Wright, Daniel (1996). History of Nepal: With an Introductory Sketch of the Country and People of Nepal. Asian Educational Services. ISBN 81-206-0552-7.
- Zimmer, Heinrich (2001) [1960]. The Art Of Indian Asia, Its Mythology and Transformations. New Delhi: Motilal Banarsidas Publications.
