= Bhairab Naach =

Traditional dance of newar people

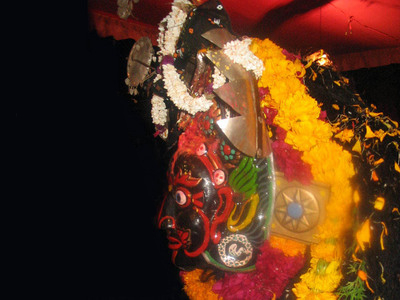
- Mask (Khwapa) of Bhairab
- Native name: Bhaila Pyankhan
- Genre: Traditional masked dance
- Instruments: Khin; Cymbals; Taah; Muhaali
- Inventor: Newar community
- Origin: Pokhara, Nepal

Bhaila Pyankhan, or "Bhairava's Dance" is a traditional masked dance performed by Newar community in the Pokhara Valley of Nepal as part of the Bhairab Jatra festival and named after Bhairab, an aspect of Shiva.

== History ==
The Bhairab Naach originated in Bhaktapur and was brought to Pokhara by migrating Newars. Although it was performed every 12 years in Bhaktapur, it is performed every 6 years in Pokhara Valley to maintain its cultural significance.

It was brought more than 236 years ago by Jitaram from Bhaktapur according to the guru Late Mr. Sarbagyaman Pradhananga . The rag (song) in this dance indicates that it was started at the time of last Malla King of Bhaktapur, Ranajit Malla.

== Dancers ==
There are 12 deities in this dance, namely Dagini (Dakini), Kwancha, Bhuccha, Bhairab, Kali (Budi Bhairab), Indrayani, Varahi, Kumari, Bishnuvi (Vaishnavi), Bramhayani (Brahmani), Maheswori (Gauri) and Ganesh (Ganesha). Bhairab leads and conducts the dance. Before the dance, all performers bathe and wear ceremonial clothes and masks (Khwapa). After wearing the mask, no performer can speak until it is taken off.

The dance is started at the Bhairab Temple in the evening and after a couple of rounds and puja it is taken to the hosting place where it is performed for around six hours including puja.

At first all 12 gods dance. After the puja is complete then individual dance starts. First is Bhairab with Kwancha and Bhuccha which is like a child and adult play. It is called a. After that Bhairab, Kali, Indrayani and Barah come. It lasts almost one hour and called a Char Bhairab. It is an energetic dance and most people love to watch this part of the dance. Then come Kumari, Bishnuvi, Bramhayani and Ganga. Then Ganesh dances solo. Then come Kwancha and Bhuchha, again with their like childlike playing. At the end comes Dagini. In the closing act all 12 Bhairabs participate. Then the ending puja is performed and they return to the Bhairab Temple.

== Other similar dances ==
Comparable dances include the Pachali Bhairab Naach of Pachali; the Naradevi Jatra of Naradevi Tole; the Bhadrakali Khadga Siddi Nach of Kathmandu and the Layaku Bhaila (Royal Bhairab) of Madhyapur Thimi.

== Gallery ==
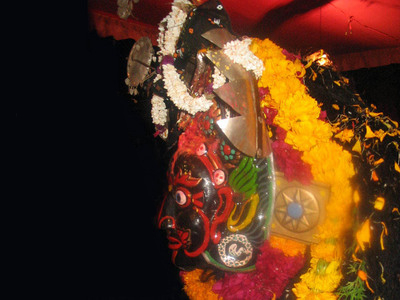
Bhairab

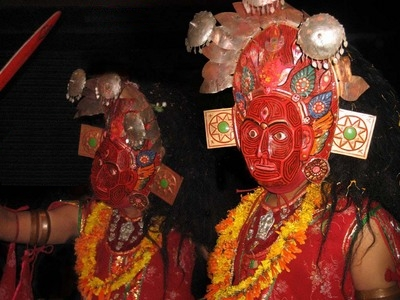
Kali (Budi) Bhairab

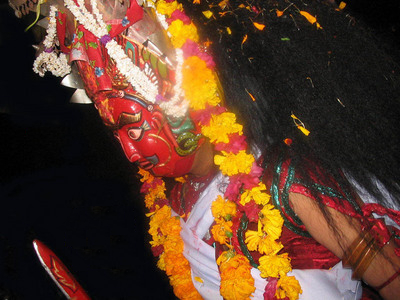
Indrayani

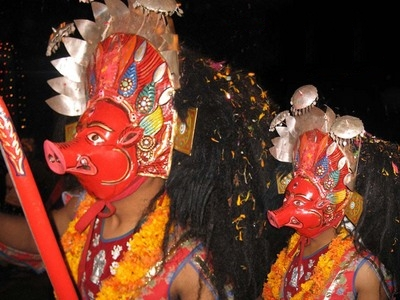
Barah

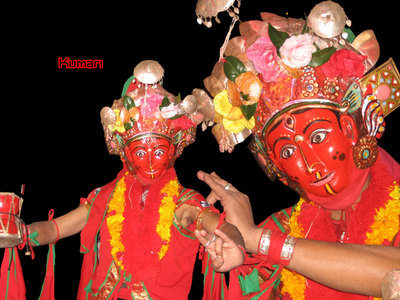
Kumari

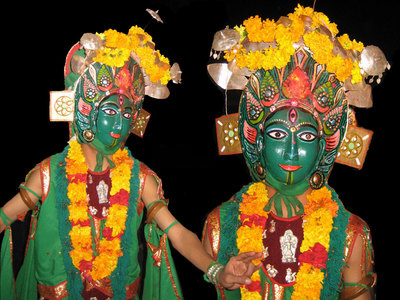
Bishnuvi

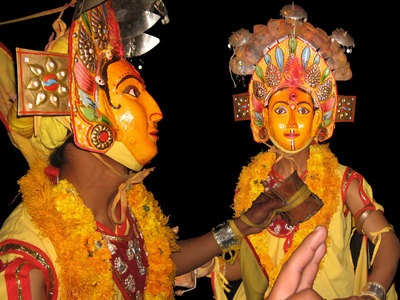
Bramhayani

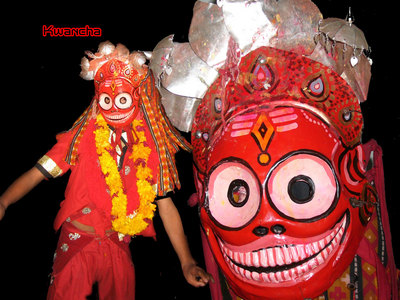
Kawancha

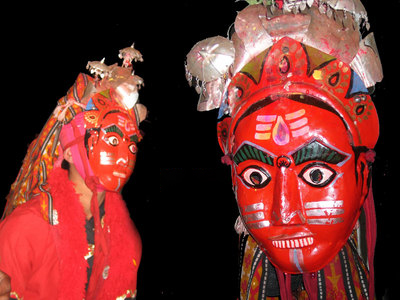
Bhuccha

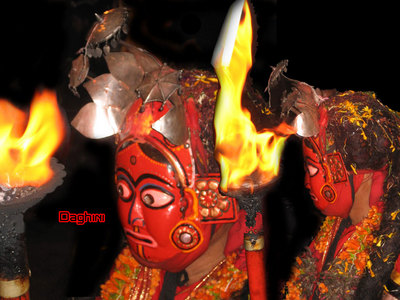
Dagini
