= Panchalingeshwara Temple, Govindanahalli =

Panchalingeshwara Temple
- Hindu temple
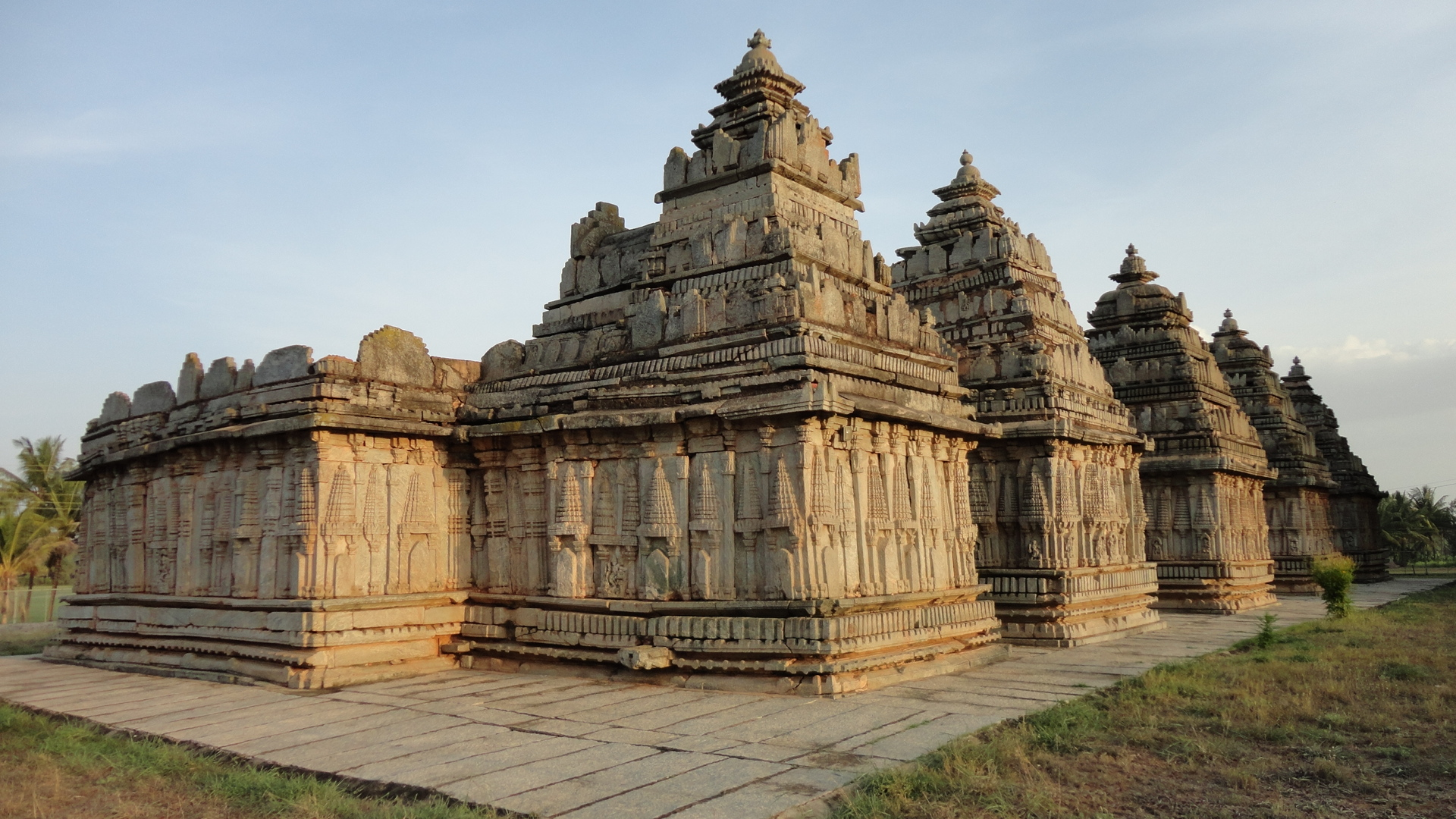
- Panchalingeshwara temple (1230 A.D.) at Govindanahalli, full view from north-west

- Location in Karnataka, India Panchalingeshwara Temple (India)
- Country: India
- State: Karnataka
- District: Mandya District

Languages
  - Official: Kannada
- Time zone: UTC+5:30 (IST)
- PIN: 571432
- ISO 3166 code: IN-KA

Panchalingeshwara Temple (also spelt Panchalingeshvara) in Govindanahalli, Mandya district, Karnataka state, India, was constructed around 1238 A.D. during the reign of the Hoysala empire King Vira Someshwara. The name "Panchalingeshwara" literally means "five linga" (pancha - five and linga - the universal symbol of the god Shiva). The temple is protected as a monument of national importance by the Archaeological Survey of India. The famous sculptor of Hoysala times, Ruvari Mallitamma, is known to have made contributions to the temple.

== Temple plan ==
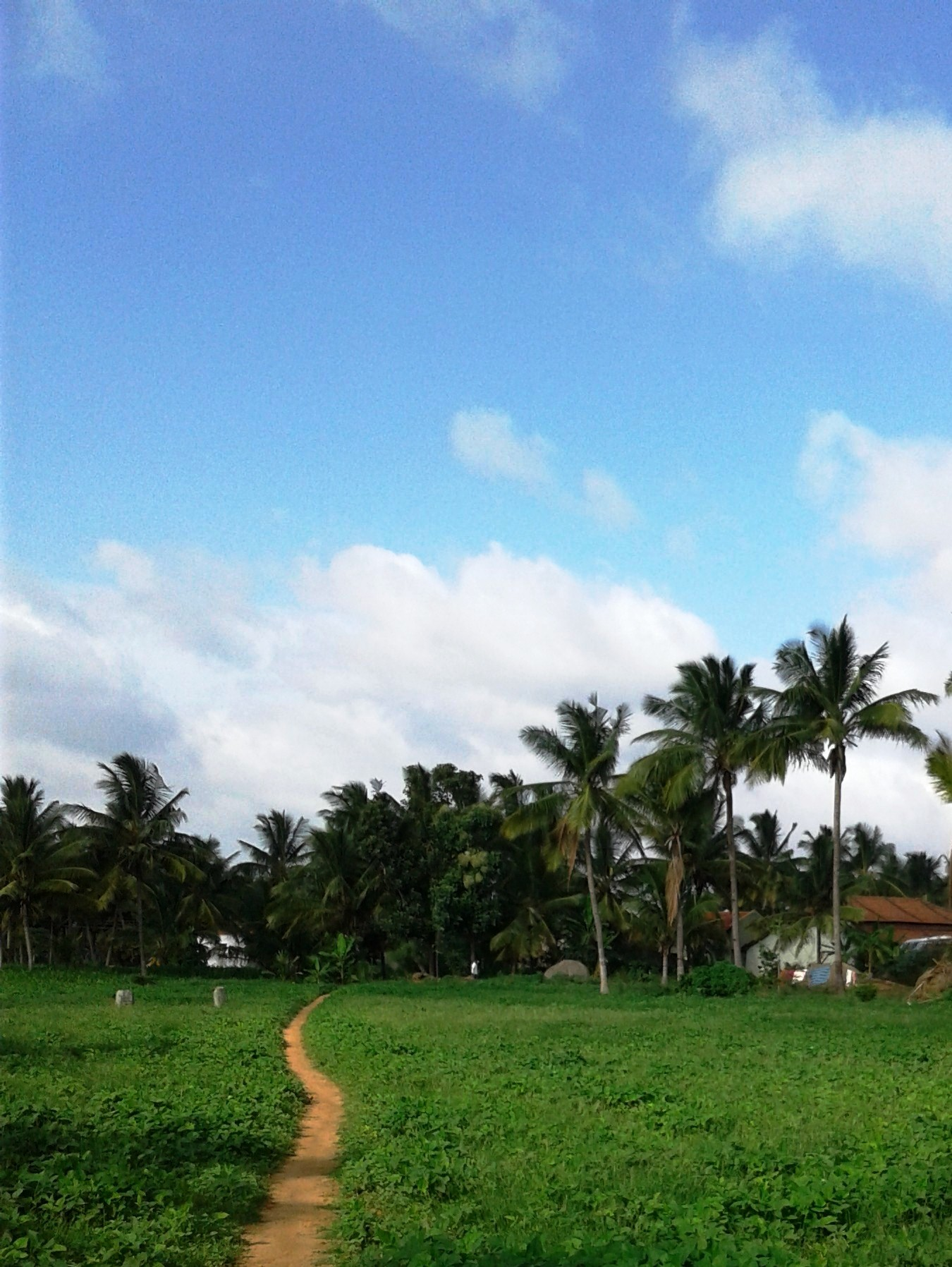
Govndanahalli village

According to art historian Gerard Foekema, the Panchalingeshwara temple is a rare example of a panchakuta (lit, five shrines with five towers) construction in Hoysala architecture. The five shrines are built on a north-south axial plan with the sanctums face east. In each shrine, the sanctum (garbhagriha) is connected to a hall (mantapa or navaranga) by a vestibule with sukanasi above. A long pillared hall on the east connects the individual mantapa together. The entrance to the temple complex is via two porched entrances whose ceiling are supported by lathe turned pillars. Irrespective of the number of shrines in the complex, these are standard features in Hoysala temples. The porches are located in front of the second and third shrines.

The decoration (articulation) on the outer walls of the shrines (vimana) is modest and comprises miniature decorative towers (aedicula) on pilasters. The wall panel of images between the eave and the base moldings (adhisthana) include some depictions from the Hindu epics. According to Gerard Foekema, this form of treatment is common to Hoysala art. The tower over each shrine (shikhara) comprises the standard three tiers of roofs with each vertically ascending tier diminishing in height. Above this is a structure called the stupi that holds the finial, a decorative water-pot like structure called the Kalasha. The vestibule of each shrine has a low protruding tower (also called sukanasi, meaning "nose"). This tower is shorter than the main tower over the shrine and hence appears like an extension of it. The inner walls of the each mantapa have seventeen niches many of which house sculptures of merit.

== Image gallery ==
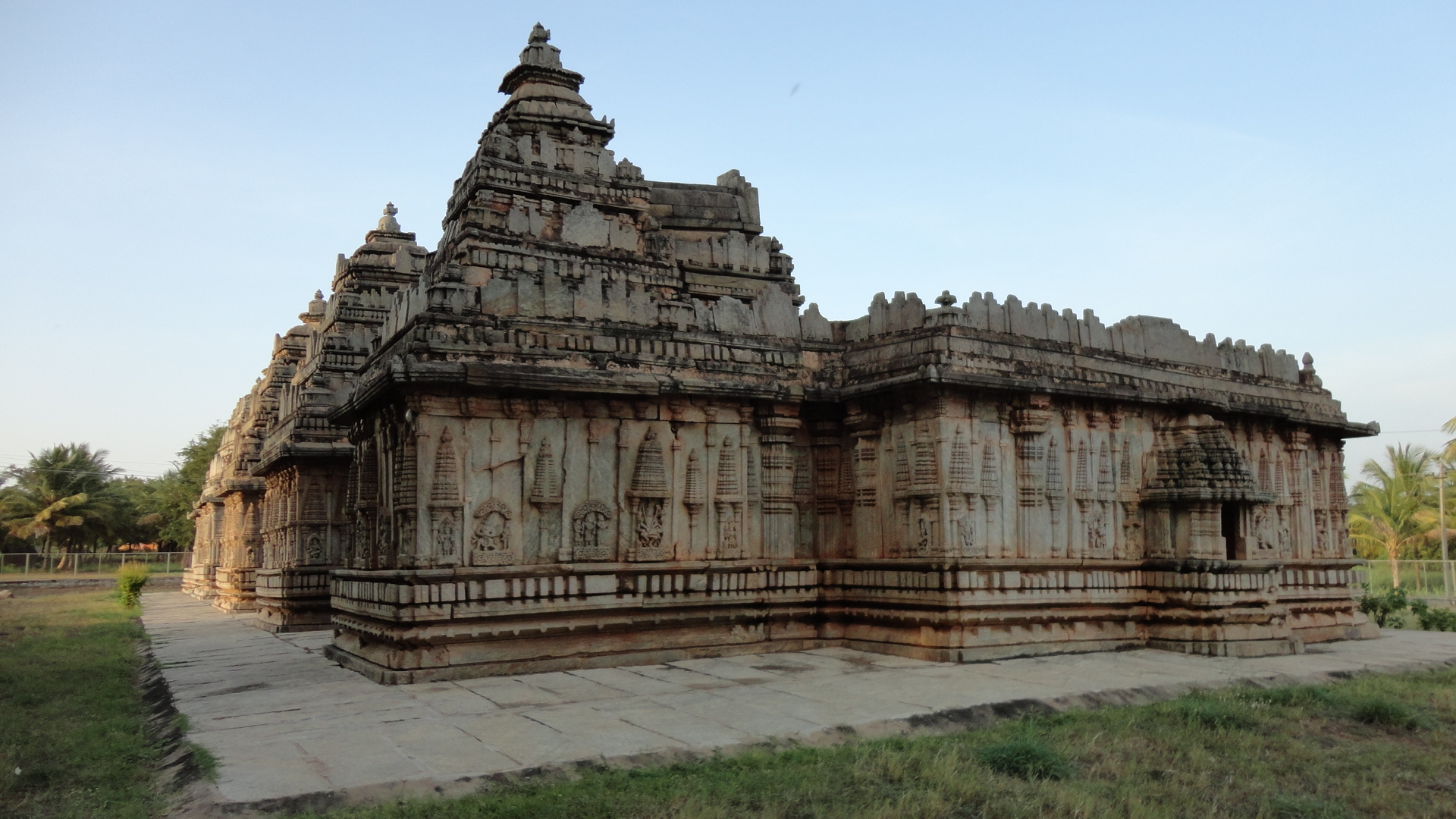
Relief on southern shrine wall

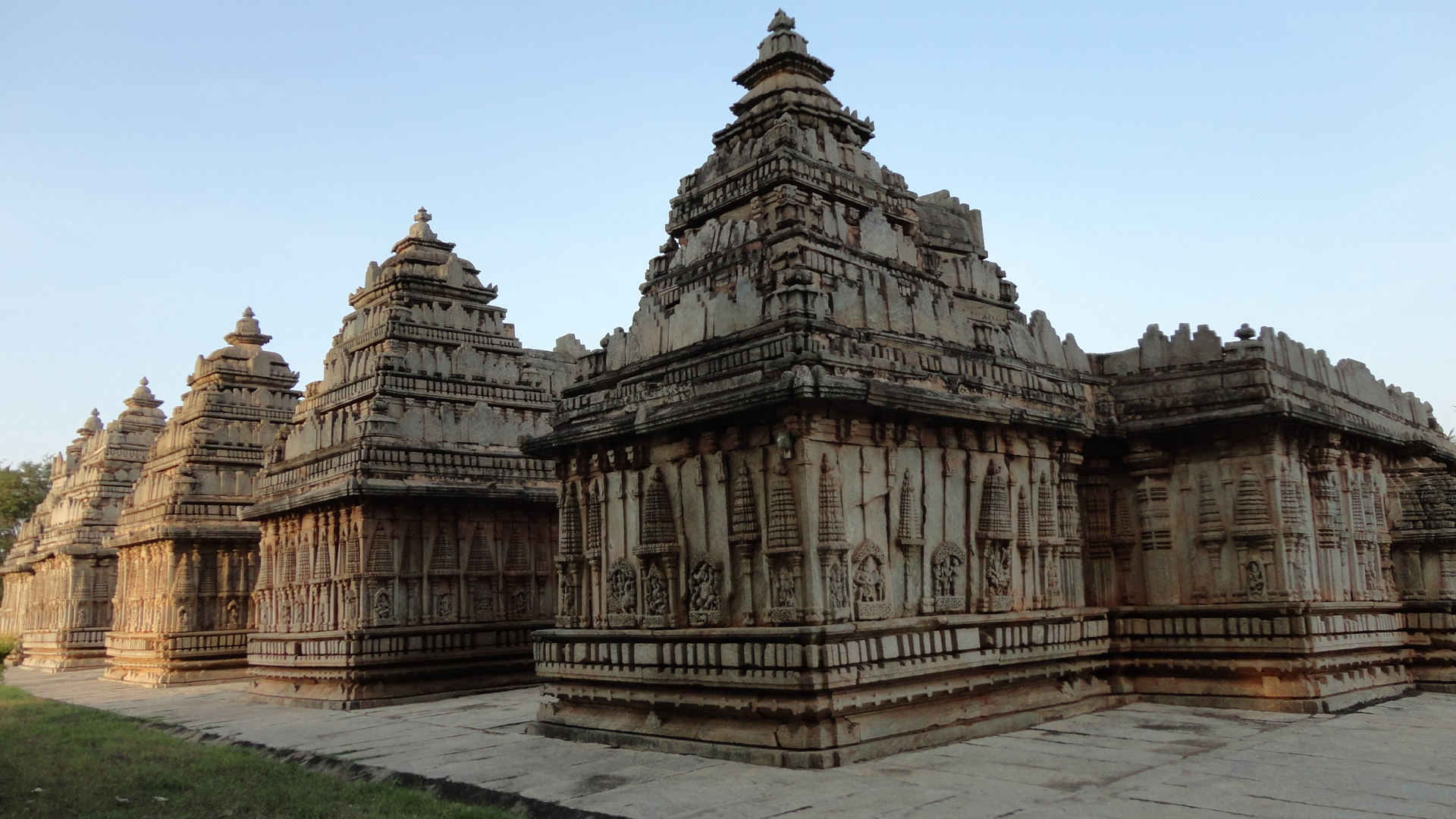
Another view of the Panchalingeshwara temple

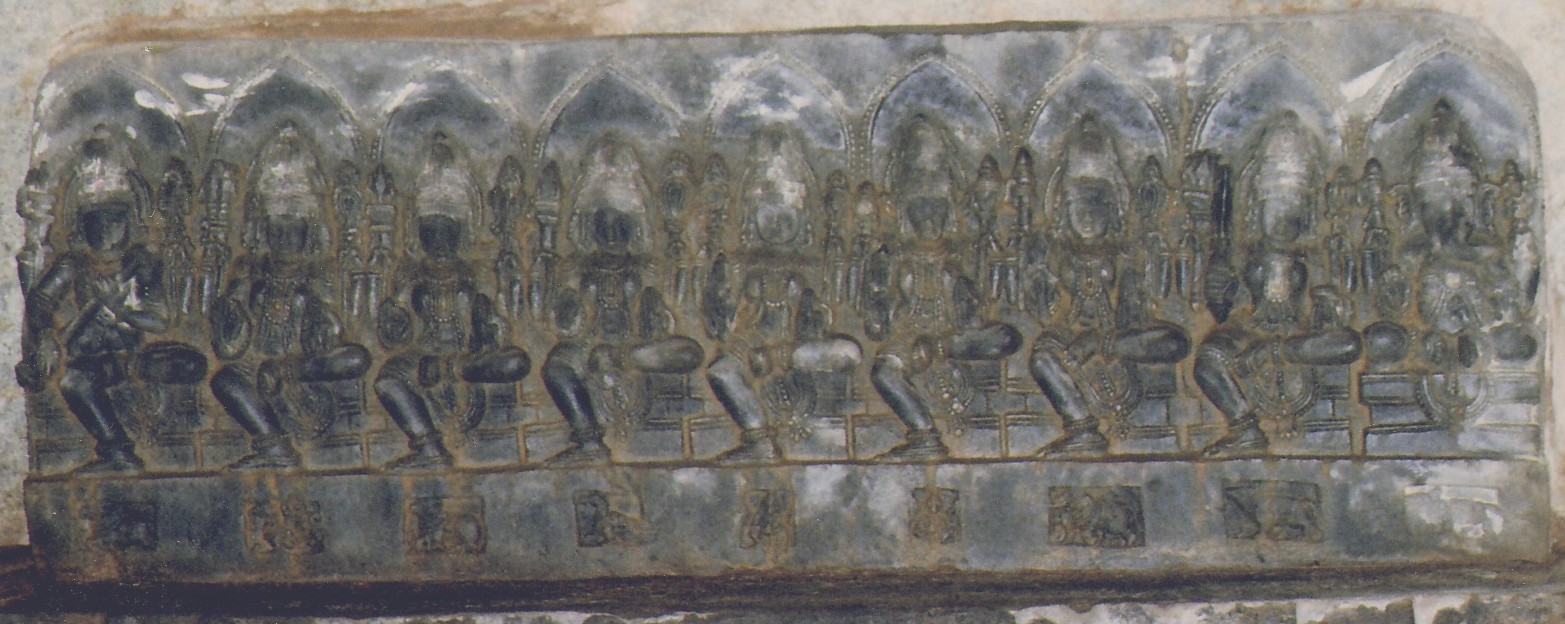
Matrikas sculpture in relief

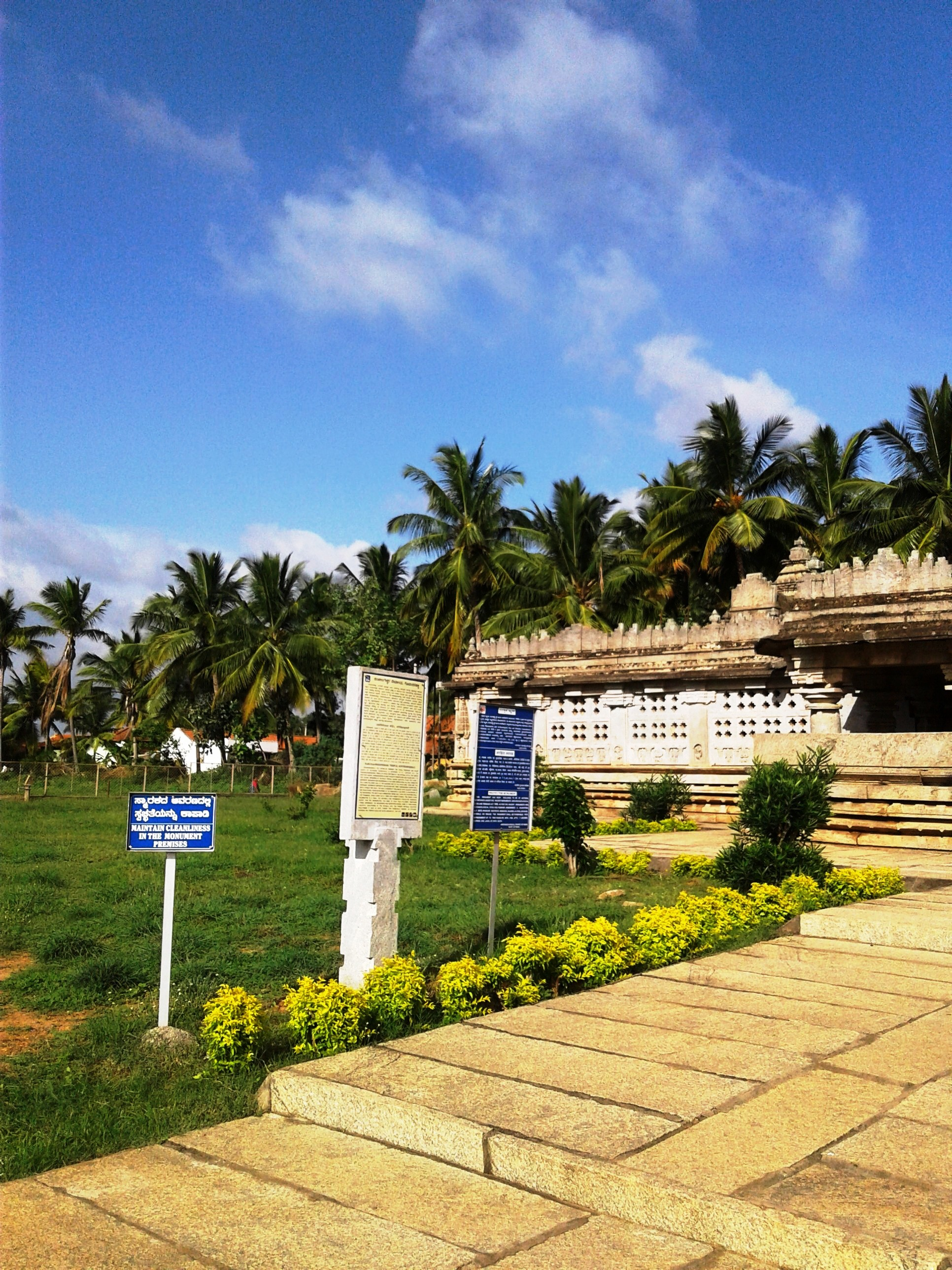
Temple Entrance

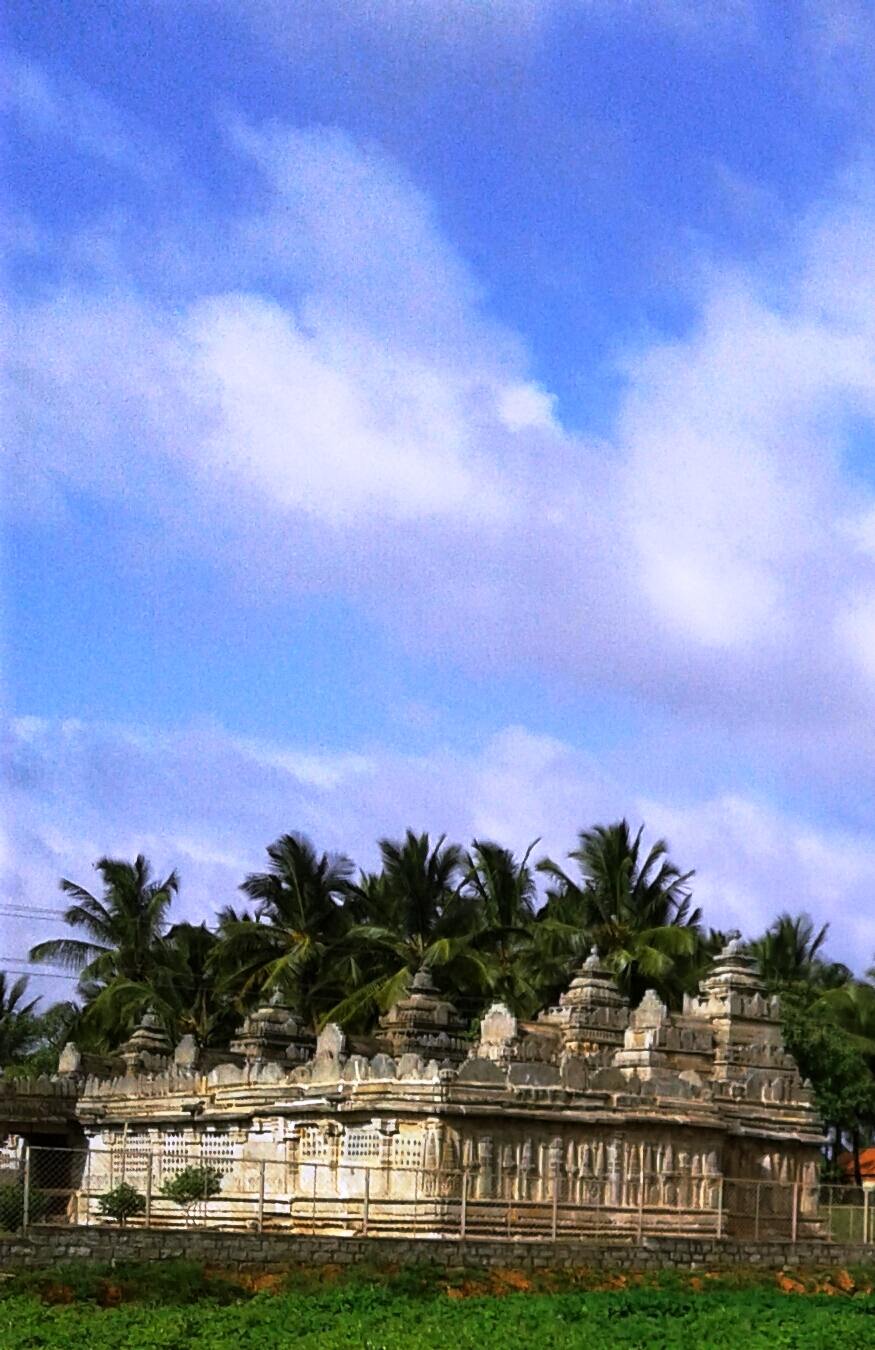
View of the temple from the east

== See also ==
- Govindanahalli
- Kikkeri
- Holenarasipura
