= Asta Matrika Dance =

Traditional dance of Nepal

The Asta Matrika Dance also called Gaan: Pyakhan is a traditional dance of Lalitpur district and is performed on the day of Ghatasthapana, the first day of Dasin festival. The dance is estimated to be 350 years old, introduced during the Malla Regime in Kathmandu valley. The dance is performed by the Shakyas and Bajracharyas community. The dance depicts the eight matrikas (or goddess), namely, Kumari, Vaishnavi, Indirayeni, Bhramayani, Maheswor, Barahi, Ganesh, Chamunda and Mahalaxmi.

== Mythology ==
According to the mythology, king Shrinivas Malla saw in his dream a mother goddess dancing in the royal court at Mulchowk. On the next day he ordered to perform a similar dance in his kingdom.

In the early days, 13 dancers performed for 13 god and goddesses along with 13 dance teachers and musicians representing 13 Dev Gad. The god and goddesses are marked with different colors Simhini(white), Bhairav(blue), Ganesh(white), Kumara(red), Brahmayani(grey), Barahi(red), Indrayani(yellow), Mahalaxmi(yellow), Kaumari(red), Vaishanavi(green), Mahakali/Chamunda(red), Rudrayani(white) and Vhyagrihi(yellow).
