= Rudrakodisvarar Temple, Sempankudi =

Shiva temple in Tamil Nadu, India

Coordinates: 11.24774°N 79.76297°E

Rudrakodisvarar Temple is a Hindu temple dedicated to the deity Shiva, located at Sempankudi in Mayiladuthurai district in Tamil Nadu, India.

== Vaippu Sthalam ==
It is one of the shrines of the Vaippu Sthalams sung by Tamil Saivite Nayanar Appar. As Kethu worshipped the deity, this place was known as Sempambinkudi Naganathar.

== Presiding deity ==
The presiding deity in the garbhagriha is represented by the lingam known as Rudrakodisvarar and Naganathar. The Goddess is known as Tirupurasundari and Karpuravalli.

== Specialities ==
During the churning of divine ocean, Amrita came out. While Devas and asuras fought for the amritha, Vishnu decided to give it to Devas. At that time an asura took the form of a Deva and drunk it. Knowing this, Chandra and Surya informed Vishnu about this. Vishnu hit the asura and killed him. The head of asura fell in Sirapuram which is now known as Sirkazhi and the body fell in other place which was known as Sempambinkudi and later became Sempankudi and Sempankudi. Due to consuming of Amrita, his body became two parts which in turn into two snakes. They worshipped Shiva to get rid from it. Shiva bestowed blessings and thus came into existence Rahu, with human head and snake body and Kethu with snake head and human body. Later they became one among the Navagrahas.

== Structure ==
The temple has a compound wall with an entrance. After entering through the entrance bali pita and nandhi could be found. In the prakara shrines of Vishnu, Ganesha, Subramania with his consorts Valli and Deivanai are found. The shrine of the Goddess is facing south. In the prakara, saptamatas are found. Kethu is found in a separate shrine. In the kosta, Dakshinamurthy, Lingodbhava and Durga are found.

== Location ==
From the old bus stand of Sirkazhi in the Tirumullaivayil road, at a distance of 1 km Sempankudi is found. From there in a narrow path this temple could be reached. One time puja is held in this temple regularly.
