= Ponsei Natrunaiyappar Temple =

Hindu temple in Tamil Nadu, India

Natrunaiyappar Kovil
- Natrunaiyappar Temple
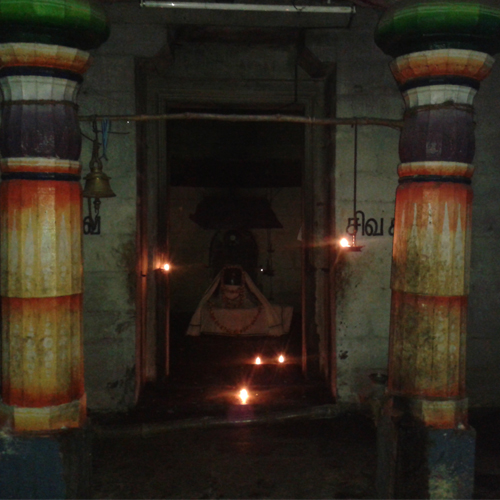

- Location in Tamil Nadu

Religion
- Affiliation: Hinduism
- District: Mayiladuthurai
- Deity: Shiva
- Festival: Chithirai Thiruvizha

Location
- Location: Ponsei
- State: Tamil Nadu
- Country: India
- Coordinates: 11°7′50.4″N 79°45′34.6″E

Architecture
- Type: Dravidian Architecture
- Creator: Parantaka Chola I(907–950)
- Completed: 10th century AD

Natrunaiyappar Temple, is a Hindu temple dedicated to Shiva, located in Ponsei, also known as Thirunanipalli, in Mayiladuthurai district, Tamil Nadu, India. The temple is situated in the Chola Nadu region, south of the Kaveri River, and located 9.65 km (6.00 mi) from Mayiladuthurai. It is classified as a Paadal Petra Sthalam, one of the temples dedicated to Shiva glorified in the Tamil Tevaram hymns.

== History ==
The temple is believed to date back to the 9th century and is traditionally attributed to Parantaka Chola I (907–950), an ancestor of Rajaraja Chola I. It is considered a pre-Rajaraja Chola temple, although its renovation was reportedly completed during his reign. The Chandesvarar shrine is thought to retain elements of the earlier structure, while the central shrine may have been rebuilt during the renovation. Alternatively, stones from the original central shrine may have been reused in the construction of the sub-shrine. The temple is approximately 1,000 years old. Its large sanctum and mandapas reflect the architectural features of the Chola period.

The temple is counted 157th of 275 temples that are revered in the verses of Tevaram and are amongst the greatest Shiva temples. The temple is counted as one of the temples built on the banks of River Kaveri.

=== Inscriptions ===
The temple contains inscriptions from the Chola and Vijayanagara periods. The earliest inscription, dated to the fourth regnal year of Aditya II (Parakesarivarman), is found on the walls of the Chandesvarar shrine, while the earliest inscription on the main shrine dates to the 22nd regnal year of Rajaraja Chola I. The inscriptions refer to the presiding deity as Tiru-nani-Palli Udaiyar and Periya Tali Mahadevar. Records of Rajendra Chola I document an endowment by the assembly of Talachchangadu for daily worship and an annual festival. Later inscriptions of Vikrama Chola record provisions for betel-leaf cultivation for the goddess, while those of Rajadhiraja Chola II mention endowments for Vinayakar worship and the settlement of privileges granted to artisan communities. An inscription of Kulottunga Chola I also records temple-related activities. A later inscription of Vijayanagara emperor Krishnadevaraya records the remission of taxes worth 1,000 gold varahas for important Shiva and Vishnu temples in the Chola region.

== Etymology ==
The presiding deity, now known as Natrunai Isvarar, was referred to in inscriptions as Tiru-nani-Palli Udaiyar. The name Nanipalli is traditionally believed to have originated from Nanni, who is said to have initially built the temple. The Tamil word palli can refer to a temple or religious establishment.

Nanipalli is traditionally associated with the life of the Tamil Saivite saint Thirugnanasambandar. His mother, Bhagavathiar, is believed to have been born in this village. Sambandar composed a Pathigam (decade of devotional hymns) in praise of Lord Shiva at the Natrunaiyappar Temple. According to local tradition, the area, which was once a barren tract, was transformed into fertile agricultural land through his divine intervention. The village subsequently came to be known as Ponsei (பொன்செய்), referring to its fertile agricultural landscape.

== Legend ==
According to local tradition, Vinayaka was cursed by sage Agastya for overturning his water pot while disguised as a crow. He is believed to have regained his original form after worshipping Shiva at the temple. The crow is said to have emerged from the temple tank with a golden colour, from which the village derives its name, Ponsei, referring to a transformation into gold.

Another tradition associates the village with Thirugnanasambandar, whose mother, Bhagavathiar, is believed to have been born there. According to this account, Sambandar sang hymns while seated on the shoulders of his father, Sivapada Irudayar, transforming the surrounding barren land into fertile agricultural fields. The temple also has a shrine dedicated to Kalyanasundareswarar, commemorating the tradition that sage Agastya witnessed the divine wedding of Shiva and Parvati.

== Architecture ==
The east-facing temple consists of a square garbhagriha (sanctum sanctorum), an antarala, an ardhamandapa and a mukhamandapa, the latter measuring approximately 35 ft (11 m) and supported by sixteen pillars. The mukhamandapa is identified with the Mummudi Cholan Mandapa, possibly built or named after Rajaraja I. The sanctum and ardhamandapa feature devakoshta niches depicting Ganesa, Agastya, Dakshinamurti, Lingodbhava, Brahma and Durga. The makara toranas above these niches contain sculptures depicting Kalyanasundara, Ardhanarisvara, Kali and Urdhva Tandava. The temple also features bhutagana friezes, kudus and 64 miniature sculptures along the plinth. A statue identified as that of Vijayalaya Chola is found on the temple wall. The circular griva and sikhara, originally constructed of stone, have subsequently been replaced with brick and stucco.

== Religious significance ==
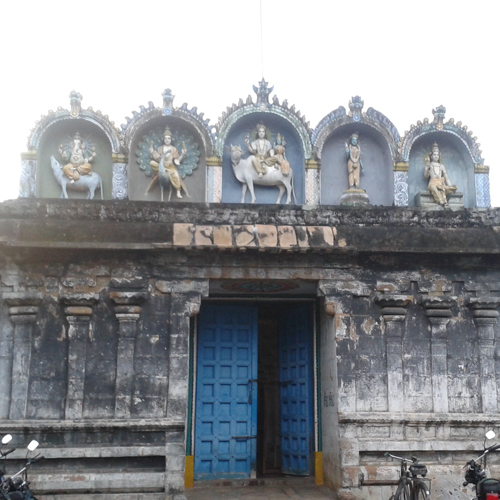
Ponsei Natrunaiyappr Temple-Entrance

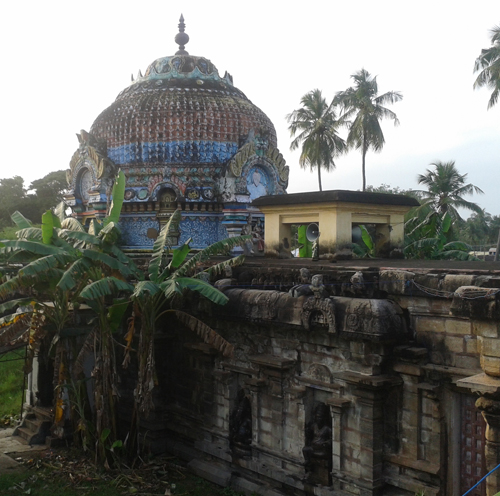
Ponsei Natrunaiyappar Temple Karuvarai gopuram

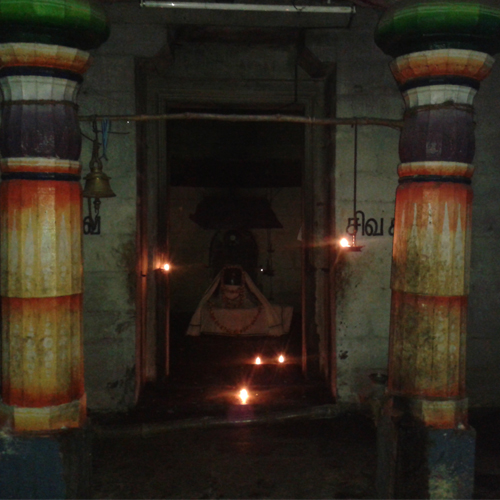
Ponsei Natrunaiyappar temple Moolavar Natrunaiyappar

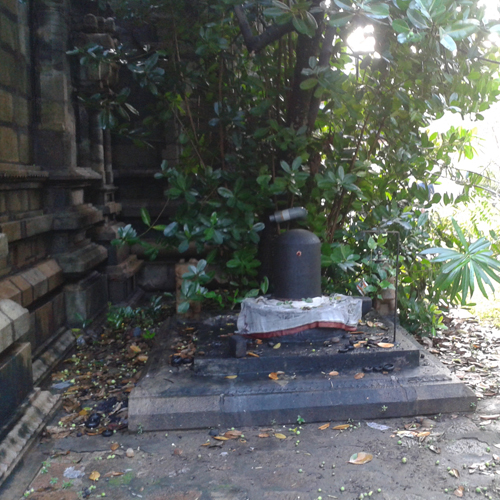
Ponsei Natrunaiyappar Temple Thala Virutcham

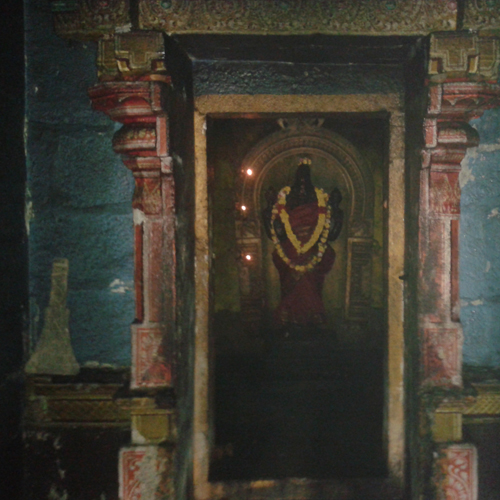
Ponsei Natrunaiyappar Temple Malaiyaan madanthai Amman

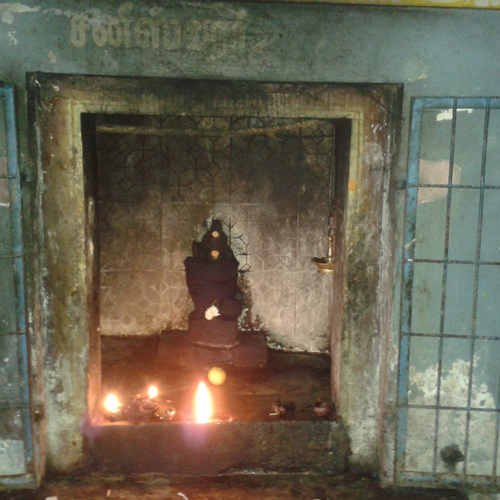
Lord Saneeswarar.

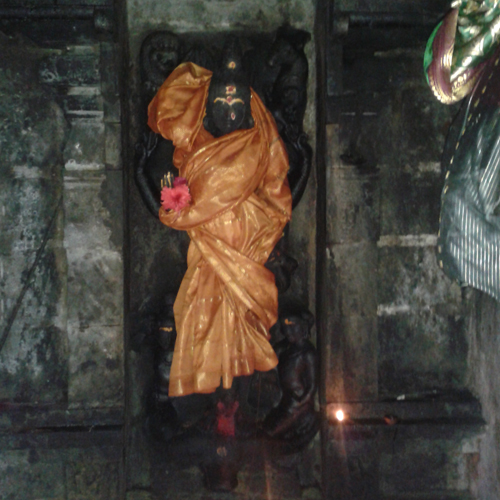
Ponsei Natrunaiyappar Temple Durga

In this temple Lord Shiva called Natrunaiyappar. In the mind of the fear he can remove and guide into good path of your life so-called Natrunaiyappar. Lord shiva grace with Malaiyaan madanthai and Parvatha Putthiri are his wives.
From Tamil Saiva hymns, Tirugnana Sambanthar, Appar and Sundarar were sung a song to Thirunanipalli Natrunaiyappar. These poems are appeared in Tevara Thirumuraigal.

Thirugnanasambandar was sung a song into Thirunanipalli Natrunaiyappar called Kaaraigal Kukaimullai(காரைகள் கூகைமுல்லை)

காரைகள் கூகைமுல்லை களவாகை ஈகை
படர்தொடரி கள்ளி கவினிச்
சூரைகள் பம்மிவிம்மு சுடுகா டமர்ந்த
சிவன்மேய சோலை நகர்தான்
தேரைக ளாரைசாய மிதிகொள்ள வாளை
குதிகொள்ள வள்ளை துவள
நாரைக ளாரல்வார வயன்மேதி வைகும்
நனிபள்ளி போலு நமர்காள்.

Translation

Kāraikaḷ, kūkai, mullai, kaḷa, vākai, īkai, spreading toṭari and kaḷḷi growing beautifully and luxuriantly.
the city with gardens which Civaṉ who loved the cremation ground where cūraikal which grow crowded are full, desired to dwell.
the frogs trample on ārai to make it bend.
the scabbard fish leap the creeping hindweed becomes flexible when the cranes catch in a sweep a kind of fish called ārai People belonging to our religion!
is Naṉipaḷḷi where the buffaloes wallow in the fields.

- 11 tevara poems-84th praise-II Volume of Thirumurai- wrote by Sambandar for Thirunanipalli Natrunaiyappar.

Tirunavukkarasar was sung a song to Thirunanipalli Natrunaiyappar called Mutrunai Yayinanai(முற்றுணை யாயினானை)

முற்றுணை யாயி னானை மூவர்க்கும் முதல்வன் றன்னைச்
சொற்றுணை யாயி னானைச் சோதியை யாத ரித்து
உற்றுணர்ந் துருகி யூறி யுள்கசி வுடைய வர்க்கு
நற்றுணை யாவர் போலு நனிபள்ளி யடிக ளாரே.

English-Translation

Civaṉ who is the companion from time immemorial the origin of the trinity of Piramaṉ,
Māl and Uruttiraṉ who can be understood by the help of knowledge of ākamam -
who is the help to understand the correct meaning of vetams cherishing
with love the light for those whose hearts melt being immersed having realised him intimately,
Civaṉ in naṉipaḷḷi will become a good companion and guide.

- 9 tevara poems-70th praise-Fourth(IV) Thirumurai- written by Thirunavukkarasar.

Sundarar-Aadhiyan Aadhiraiyan(ஆதியன் ஆதிரையன்)

ஆதியன் ஆதிரை யன்அயன் மால்அறி தற்கரிய
சோதியன் சொற்பொரு ளாய்ச்சுருங் காமறை நான்கினையும்
ஓதியன் உம்பர்தங் கோனுல கத்தினுள் எவ்வுயிர்க்கும்
நாதியன் நம்பெரு மான்நண்ணும் ஊர்நனி பள்ளியதே.

English-Translation

Civaṉ is the source of all things.
he has the star Ātirai as his favourite star.
is the light that Ayaṉ and Māl could not know.
being himself the words and their meanings.
he recited with the proper intonation the four elaborate vētams.
is the chief of the celestials in heaven.
naṉipaḷḷi is the place that our Lord who is the chief of all living being in this world, dwells.

- 10 tevara poems written by sundarar in seventh(7th) volume of thirumurai of 97th praise to Thirunanipalli Natrunaiyappar.

=== Features of Temple ===
• Lord Shiva granted His wedding darshan to Lord Vinayaka and Sage Agastya.
•Appar, Sundarar and Thirugna Sambandar wrote a poem to Thirunanipalli Natrunaiyappar in Tevara Tirumuraigal.
•It is the 106th temple of 275 Shiva temples located in Teveram.
•In the Chola period this temple was called “Jayan konda valanaattu aakkoor naattupirathameyamaagiya nanipalli (ஜயங் கொண்ட வளநாட்டு ஆக்கூர் நாட்டுப்பிரமதேயமாகிய நனிபள்ளி)"
•A large number of rare sculptures appear in this temple. These were all considered the pride of the Chola Empire.
•This is the 43rd Shiva temple in the southern bank of Cauvery, praised in Tevaram hymns.

== Festivals ==
Every year from the date of 7 April to 13 April where celebrating a Chithirai Thiruvizha.

== Miniature sculptures around the shrine ==
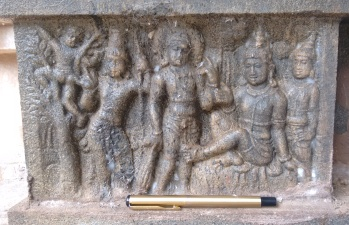

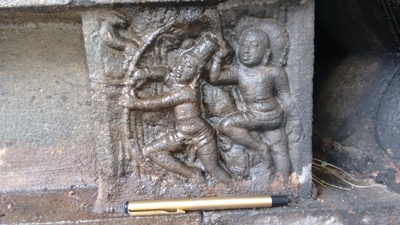

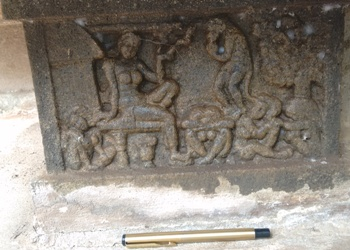

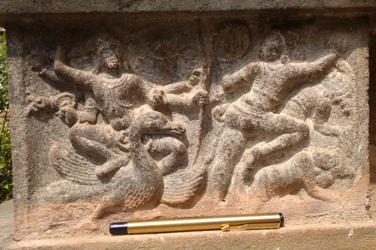

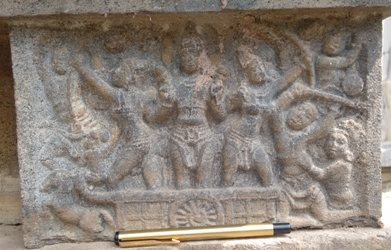

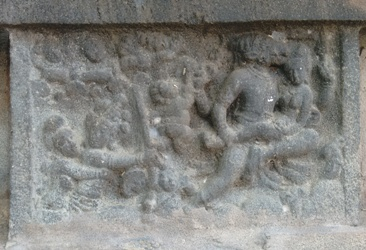

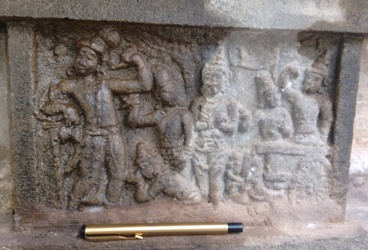
