= Karkodeswarar Temple, Kamarasavalli =

Temple in Tamil Nadu, India

Religion
- Affiliation: Hinduism
- District: Ariyalur district
- Deity: Lord Shiva

Location
- Location: Thirumanur in Ariyalur district
- State: Tamil Nadu
- Country: India
- Interactive map of Karkodeswarar Temple, Kamarasavalli

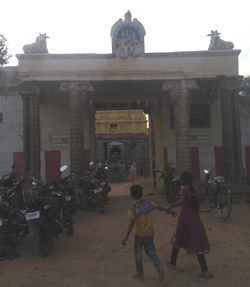
Entrance to the temple

Karkodeswarar temple, Kamarasavalli is a Hindu temple located at Kamarasavalli near Thirumanur in Ariyalur district of Tamil Nadu, India.

== The Presiding deity ==
The presiding deity known as Karkodeswarar is facing east. His consort Balambika is facing south.

== Significance ==
The temple has a sculpture in which Kardodaga is seen performing puja for Shiva, with Vinayaka and Nandi (bull). It is said that people of the Cancer zodiac sign should pray here for relief.

== Shrines ==
In the Prakaram, shrines of Vinayaka, Subramania with his consorts Valli and Deivanai, Durga, Chandikesvarar and Navagraha are found. In the kosta, Dakshinamurthy, Ardhanarishvara, Lingodbhava and Brahma are found. The temple has a mandapa for Nataraja.

== Photogallery ==
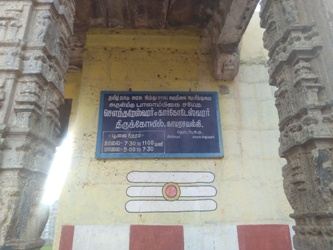
Board

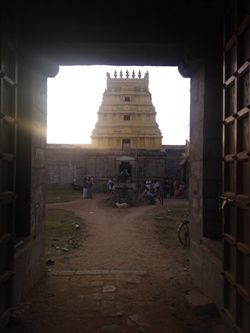
Rajagopura

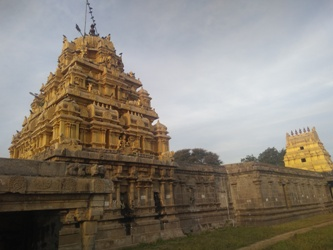
North Prakaram

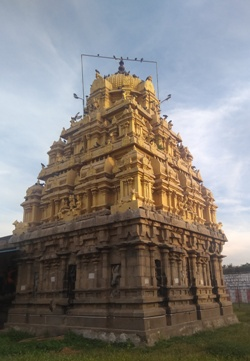
Vimana of the presiding deity

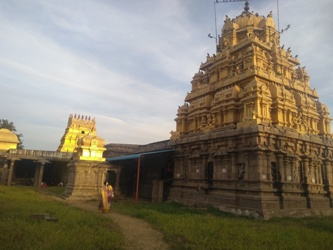
South Prakaram

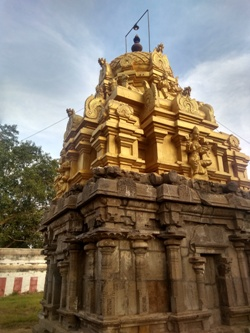
Vimana of the goddess

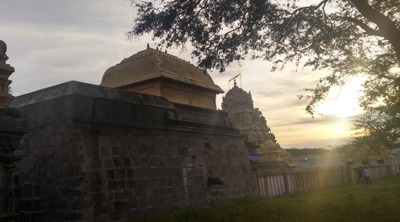
Vimana of Nataraja

== Sculptures ==
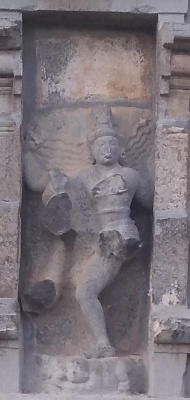

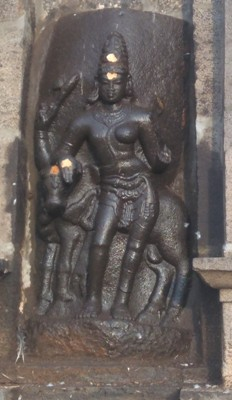

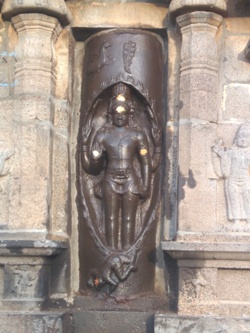

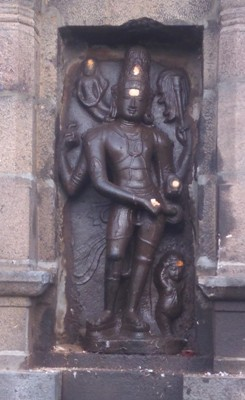

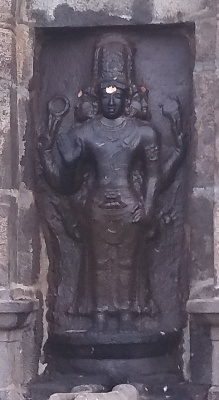

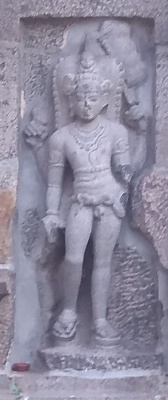

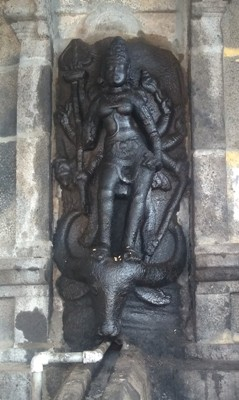
