= Arakeshvara Temple, Hole Alur =

Arakeshvara Temple
- Hindu temple
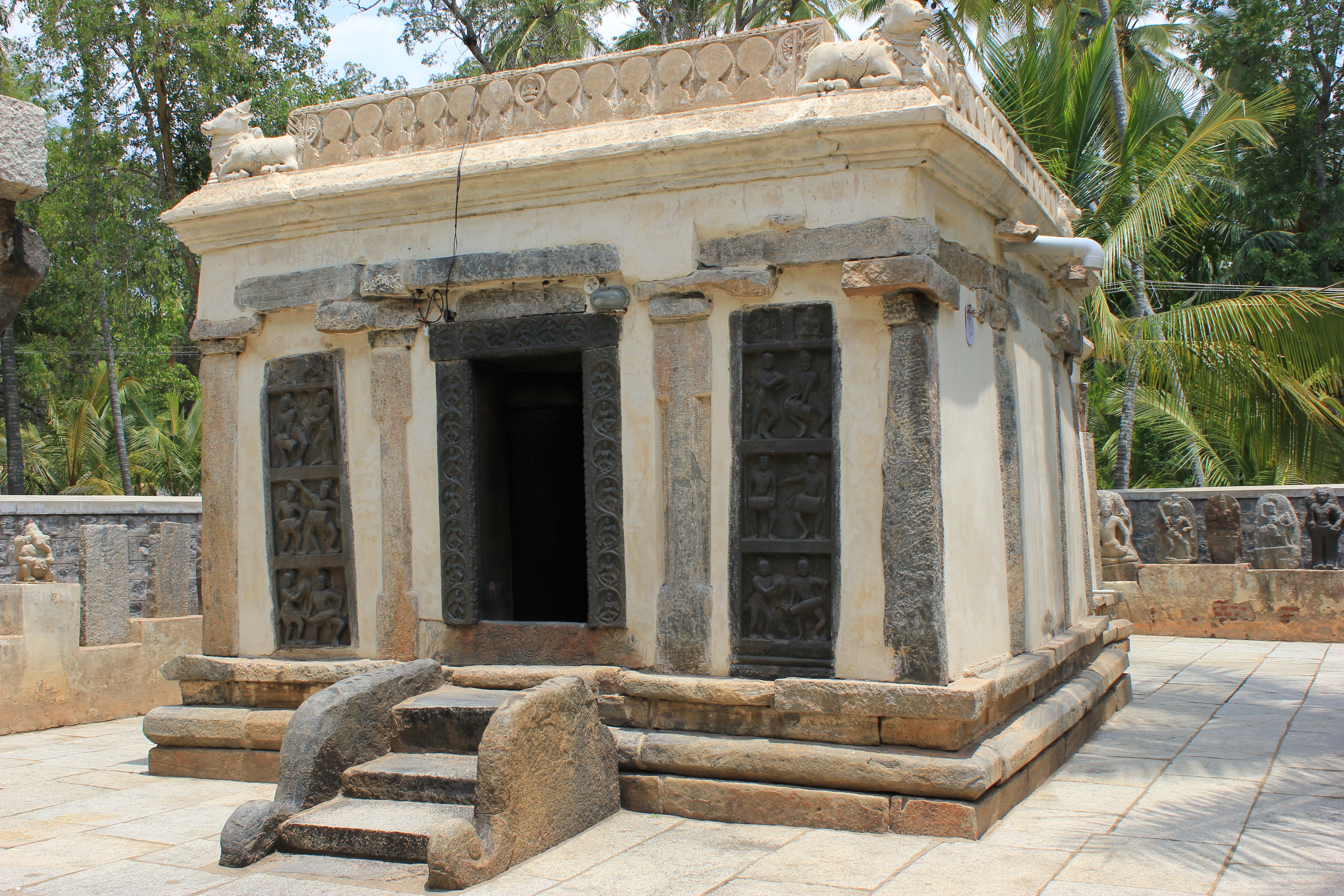
- View of Arakeshvara temple mantapa (10th century A.D.)

- Location in Karnataka, India
- Coordinates: 11°58′05″N 76°59′16″E
- Country: India
- State: Karnataka
- District: Chamarajanagar District

Languages
  - Official: Kannada
- Time zone: UTC+5:30 (IST)

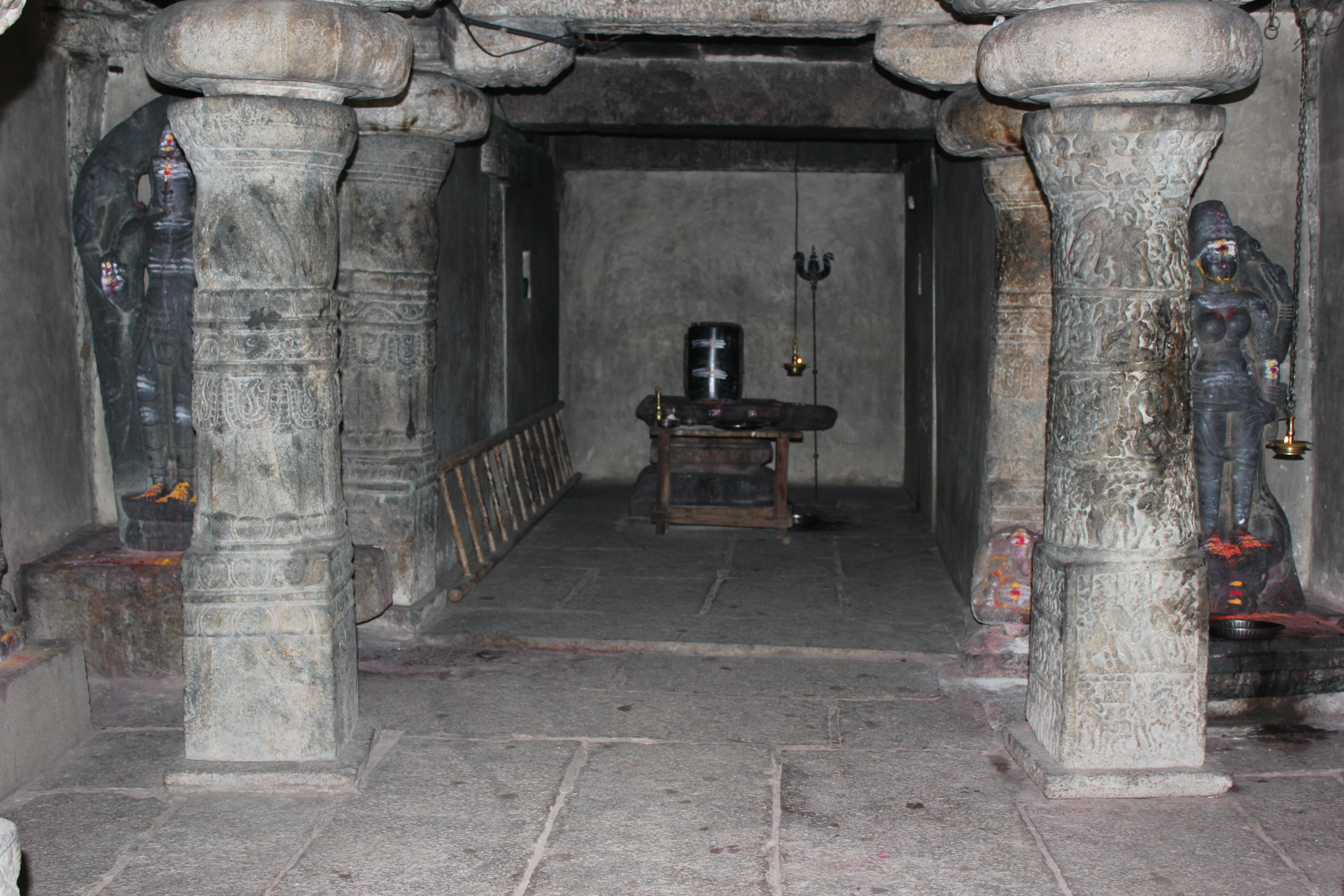
Closed mahamantapa with circular pillars with bas-relief depictions of battle scenes

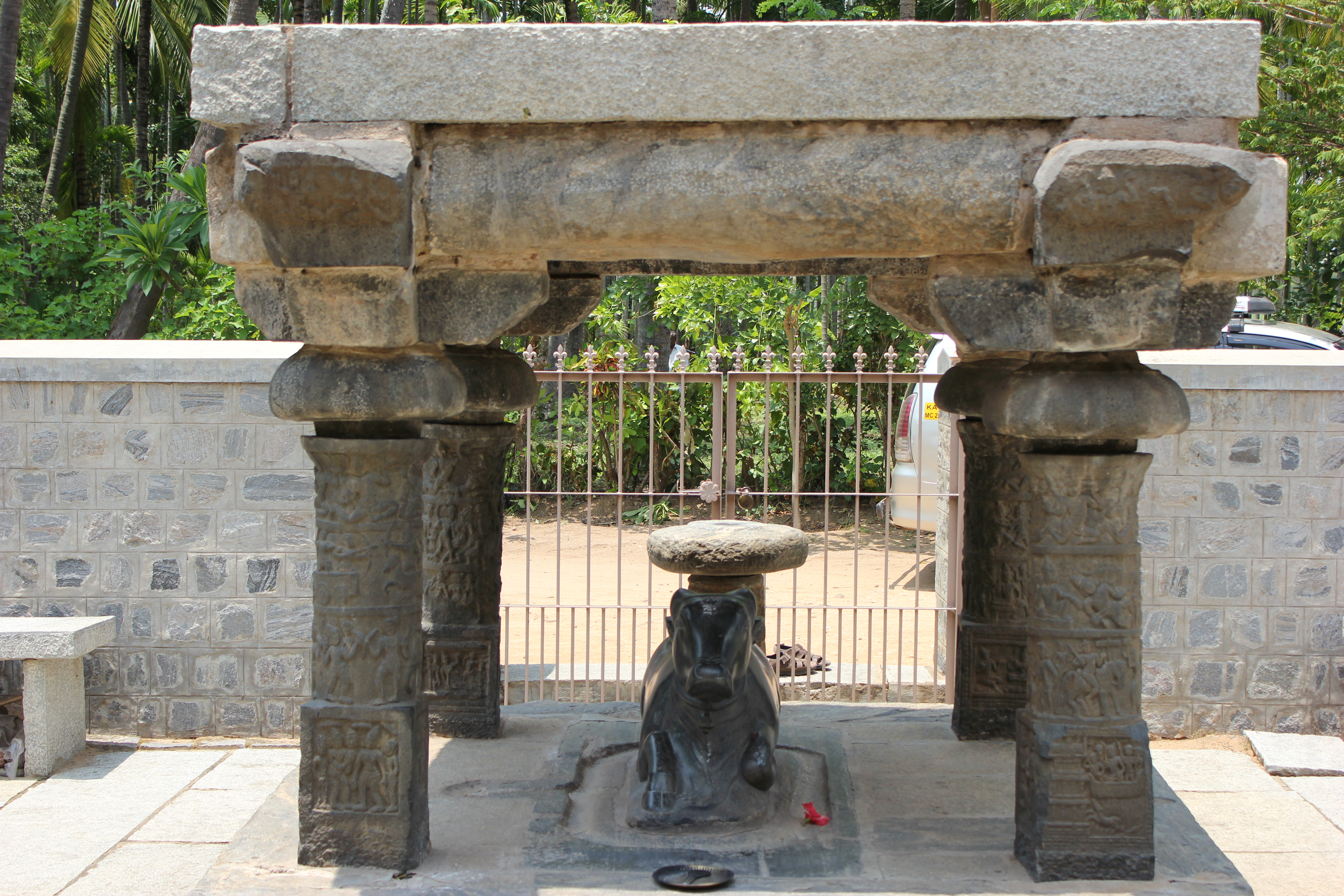
Open nandimantapa with circular pillars with bas-relief depictions of battle scenes

The Arakeshvara Temple, dedicated to the Hindu god Shiva, is located in the village of Hole Alur in the Chamarajanagar district of Karnataka state, India. According to the historian Sarma, the temple which dates back to the middle of the 10th century rule of the Western Ganga Dynasty appears to have been renovated in later periods. It was constructed by King Butuga II around 949 A.D. to celebrate his victory over the Cholas of Tanjore in the historically important battle of Takkolam. It was a military engagement between crown prince Rajaditya, son of the Chola King Parantaka I, and King Butaga II (a powerful vassal of the Rashtrakuta emperor Krishna III). The temple is protected as a monument of national importance by the central Archaeological Survey of India.

== Temple plan ==
The temple has a simple plan characteristic of Western Ganga constructions. It has a sanctum (garbhagriha), a vestibule (called sukhanasi) that connects to the sanctum a large well sculptured closed hall (navaranga or mahamantapa) and an open, elevated and detached mantapa outside facing the shrine containing the sculptured image of nandi (the companion of the Hindu god Shiva) facing east (called the nandimantapa). The base on which the temple is raised (called adhishthana) is a simple set of moldings.

The overall decoration is simple with dancing celestial maiden (apsaras) within volutes of scrolls (lata-patra, lit, "creeper leaf") which extend over the door jamb and linel. On either side of the entrance doorway are two tall rectangular vertical slabs reaching up to the lintel, divided into four panels with relief friezes depicting male drummers (called dola-nritya). The top panel has rustic male dancers who appear to dance to a musicians' ensemble who play the drum, violin, rudra veena, flute and the kanjira. According to the historian Sarma, in no contemporary temple are such native (desi) forms of dance depicted. The most interesting bas-relief sculptures in the temple, according to Sarma, are the ones on the rounded pillars in the nandimantapa and the closed mahamantapa. These relief vividly depict the victory of Butaga II over the Chola prince Rajaditya, in addition to themes from the Hindu epics, mythical figures and demi-gods. The high point of the relief work, in the closed mahamantapa is the ashtadikpalaka grid ("guardians of eight directions") in the ceiling with a central dancing Shiva (called natya shiva). There are several independent sculptures in the closed hall, including Mahishasuramardini (version of the goddess Durga slaying an asura), Yago Dakshinamurthy (god Shiva as "the teacher"), Saptamatrika (seven celestial mothers) and other sculptures that adhere to the 8th-9th century Ganga-Chalukya sculptural idiom.

== Gallery ==
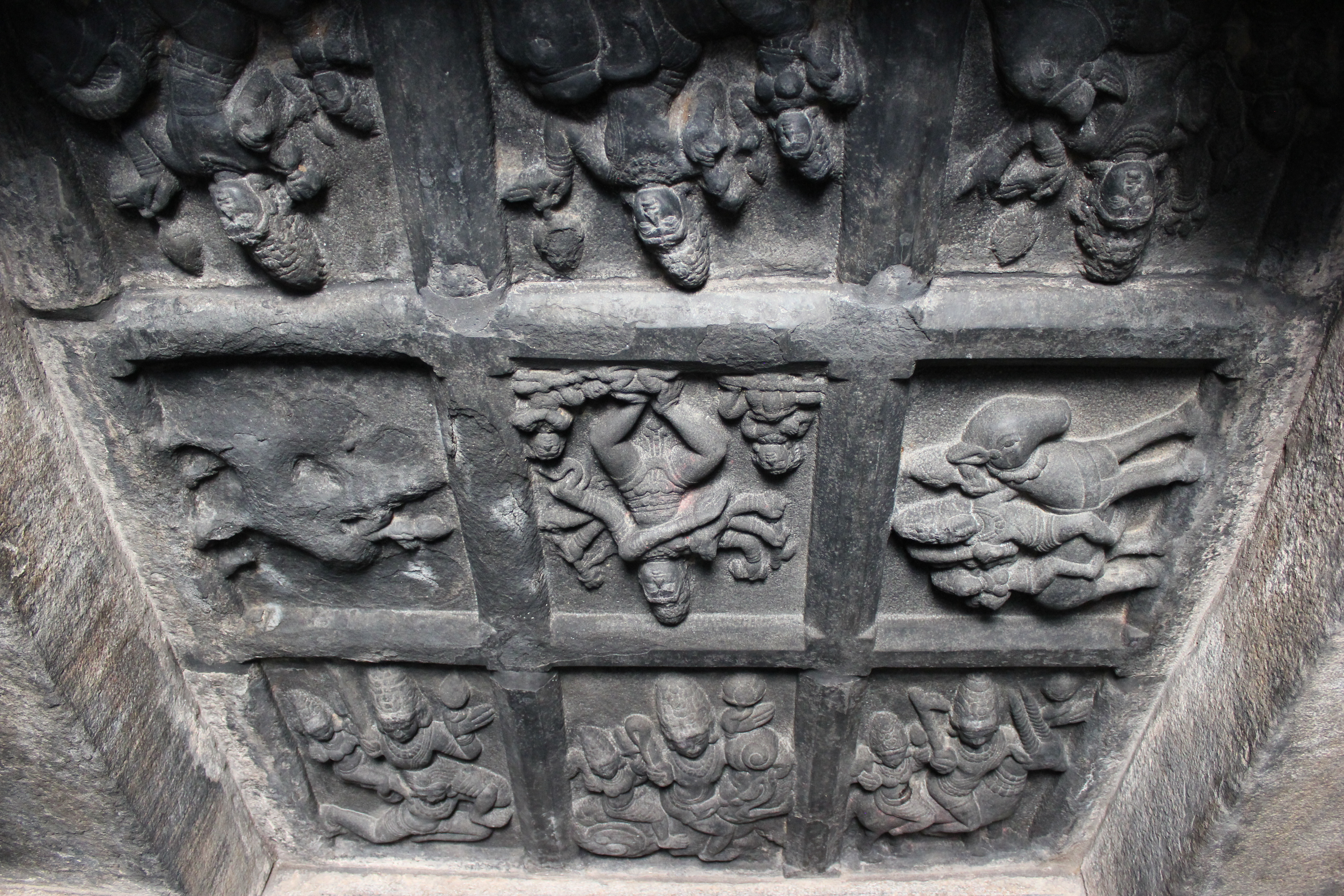
"Guardians of eight directions" in relief on mahamantapa ceiling in Arakeshvara temple at Hole Alur

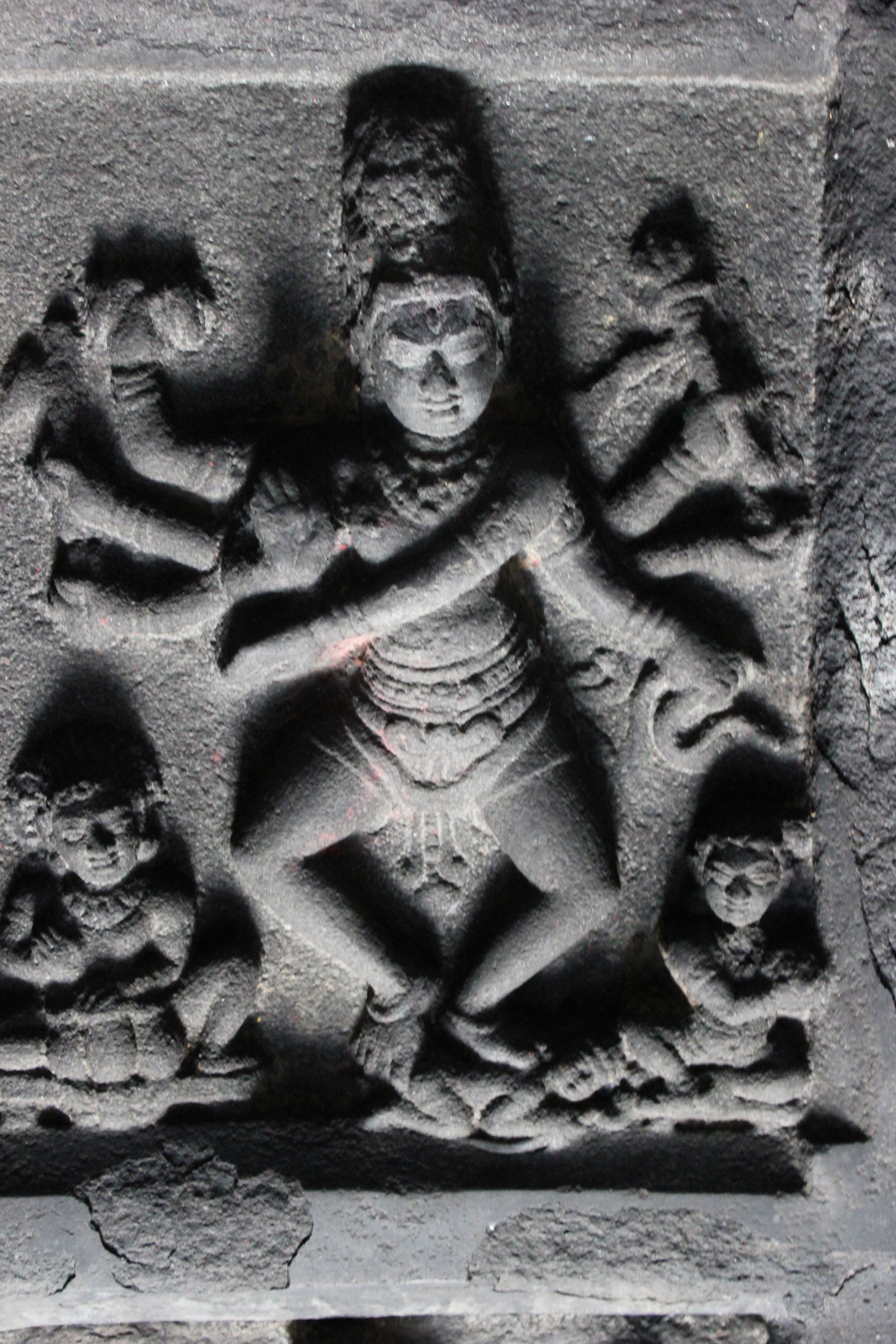
Natya Shiva (dancing Shiva) depiction on ceiling in Arakeshvara temple at Hole Alur

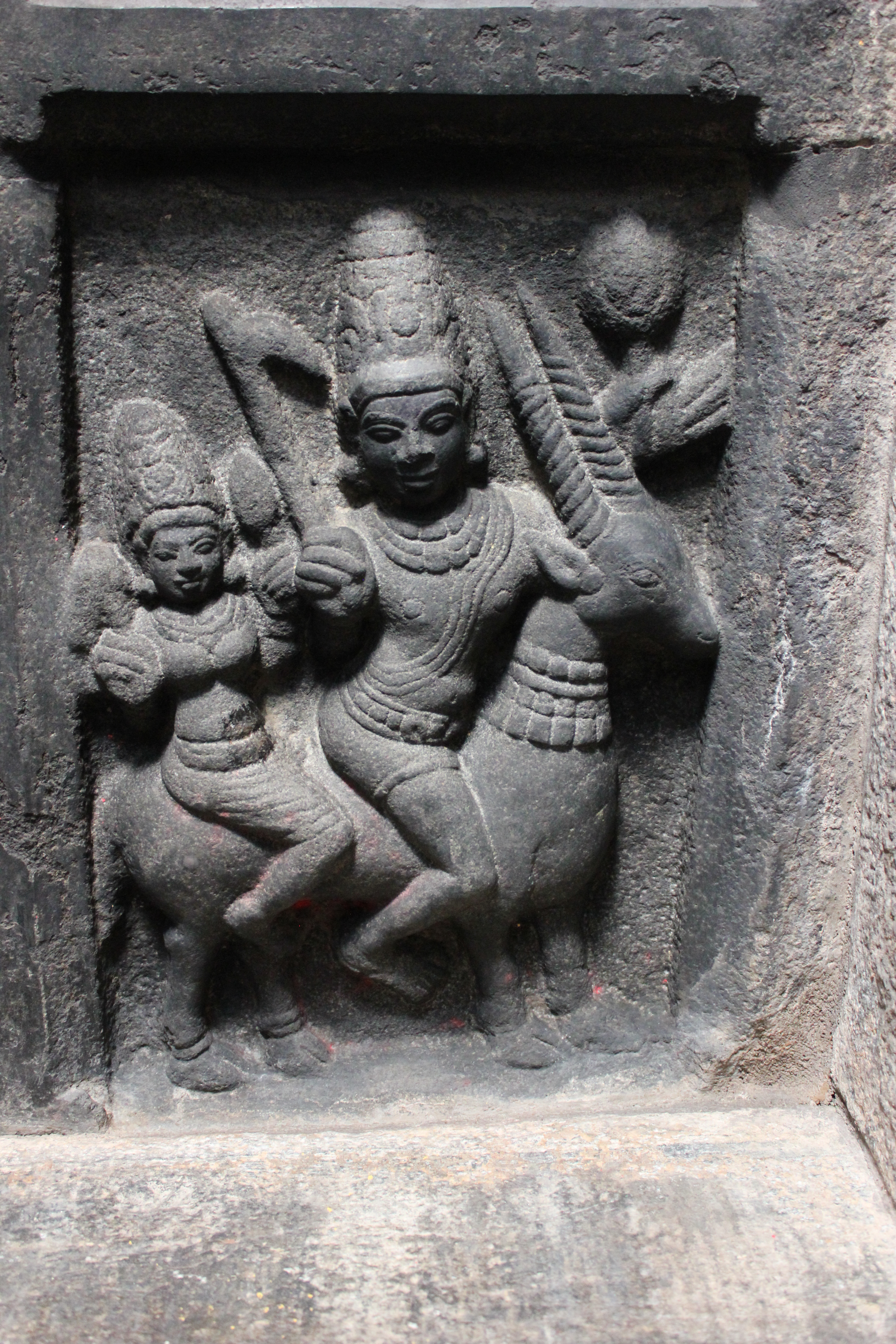
A "guardian" (dikpala) on the ceiling in Arakeshvara temple at Hole Alur

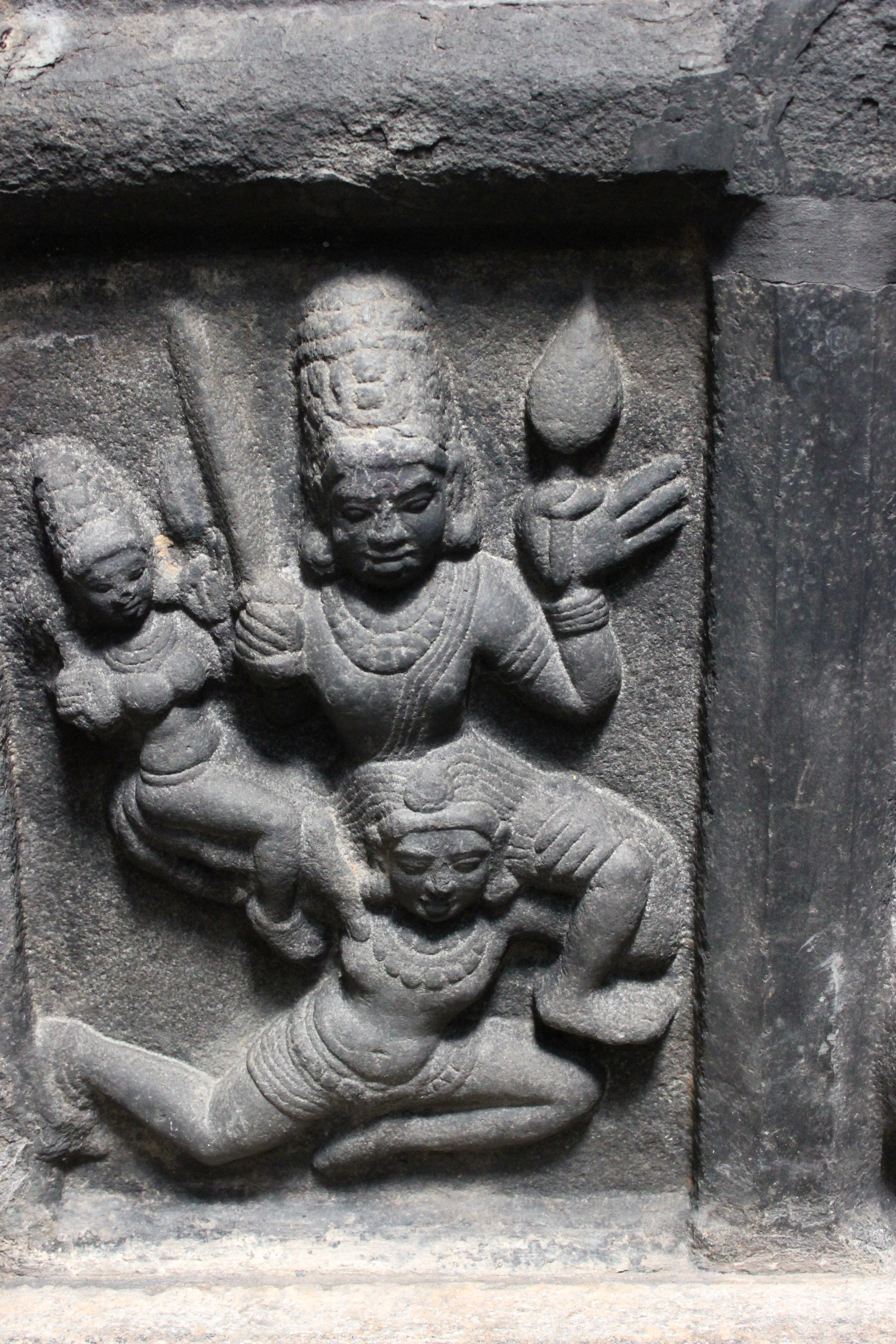
A "guardian" on the ceiling in Arakeshvara temple at Hole Alur

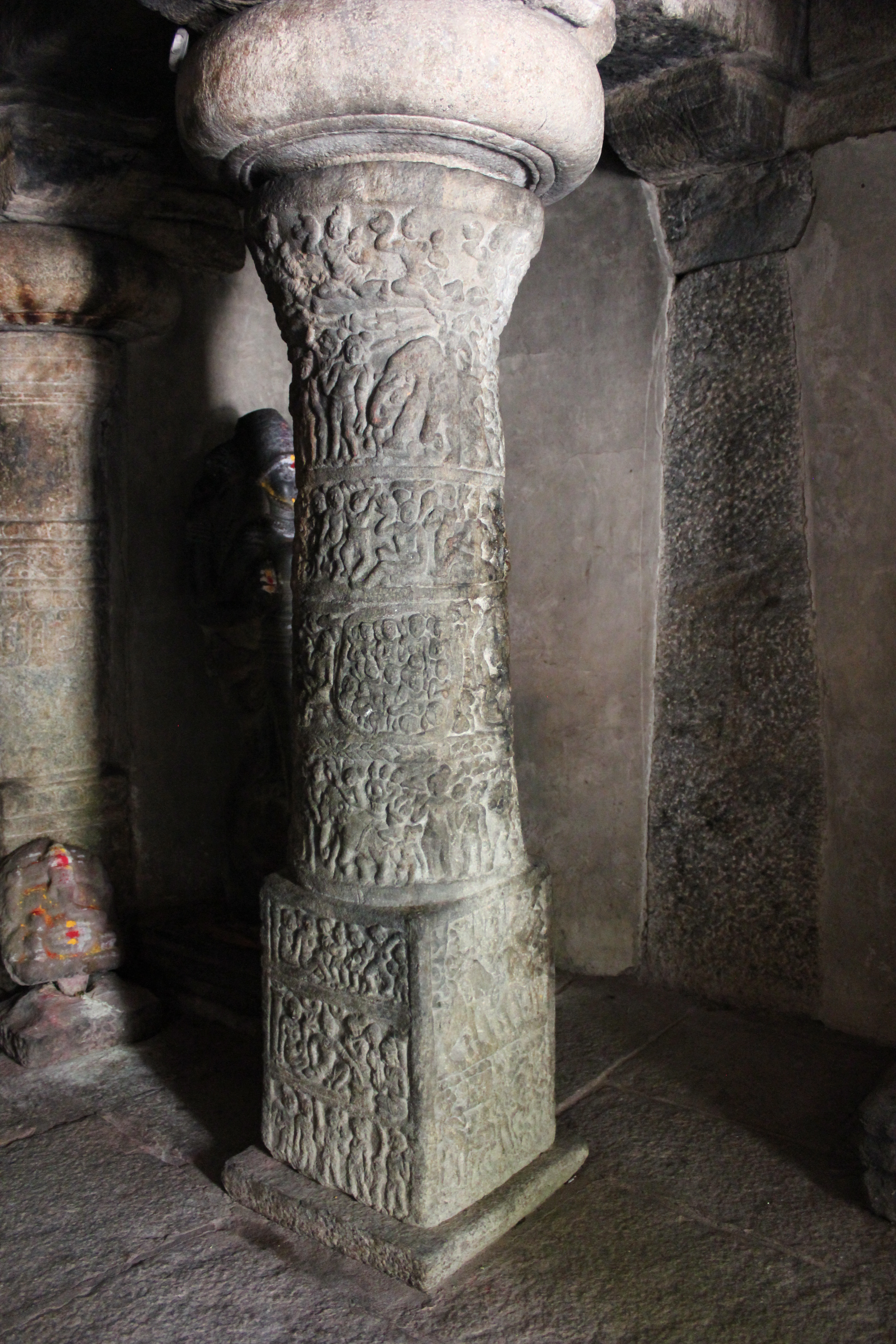
mantapa pillar with intricate bas-relief in the Arakeshwara temple at Hole Alur

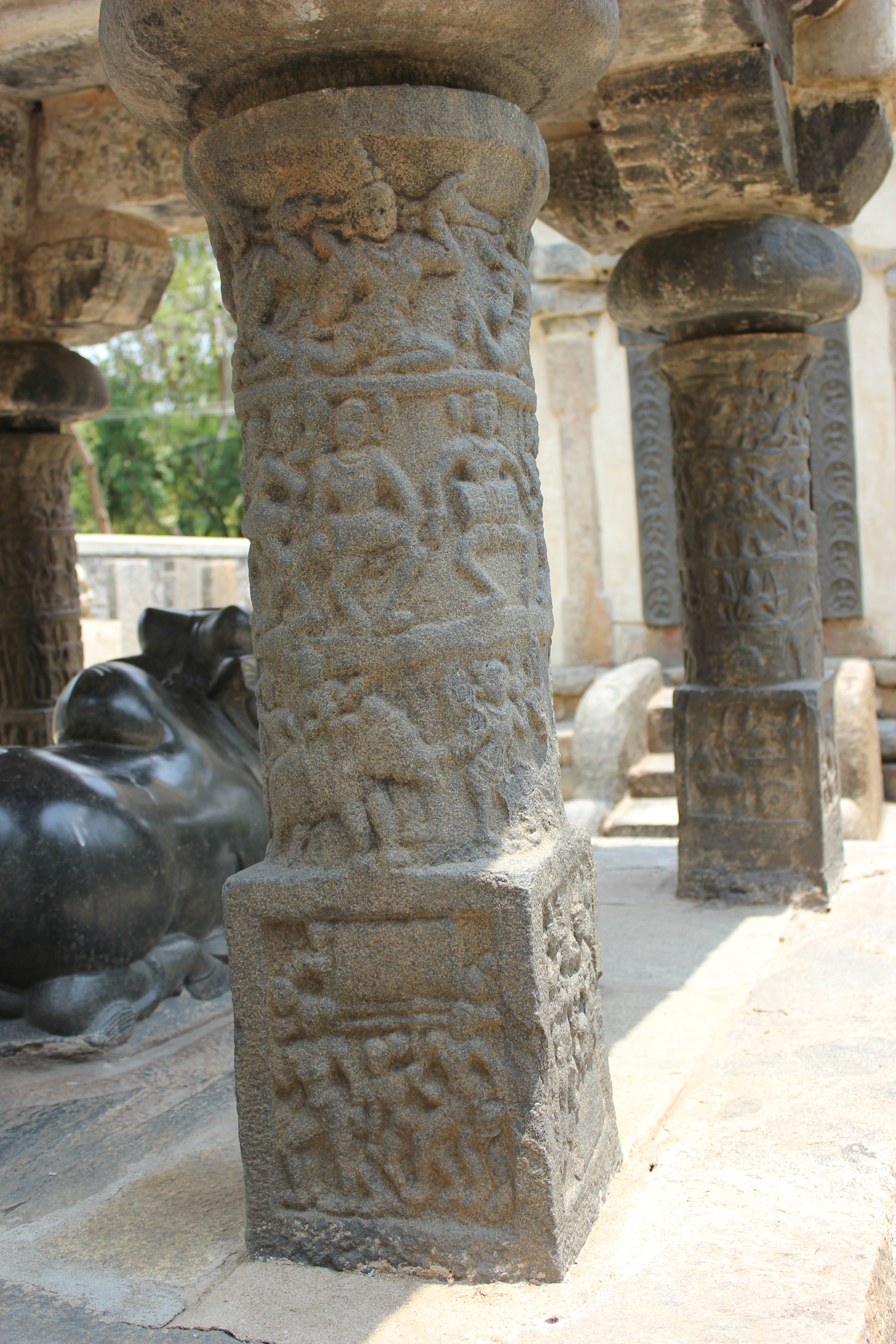
Nandi mantapa pillar with depictions from the battle of Takkolam in relief in the Arakeshwara temple at Hole Alur

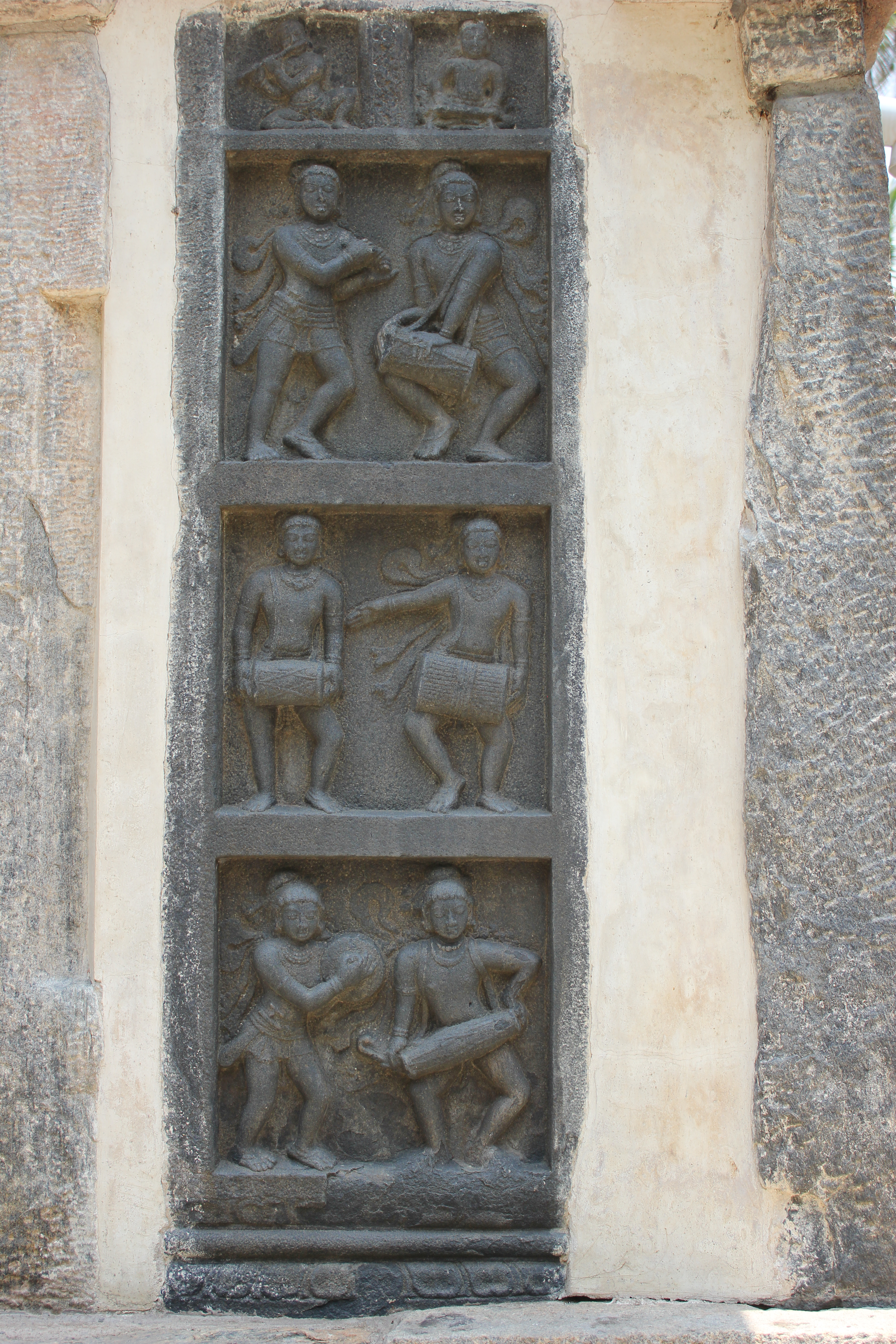
Musicians in relief on vertical slab in the Arakeshwara temple at Hole Alur

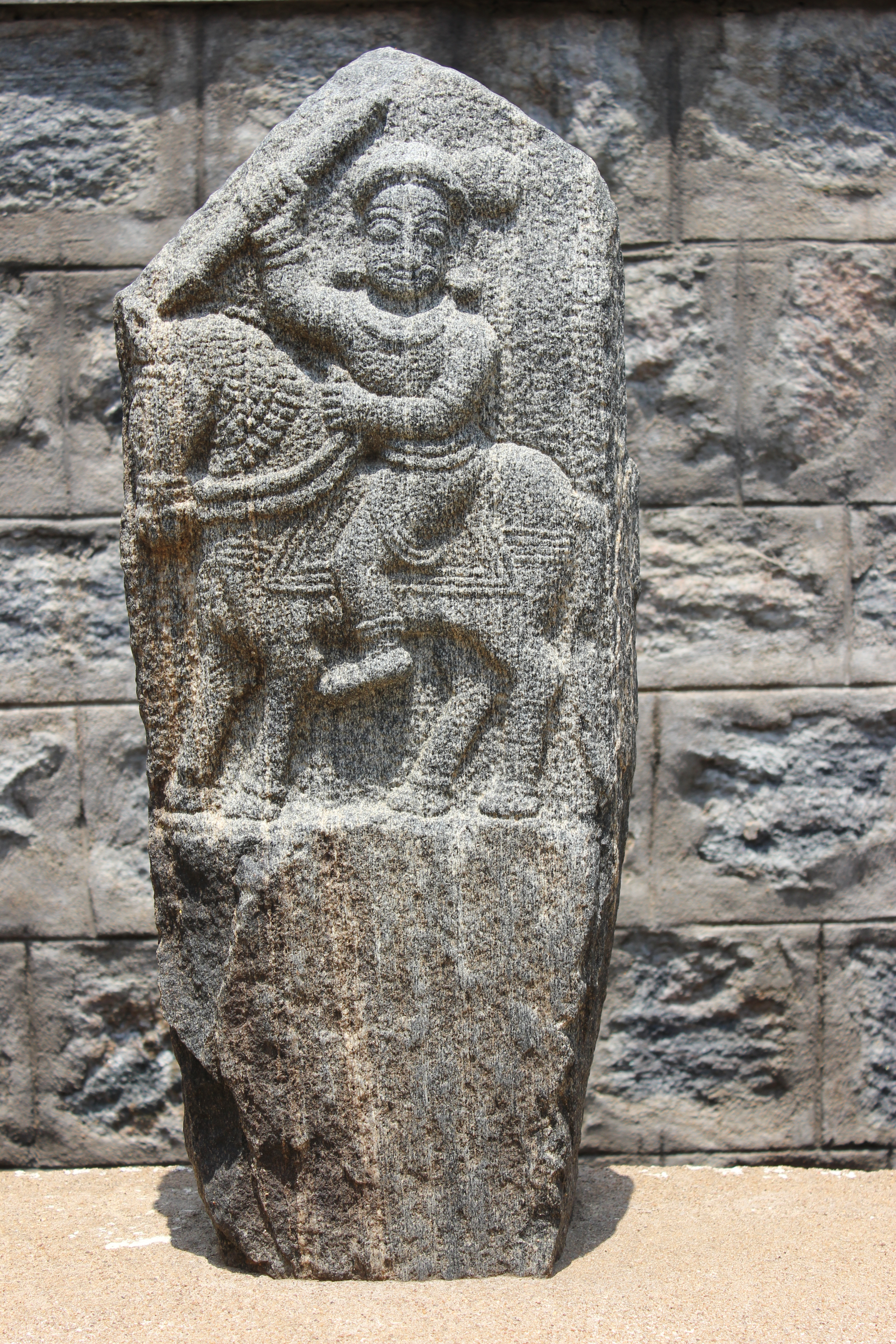
Hero stone with relief sculpture in the Arakeshwara temple at Hole Alur

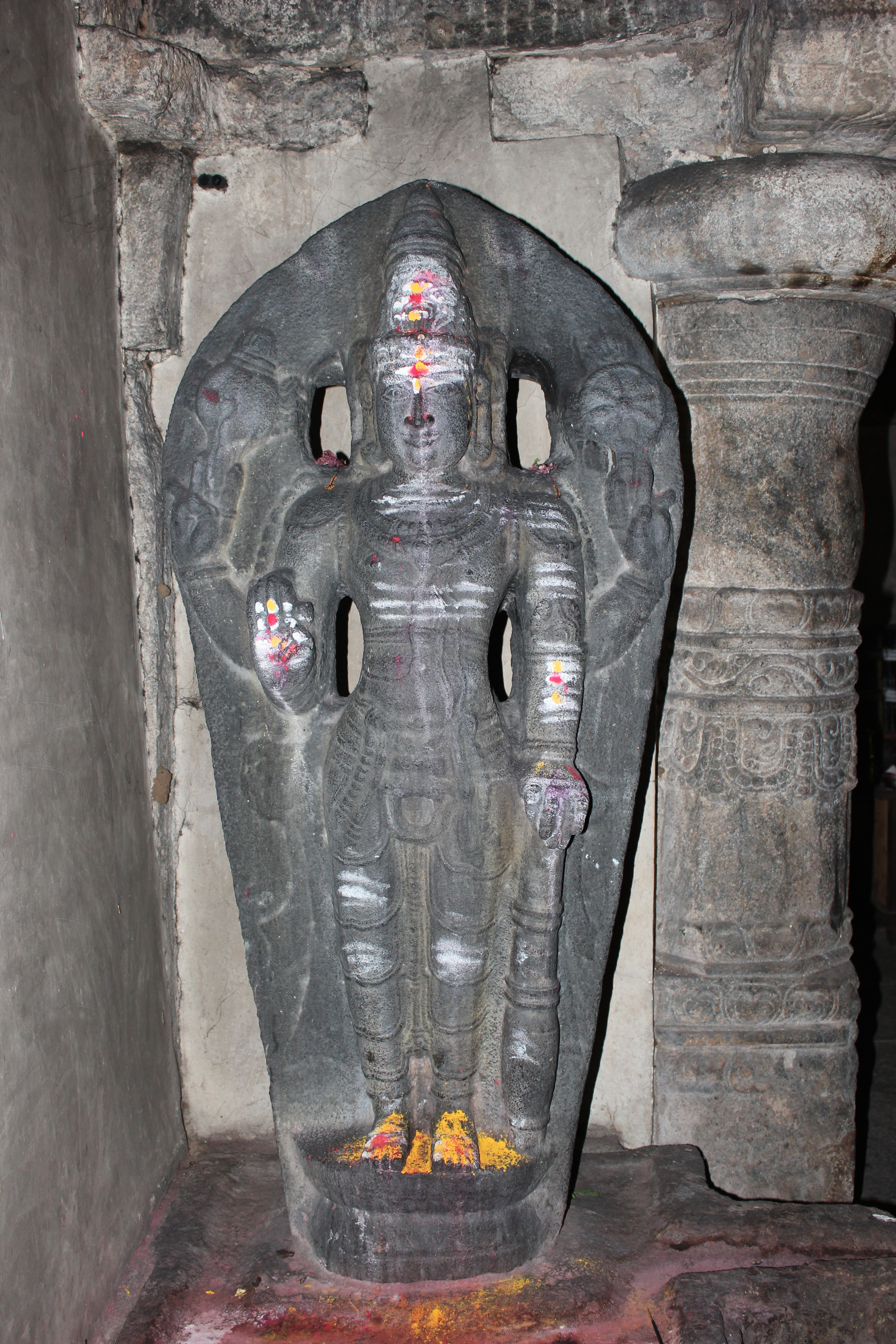
Dakshinamurthy in the Arakeshwara temple at Hole Alur

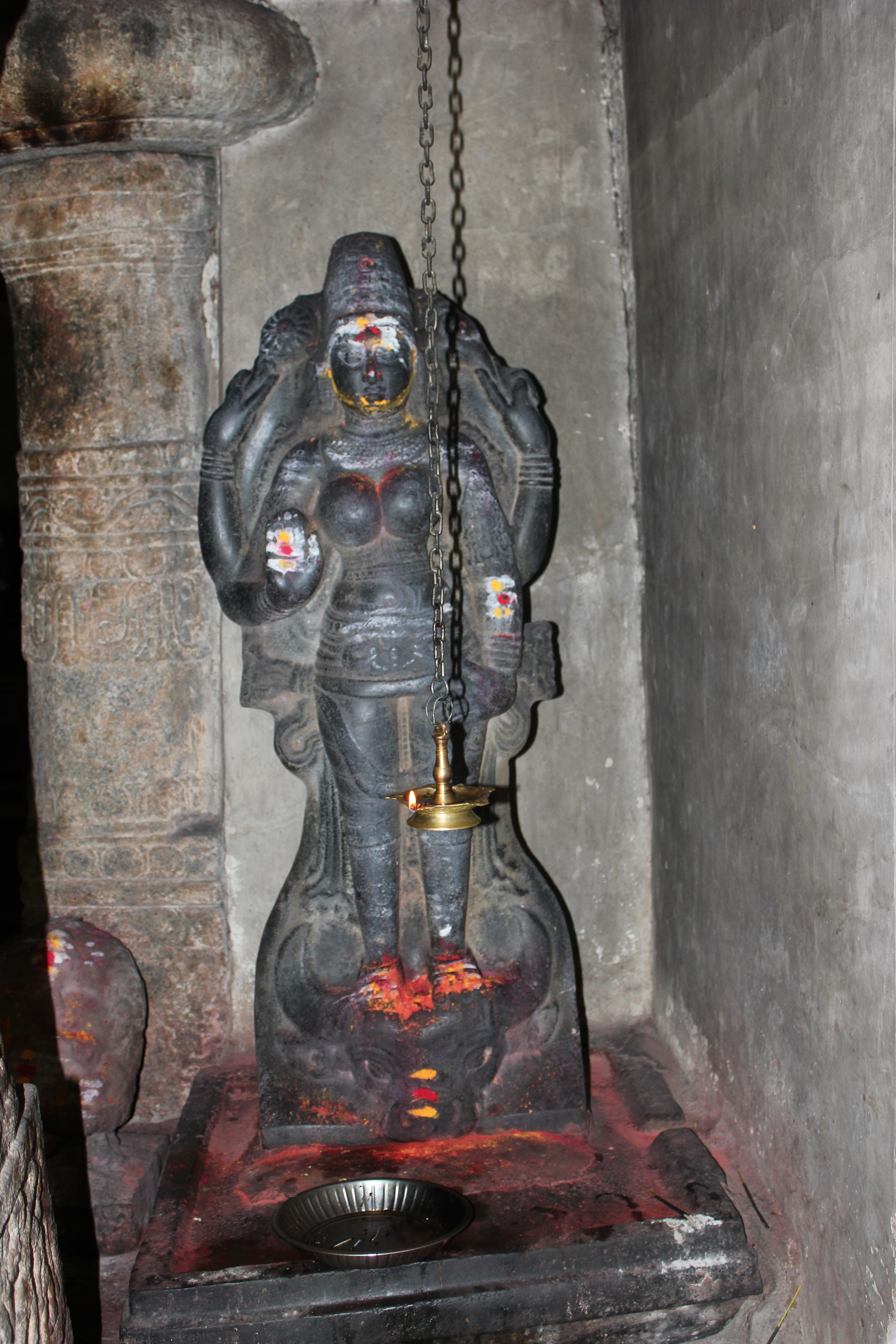
Mahishasuramardini in the Arakeshwara temple at Hole Alur

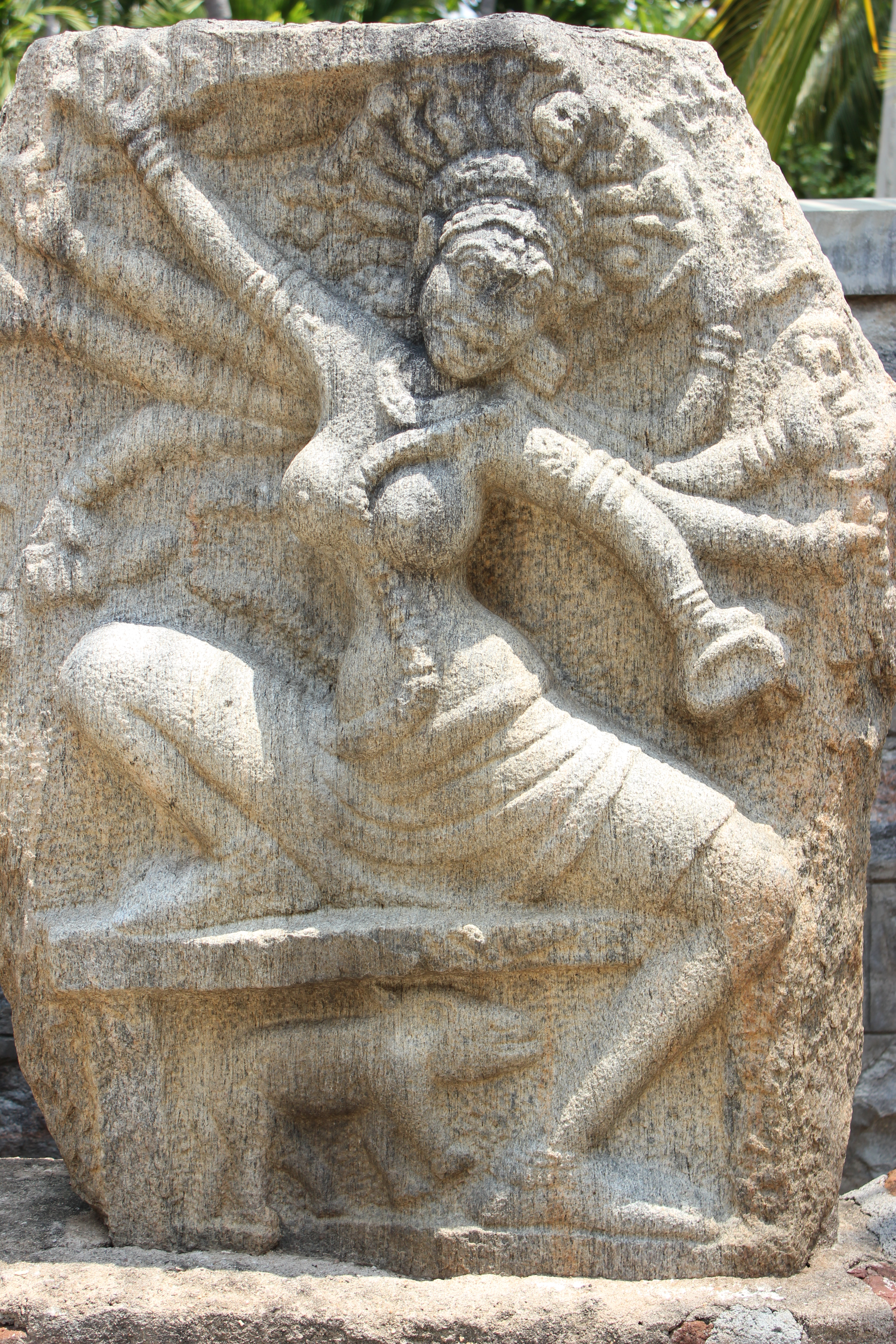
Deity sculpture in relief in the Arakeshwara temple at Hole Alur

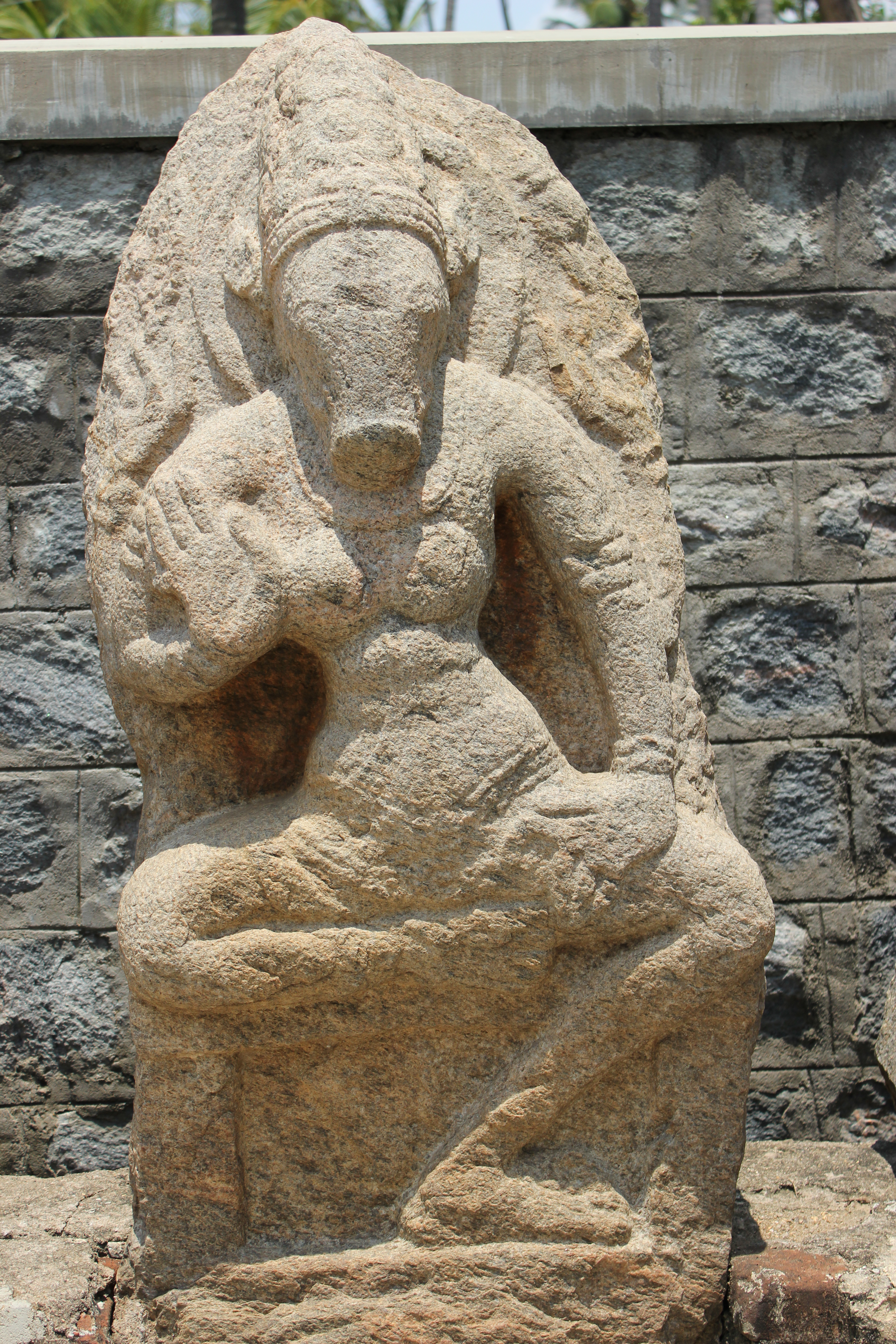
Varaha in relief in the Arakeshwara temple at Hole Alur
