= Kosta (architectural feature) =

Wall

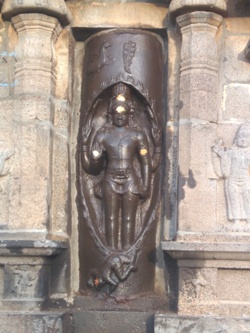
Lingodbhava in kosta in Karkodeswarar Temple in Ariyalur district of Tamil Nadu

Kosta also known as devakoshta, is the outer wall found around the garbhagriha or inner sanctum in the Hindu temples. In this kosta, deities are set up as per Agama (Hinduism) tradition.

In Shiva temples, sculptures such as Nartana Vinayaka, Dakshinamurthy, Vishnu, Lingodbhava, Brahma Vishnu Durga are set up. The komugi through which abisega water which comes out from the sanctum sanctorum is also found here. During the period of kings, in granite temples so many other sculptures are found. The kosta found in the Siva temple is known as Shiva kosta and Shivalaya kosta.

== Sakthi temples ==
In Sakthi temples also known as Amman temples Brahmi, Vaishnavi and other sculptures are found.
