= Balambika =

Hindu goddess

Balambika (Deity) (also known as "Bala") is a goddess of the Hindu religion, usually found in South India. Her name means "Goddess Of Knowledge", or "Child Goddess".

Balambika's description appears in her sacred text the Balambika Dasakam. She is also pictured as having four arms and a red circle on each palm. She holds a sacred textbook and a japamala with two of her arms. Balambika is considered a child, and acts as one, but is said to bring true knowledge, education, wisdom, power and prosperity for a better life. She is sometimes called the goddess of children, and therefore, her temple was constructed to be devoted to children.

== Moolamantram ==
“Aiym Kleem Sow. Sow, Kleem, Aiym. Aiym, Kleem, Sow."

"Aiym" stands for learning.

"Kleem" stands for magnetic attraction.

"Sow" stands for prosperity.

This simple three word moolamantram is considered to be the solution to all modern worldly problems. When you chant this moolamantram, Balambika is said to instantly be around you. When you recite her name, "Bala," she will be listening to what you say at all times.

== Temple ==
Balambika has a temple in Kamarasavalli in Ariyalur district of Tamil Nadu. It is around 1000–2000 years old. There are sculptures on the walls that show the story of Karkodga performing Shiva Puja (Worship of God Shiva) with Lord Vinayaka and Nandi. It is said that people of the Cancer zodiac sign should pray here for relief.

Festivals celebrated:

Festival	Time
Pradoshams	Monthly
Tamil New Years Day	April 14
Aadi Pooram	July–August
Vinayaka Chaturthi	August–September
Navarathri	September–October
Aipasi Annabishekam	October–November
Margazhi Tiruvadhirai	December–January

== Sacred text ==
Her sacred text that describes her is called the Balambika Dasakam. This text uses the phrase "Who is" or "Whose is" to describe Balambika or what she has. Every line also begins with "Please shower a merciful glance at me, Oh Balambika." Originally written in Sanskrit, it was translated below by P.R.Ramachander:

1.Velathi langya karune vibhudhendra vandhye, Leela vinirmitha charachara hrun nivase, Mala kirreeta mani kundala madithange, Balambike mai nidehi Krupakadaksham.

Please shower a merciful glance at me, Oh Balambika, Who is blessed with limitless mercy and saluted by the Lord of heaven, Who lives in the heart of moving and non moving things, who weremade by her as a sport, And who is decorated by garlands, crown and gem studded ear globes.

2.Kanjasanadhi mani manju kireeta koti, Prathyuptha rathna ruchiranchitha pada padme, Manjeera manjula vinirjitha hamsa naadhe, Balambike mai nidehi Krupakadaksham.

Please shower a merciful glance at me, Oh Balambika, Who sits on a golden throne and wears a crown studded with billions of gems, And wears on her very pretty lotus like feet, Anklets filled with gems making a sound, which is better than the swan song.

3.Praaleya bhanu kalikaa kalithathi ramye, Padagra javali vinirjitha moukthikabhe, Praneswari pramadha loka pathe pragadbhe, Balambike mai nidehi Krupakadaksham.

Please shower a merciful glance at me, Oh Balambika, Whose is prettier than the snow, the moon and the flower bud, Whose anklets emit a shine which beats the luster of pearls, Who is the expert and who is the queen of the king of Pramadhas.

4.Jangadhibhir vijitha chithaja thooni bhage, Rambhadhi mardhava kareendra karoru yugme, Shampa shathadhika sammujwala chela leele, Balambike mai nidehi Krupakadaksham.

Please shower a merciful glance at me, Oh Balambika, Whose shanks are like the arrows starting from the quiver, Whose thighs are like the elephants trunk and beat in prettiness Rambha and other damsels, And whose attire is hundred times more resplendent than lightning.

5.Manikhya maulika vinirmitha mekhaladye, Maya vilagna vilasan mani patta bandhe, Lolambaraji vilasan nava roma jale, Balambike mai nidehi Krupakadaksham.

Please shower a merciful glance at me, Oh Balambika, Who wears a girdle made of top quality rubies, Who shines in a mind entangling and has in her head gear made of jewels, Who shines in loose cloths and has new magical growth of hair.

6.Nyagrodha pallava thalodhara nimna naabhe, Nirdhootha haara vilasad kucha chakravake, Nishkaadhi manju mani bhooshana bhooshithange, Balambike mai nidehi Krupakadaksham.

Please shower a merciful glance at me, Oh Balambika, Who has got a sunken navel, which appears like the river of sprouts of Banyan tree, Who has shining and moving garlands over her pretty breasts. And who wears ornaments of gold and gems over her body.

7.Kandharpa chapa madha banga kruthadhi ramye, Broo vallari vividha cheshtitha ramya maane, Kandharpa sodhara samakruthi phaladese, Balambike mai nidehi Krupakadaksham.

Please shower a merciful glance at me, Oh Balambika, Who is so pretty that she defeats the pride of the bow of God of love, Who quivers her eye brows in a very pretty manner, And whose forehead has a form which makes one conclude that it is brother of God of love.

8.Mukthavali vilasa dhoorjitha kambhu kande, Mandasamithanana vinijitha chandra Bimbe, Bhaktheshta dhana niratha amrutha poorna drushte Balambike mai nidehi Krupakadaksham.

Please shower a merciful glance at me, Oh Balambika, Whose pretty conch shaped neck and wears a gem studded necklace, Who wins with her pretty gentle smile on her moon like face, And who has a look full of nectar which satisfies the wishes of devotees.

9.Karnaa vilambi mani kundala ganda bhage, Karnaantha deerga nava neeraja pathra nethre, Swarnaaya khadhi guna moukthika shobhi naase, Balambike mai nidehi Krupakadaksham.

Please shower a merciful glance at me, Oh Balambika, Whose gem studded ear stud hangs up to her neck, Who has a lotus leaf like eye extending up to the ears, And whose nose shines with a stud of pure gold and gem.

10.Lolaamba raji lalitha alaka jhala shobhe, Malli naveena kalika nava kundha jale, Balendu manjula kireeta virajamaane, Balambike mai nidehi Krupakadaksham.

Please shower a merciful glance at me, Oh Balambika, Who shines with her pretty dangling hair and her dress, Whose hair is decorated with new buds of jasmine, And who shines with a crown decorated with a crescent.

11.Balambike Maha Rajni Vaidyanatha priyeswari, Pahi maam amba kripayaa thwath padam saranam gatha.

Oh great queen Balambika, the darling of Vaidyanatha, Oh mother be kind enough to protect me, Who has taken refuge at your feet.
