= Kuddigam =

- Village
- Interactive map of Kuddigam
- Location in Andhra Pradesh, India
- Country: India
- State: Andhra Pradesh
- District: Srikakulam district

Population 1300
  - Total: 1,300
  - Density: 1,300/km^{2} (3,400/sq mi)

Languages
  - Official: Telugu
- Time zone: UTC+5:30 (IST)
- 532457PIN -->: 532457
- Vehicle registration: AP Sarpanch. =Nelli Amrutha

Kuddigam is a village in Kotturu mandal, located in Srikakulam district of Andhra Pradesh, India.
