= Ponsei-Kidarankondan =

Village in Tamil Nadu, India

திருநனிபள்ளி(Ponsei)
- Location in Tamil Nadu

Religion
- Affiliation: Hinduism
- District: Mayiladuthurai

Location
- Location: Kidarankondan
- State: Tamil Nadu
- Country: India
- Coordinates: 11°7′47.3268″N 79°45′52.4226″E

Ponsei Thirunanipalli is one of the villages of Kidarankondan panchayat. It is located in Mayiladuthurai district and state of Tamil Nadu, under Poompuhar Assembly Constituency and Mayiladuthurai parliamentary Constituency.

Pincode-609304

The population is nearly 1500.

== Nearby notable places ==
1. Poombuhar
2. Thirunallar-Sannishwaran Temple-Saturn Planet
3. Fort Dansborg-Tharangambadi
4. Mayiladuthurai
5. Chidambaram-Natarajar Temple World's Center Point
6. திருநனிபள்ளி Ponsei Natrunaiyappar Temple
7. kizhapaerambalam-Kethu Temple
8. Thiruvengadu Buthan Temple-Mercury Planet
9. Vaitheeshwaran Temple-Chevvai Temple-Earth Mars
