= Lingodbhava =

Hindu representation of the god Shiva

- Concealment & Revelation
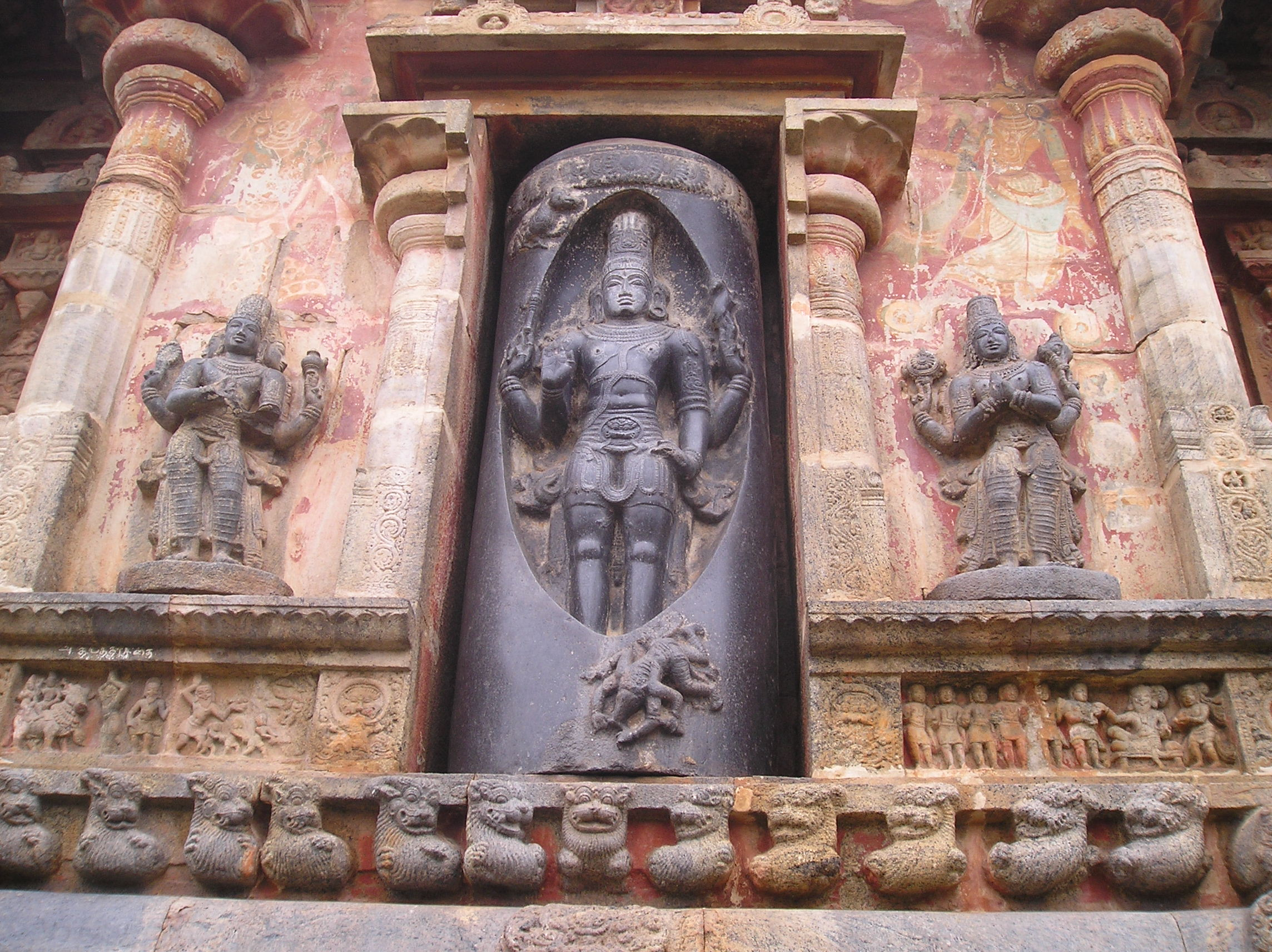
- Iconography of lingodbhava with Brahma (left), Shiva (centre), and Vishnu (right) in the Airavatesvara Temple at Darasuram, 10th century CE
- Devanagari: लिंगोद्भव
- Sanskrit transliteration: Lingodbhava
- Tamil: லிங்கோத்பவா
- Affiliation: Paramashiva, Sadashiva
- Texts: Niśvāsamukha, Vayu, Skanda, Brahmanda, Kurma, Linga, Vamana, Brahma, Padma, Devi Bhagavata, Shiva Purana
- Region: South India, Odisha

Lingōdbhava (also called Lingobhava, the "emergence of the Linga") is an iconic representation of the Hindu god Shiva, commonly seen in temples in Tamil Nadu.

The iconography of Lingodbhava represents Shiva emerging out of the pillar of light, with smaller images of Vishnu in the form of a boar in the bottom and Brahma in the form of a gander at the top. The icon depicts the legend of the origin of the linga, Shiva's aniconic representation, often featured in his worship. The tale of Lingodbhava is found in various Puranas, and is regarded to be an assimilation the old cults of pillar-veneration.

The earliest literary evidence of the iconic representation is found in the 7th century works of the Shaiva saints Appar and Sambandar. The other indicative mention is found in the Tirukkural, a c. 5th-century Tamil text.

== Legend ==
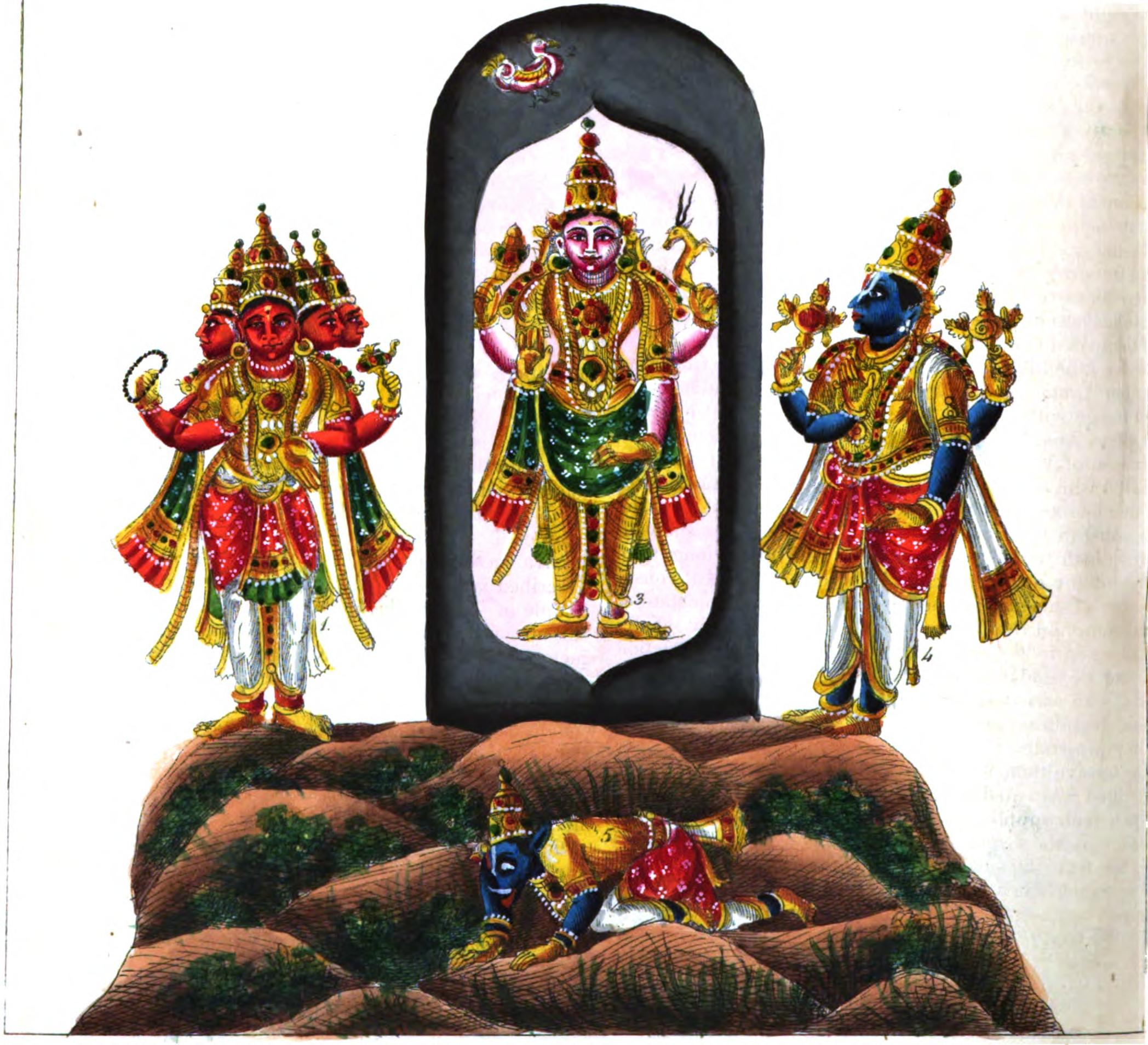
Picture depicting the legend

In a Shaiva legend, the deities Vishnu and Brahma once engaged in a debate regarding their superiority. To resolve the debate, Shiva appeared as a massive pillar of light, and challenged them to find his source. Brahma took the form of a gander, and flew to the sky to see the top of the flame, while Vishnu became the boar Varaha, and sought its base. This scene is called the Lingodbhava and is represented in the western wall at the sanctum of many Shiva temples. Neither Brahma nor Vishnu could find the source, and while Vishnu conceded his defeat, Brahma lied and said he had found the pinnacle. Angered by the latter's dishonesty, Shiva took the form of Bhairava and decapitated one of the five heads of Brahma. Furthermore, in punishment, Shiva ordained that Brahma would never have temples on earth for his worship. As Shiva cut off Brahma's fifth head, he had committed the sin of brahmahatyāpāpa (murder of a Brahmin or an equivalent crime) and had to roam the three worlds as Bhikshatana, a naked beggar, to get absolved of his sin. This sin is finally absolved at Varanasi on the banks of the Ganga river. The legend is detailed in the Vishnu Purana.

== Iconography ==
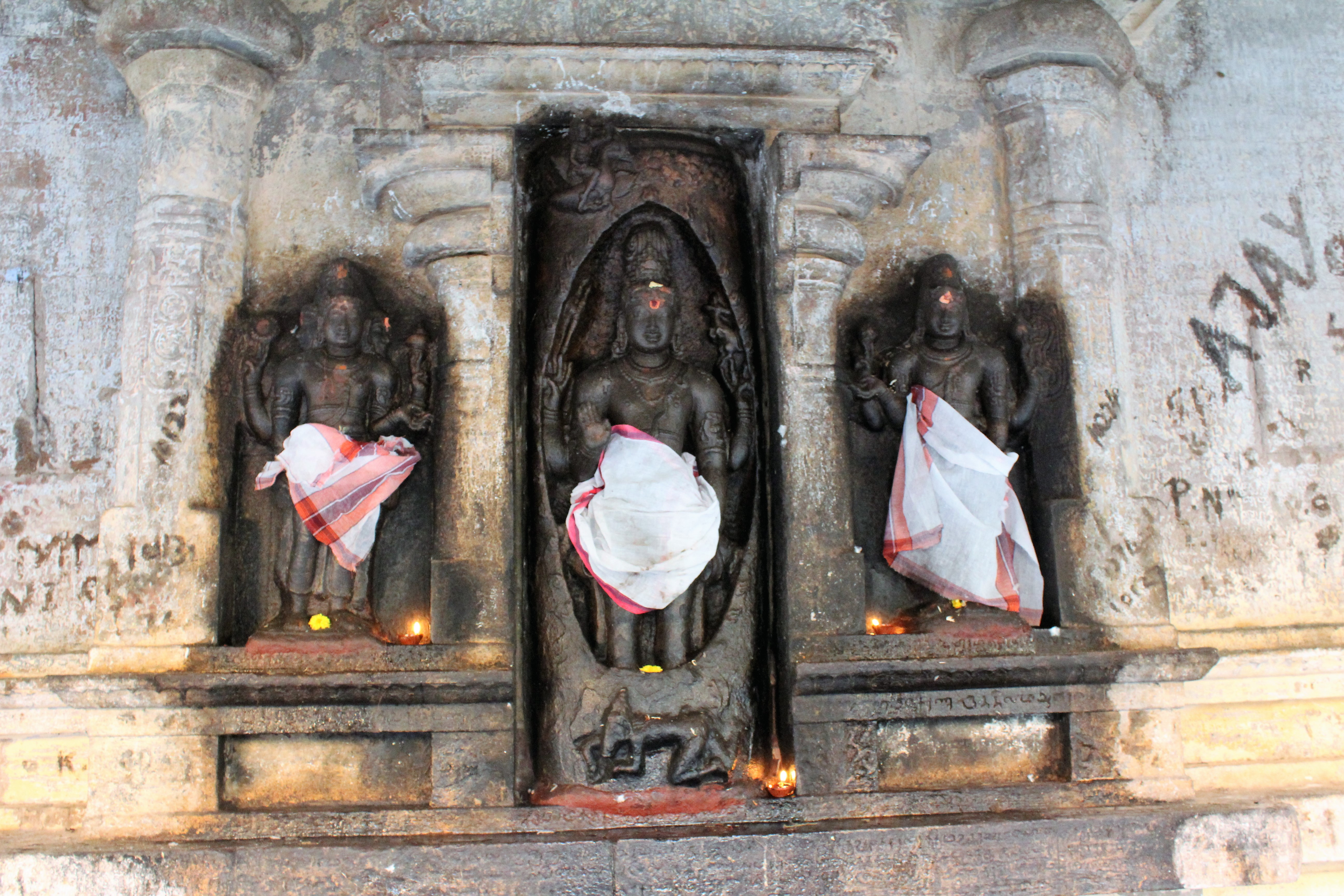
Shiva emerging from the flame with Vishnu on the right and Brahma on the left

The Lingodbhava image can be found in the first precinct around the sanctum in the wall exactly behind the image of Shiva in the central shrine with Vishnu and Brahma in the sides. Lingodbhava or emergence of the Lingam, found in various puranas, augments the synthesis of the old cults of pillar and symbolic worship. The idea emerged from deity residing in a pillar and later visualised as Shiva emerging from the lingam. Shiva is represented in South Indian temples in form of Lingam. The image of Lingothbhava is depicted with Shiva emerging from Linga in his original form. Vishnu in the form of boar is usually depicted in the bottom of the lingam while Brahma in the form of a gander is seen on the top of the lingam. In some temples, Lingothbhava is depicted in this form along with Brahma on the right of the image while Vishnu to the left of Shiva, both worshipping Shiva emerging as a column of fire. Lingobhava along with Dakshinamurthy is considered the most common forms of Shiva in the South Indian temples from Chola times.

== Literary mention ==
Tirukkural, the classic Tamil language couplets has the first mention of Lingothbhava which mentions that Shiva wanted to decide dispute of supremacy between Vishnu and Brahma. Appar, one of the early Shaiva saint of the 7th century, gives evidence of this knowledge of puranic episodes relating to Lingodbhava form of Shiva while Tirugnana Sambandar refers this form of Shiva as the nature of light that could not be comprehended by Brahma and Vishnu. Thiruvathirai festival is celebrated during the Tamil month of Margazhi (December–January) in all Shiva temples when Shiva is believed to have performed the cosmic dance. The same day as per Arunachala Puranam, the literary history of Annamalaiyar Temple, is considered the day when Shiva rose as a column of fire when both Vishnu and Brahma could not find his origin. The living beings in the three worlds could not bear the heat of column and at the request of celestial deities, Shiva cooled down as the mountain Arunachala. The Shivaratri when he cooled down is called the Lingothbhavar day. The day is considered when the genesis of mixture of form and formless manifestation of Shiva.
