= Dakshinamurti =

Aspect of the Hindu god Shiva as a guru

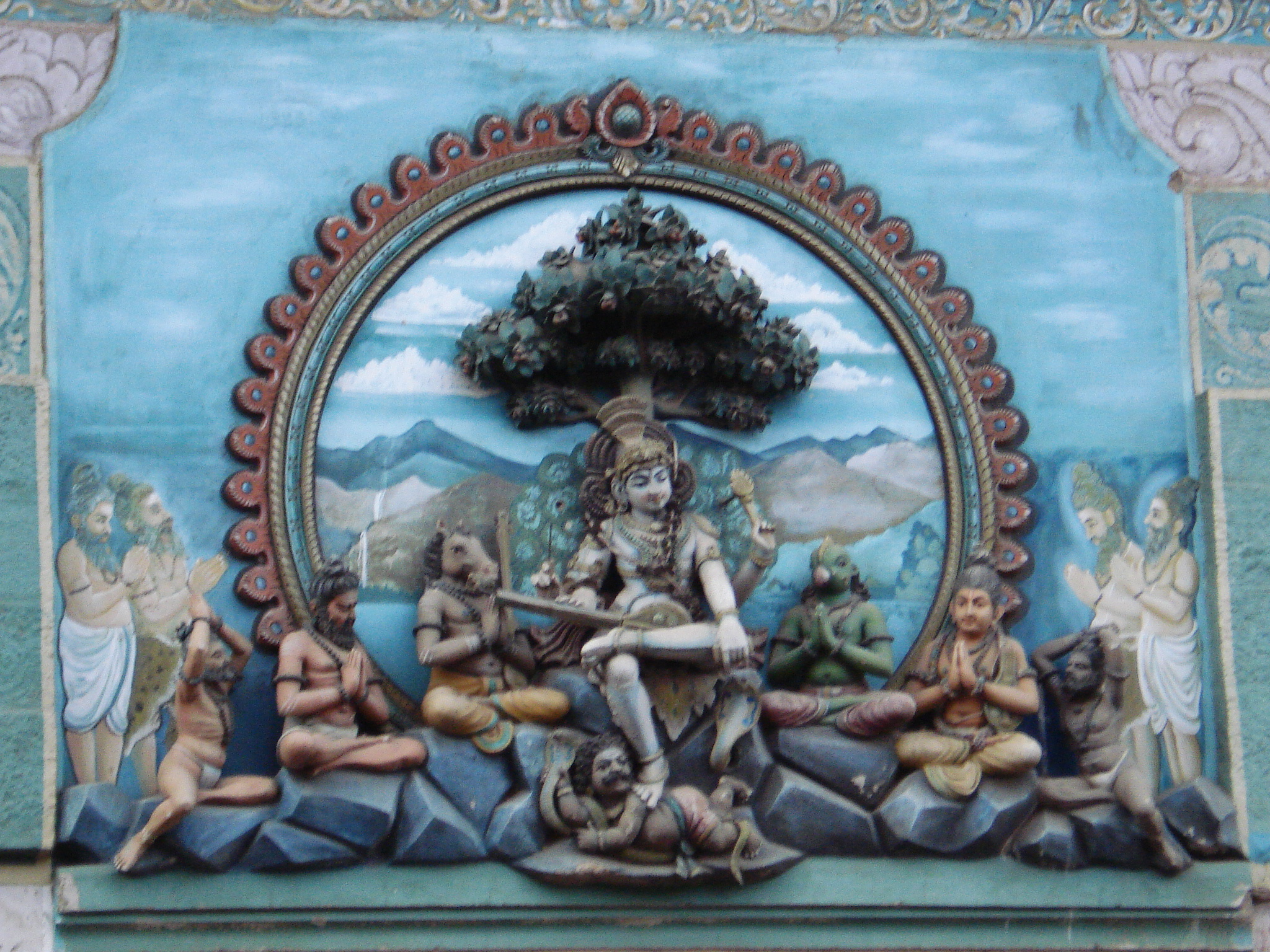
Dakshinamurti sculpture on the southern entrance of the Meenakshi Temple in Madurai.

Dakshinamurti (Sanskrit: दक्षिणामूर्ति, romanized: Dakṣiṇāmūrti) is an aspect of the Hindu god Shiva as a guru (teacher). He is worshipped as the teacher of yoga, music, the Shastras (scriptures), and the god of wisdom.

== Etymology ==
Dakshinamurti literally means "one who is facing south (dakṣiṇa)" in Sanskrit. An alternative derivation links the name to dakṣiṇya, meaning benevolence or kindness, describing Shiva as a teacher imparting wisdom.

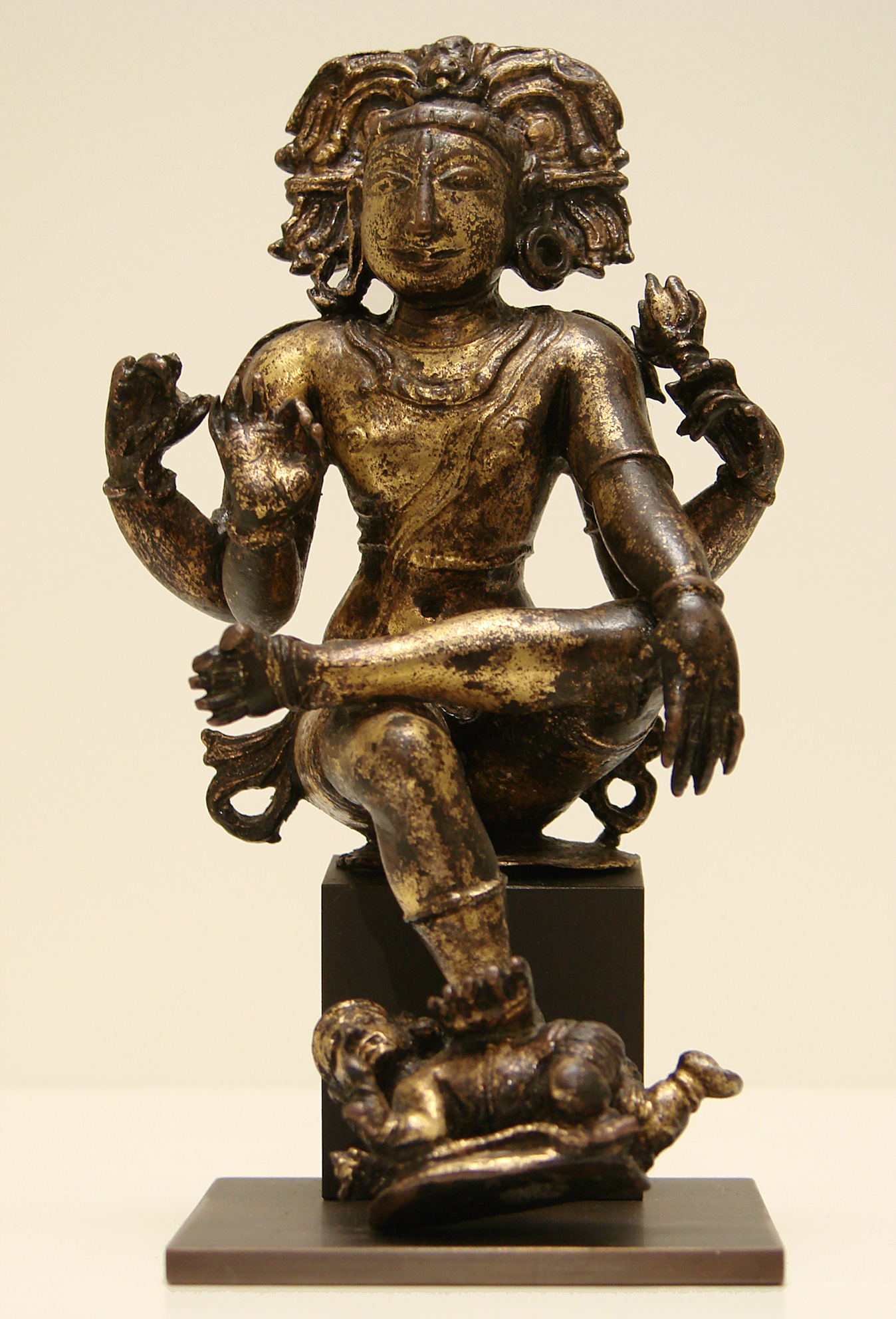
Dakshinamurti, 16th century, Musée Guimet (museum), Paris.

== Iconography ==
In his aspect as Jnana Dakshinamurti, Shiva is generally shown with four arms, seated under a banyan tree and facing south upon a deer-throne, surrounded by sages receiving his instruction. He is depicted seated with his right foot resting on Apasmara—the personification of ignorance—while his left foot lies folded on his lap. Wild animals are sometimes depicted surrounding him.

In his upper arms, he holds a snake or rosary or both in one hand and a flame in the other; his lower right hand displays the vyakhyana mudra, representing teaching, while his lower left hand holds a bundle of kusha grass or the scriptures. The index finger of his right hand is bent to touch the tip of his thumb with the other three fingers stretched apart, forming the jnana mudra, representing wisdom. Sometimes, this hand is in the abhaya mudra, a gesture of protection.

Yoga Dakshinamurti represents Shiva as a guru and teacher of yoga, typically portrayed in one of two four-armed forms: either seated in the padmasana (lotus position) engrossed in dhyana (meditation)—holding a trishula (trident) and a kapala (skull cup) in his upper hands while his lower hands display the chin mudra and rest near his chest. He is also depicted seated beneath a banyan tree with one leg supported by a yogapatta (yogic belt), holding an akshamala (rosary) and fire in his upper hands while his lower hands show dhyana mudra and abhaya mudra, flanked by two kneeling deer and a coiled cobra.

Variations of this iconic representation include Veenadhara Dakshinamurti (holding a veena) and Rishabharudha Dakshinamurti (mounted on rishabha, the bull).

== Symbolism ==
Worshipers at Dakshinamurti temple at Brihadeeswarar temple

The attributes and mudras (hand gestures) associated with the deity carry symbolic interpretations:

- Apasmara: The dwarf crushed beneath his foot symbolizes avidya (ignorance).
- Jnana mudra: The joined thumb and index finger represent Paramatman (God) and jivatman (the individual), respectively. The three remaining extended fingers symbolise either:
  - The three spiritual impurities: anava (arrogance), maya (illusion), and karma (accumulated past deeds), from which detachment leads to liberation.
  - The three states of consciousness: jagruti (waking), svapna (dreaming), and sushupti (deep sleep).
- Abhaya mudra: The raised palm gesture signifies divine grace and protection extended to seekers.
- Attributes: The flame represents spiritual illumination, while the akshamala (rosary) or snake symbolises Tantric knowledge.

== Temples ==
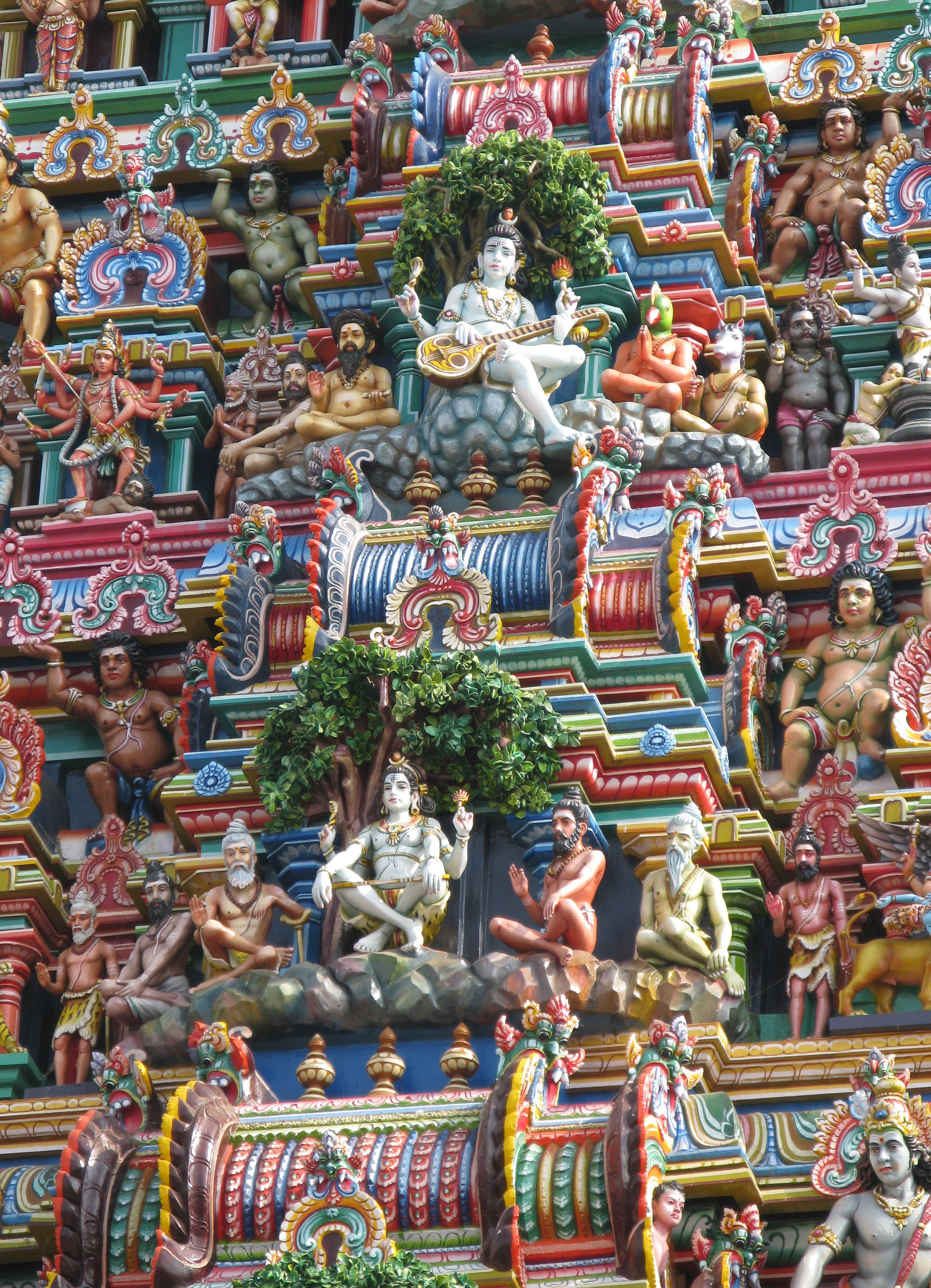
The Gopuram of Kapaleeshwarar temple, Chennai depicts two sculptures of Dakshinamurti: one playing the veena, another in a meditative state.

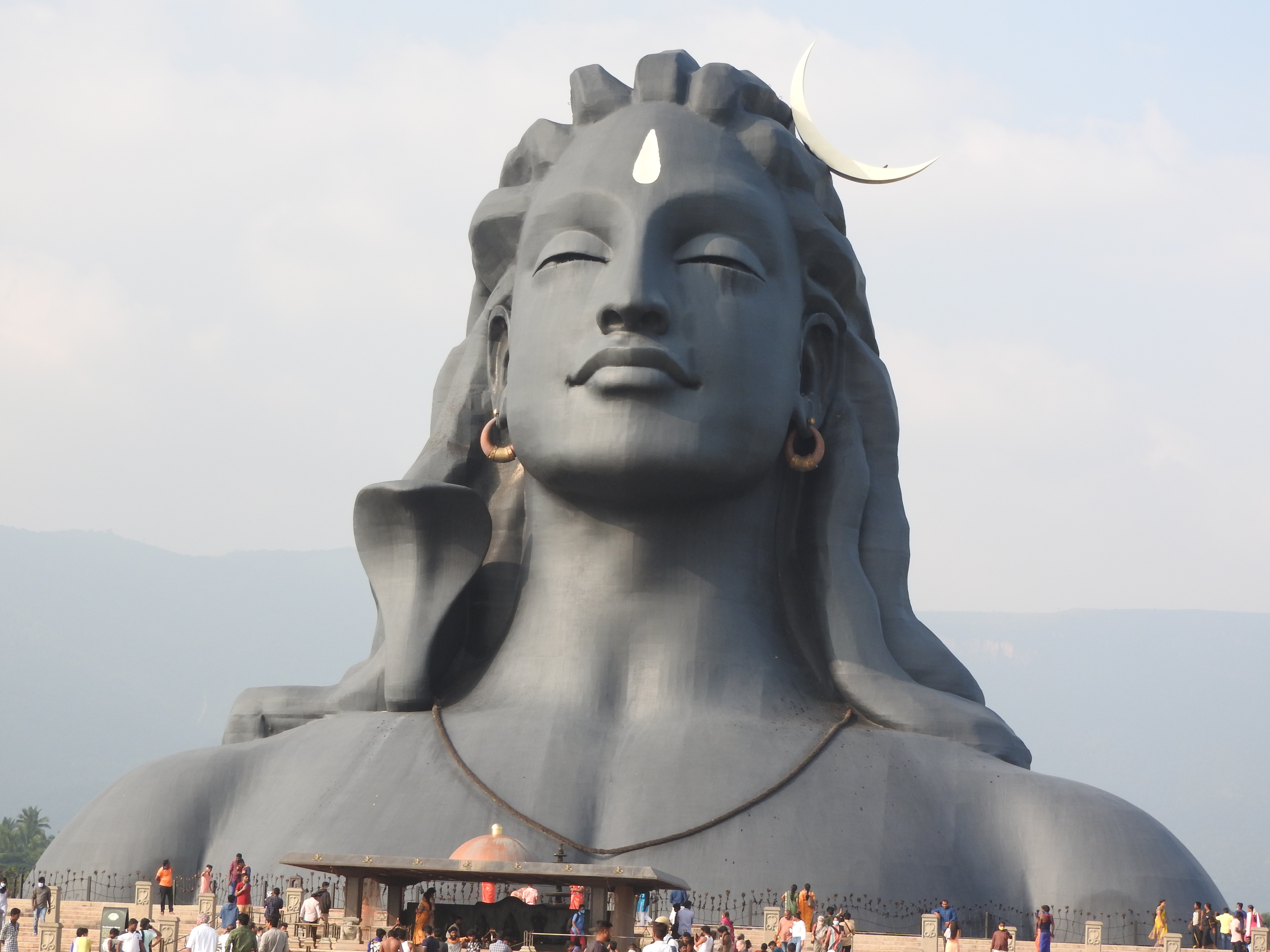
South-facing Shiva statue in Coimbatore in the form of Adiyogi, the first yogi

Even though the icon of Dakshinamurti is installed in every Shiva temple, there are only a few temples where Dakshinamurti is the chief deity.

- Only one of the twelve Jyotirlingas is Dakshinamurti, the Mahakaleshwar in Ujjain. Being the only Dakshinmurthy Jyotirlinga, It holds special importance for Shaivites as a site of learning.
- Sree Dakshinamurthi Swamy inside temple complex of Srikalahasteeswara temple, in Andhra Pradesh
- Sree Dakshinamurti Temple at Sukapuram, Edappal, Ponnani Taluk, Malappuram District, Kerala. Pratishtha was done by Suka Maharshi. It is estimated to be 1500 years old.
- Sree Medha Dakshinamurti Temple in gujrathipeta, Srikakulam in Andhra Pradesh.
- Sree Medha Dakshina Murthy Temple, Sri Neelakanteswara Swamy Temple Complex, Makavaram, Kuddigam village, Srikakulam District, Andhra Pradesh, consecrated in June 2022
- Thiruvairanikulam Dakshinamurthy Temple, located to the southern side of the famous Thiruvairanikulam Mahadeva Temple on the bank of Periyar river, in Vellarapally village in Ernakulam district. It is famous as the only temple in Kerala where Dakshinamurthy has an idol in human form. Formerly under ruins for around two centuries, it was renovated in 2019.
- The deity at the famous Shiva temple in Vaikom town in Kottayam district of Kerala is worshipped as Dakshinamurti in the morning, Kirathamurthy in the afternoon and as Umamaheshwara in the evening.
- Ettumanoor Mahadevar Temple in Kerala, where the deity enshrined in the form of a Shivalingam is considered as Dakshinamurti
- Alangudi, Kumbakonam, Tamil Nadu
- Sree Dakshinamurti Temple at Pattamangalam village, in Sivagangai District, Tamil Nadu. It is estimated that this temple is nearly 500 years old.
- In the Sivanandeswarar temple in Thirupanthurai, Tanjore, Tamil Nadu, He is depicted in the Ardhanari form.
- In Thirupulivanam, we can find Dakshinamurti in the form of Ardhanariswara. This temple is on the Uthiramerur-Kanchipuram road, 5 km from Uthiramerur, near Chennai.
- In March 2007, a big temple of Dakshinamurti (the first in Maharashtra) was created in the Shrutisagar Ashram, about 30 km from Pune
- Pragya Dakshinamoorthy at Chibavananda Ashram in Theni, western Tamil Nadu
- In Suchindram Thanumalaya temple (5 km from Nagercoil, Kanyakumari Dist.), contrary to tradition, Dakshinamurti is worshipped instead of Ganesh/Vinayaka. Ganesha statue comes last in the worship line.
- In Thiruvotriyur, Chennai a dedicated temple to Dakshinamurti exists. It is unique as the deity faces north and is aptly called Vadagurusthalam (the guru's place of north).
- The oldest Dakshnimurthy temple is situated in Poonthottam village in Thiruvarur, Tamil Nadu. It is estimated that this temple is nearly 1000 years old and the idol of the deity was fixed on the day of mahakumbamela that took place 1000 years ago
- Dakshinamurti temple at Vellave near Taliparambu (Kannur District, Kerala), This is a swayambhoo temple (self evolved) of Dakshinamurthi. This temple is situated 4 km away from the famous Rajarajeshwara Temple, Taliparamba
- Panaickal Sree Dakshinamurti temple at Kadakkarappally, Cherthala Thaluk in Alappuzha District, Kerala
- Since 2002, Mauritius has seen its one and only Dakshinamurti Temple located on the east coast at Palmar on the Indian Ocean, in the compound of Arsha Vidya Ashram. The deity has occupied a place in the Ashram since 1994 but in 2002, a temple was built according to the rules of shahastra nama to give an altar to the Lord.
- One of the temples in the United States dedicated to Dakshinamurti is located at Arsha Vidya Gurukulam in Saylorsburg, Pennsylvania.
- Adiyogi – The Abode of Yoga is a 30,000 square foot space located at the Isha Institute of Inner-sciences, Tennessee, USA. It houses a 21 feet statue of Adiyogi Shiva (which is seen as representation of Dakshinamurti), along with a Shivalinga.
- Gurusthalam at Thiruvallur, Tamil Nad Shree Yoga Gnana Dhakshanamoorthy Peetam
- A 112 feet, South-facing Adiyogi Shiva statue (Adiyogi – The Source of Yoga) along with a linga called "Yogeshwar Linga". It is located at the Isha Yoga Center in Coimbatore, India. The South-facing Adiyogi is seen as a representation of Dakshinamurti, and is considered the Adi Guru or the first Guru.
- Thrikkapeleswaram Dakshinamurthi temple located in Niranam, Kadapra, Pathanamthitta dist, Kerala is one of the oldest Dakshinamurthi temple.

== Hymns ==
Many mantras are dedicated to Dakshinamurti:

Dakshinamurti Gayatri Mantra

Om Vṛṣabhadhvajaya Vidmahe
Dhyānahastaya Dhīmahi
Tanno Dakṣiṇāmūrti Pracodayat

Dakshinamurti Stotra

oṃ maunavyākhyā prakaṭita parabrahmatatvaṃ yuvānaṃ
varśiṣṭhānte vasad ṛṣigaṇair āvṛtaṃ brahmaniṣṭhaiḥ
ācāryendraṃ karakalita cinmudram ānandamūrtiṃ
svātmarāmaṃ muditavadanaṃ dakṣiṇāmūrtimīḍe

I salute Śrī Dakṣiṇāmūrti, the Young Guru, who teaches the knowledge of Brahman through silence, who is surrounded by disciples, who are themselves ṛṣis and scholars in the Vedas. (I worship Śrī Dakṣiṇāmūrti), who is the teacher of teachers, whose hand is held in the sign of knowledge (cin-mudrā), whose nature is fullness, who reveals in himself, and who is ever silent.
