= Volute =

Spiral scroll-like ornament that forms the basis of the Ionic order

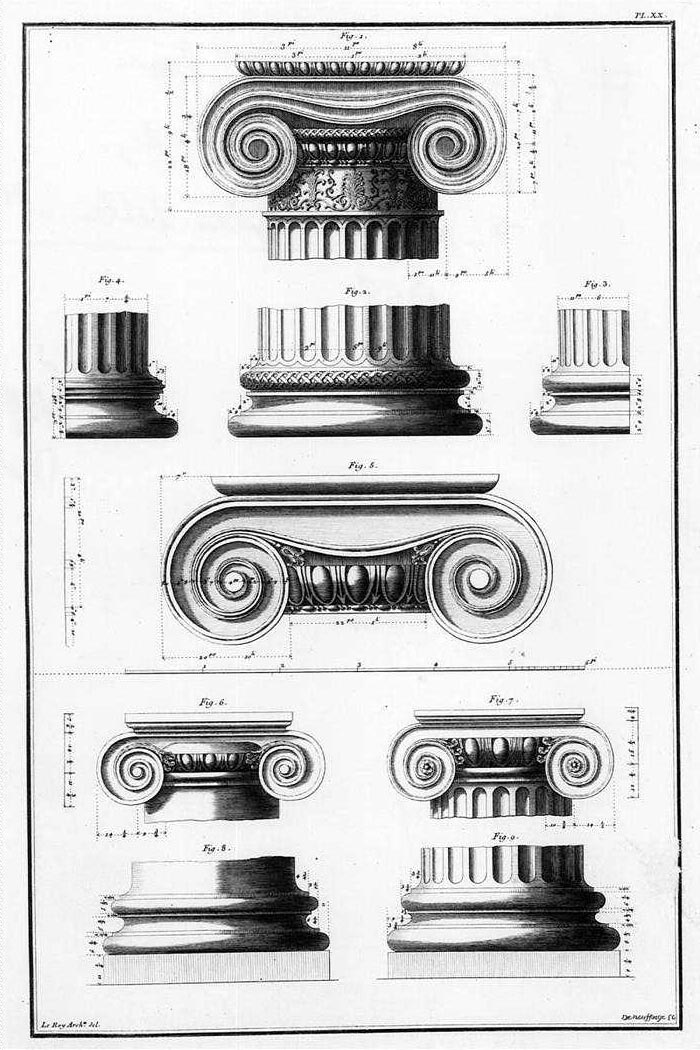
Examples of Ionic volutes. From Julien David LeRoy, Les ruines plus beaux des monuments de la Grèce, Paris, 1758 (Plate XX)

A volute is a spiral, scroll-like ornament that forms the basis of the Ionic order, found in the capital of the Ionic column. It was later incorporated into Corinthian order and Composite column capitals. Four are normally to be found on an Ionic capital, eight on Composite capitals and smaller versions (sometimes called helix) on the Corinthian capital.

The word derives from the Latin voluta ("scroll"). It has been suggested that the ornament was inspired by the curve of a ram's horns, or perhaps was derived from the natural spiral found in the ovule of a common species of clover native to Greece. Alternatively, it may simply be of geometrical origin.

The ornament can be seen in Renaissance and Baroque architecture and is a common decoration in furniture design, silverware and ceramics. A method of drawing the complex geometry was devised by the ancient Roman architect Vitruvius through the study of classical buildings and structures.

== Gallery ==
=== Ornamentation ===
This gallery shows volutes in different media, styles, materials and period. Some styles and cultures made them a key motif of their art, like in the case of Ancient Greek or Rococo art, while in other cases, they were used rarely, like in the case of Ancient Egypt. Their use is also influenced by materials and techniques. This is one of the reasons why they are so widespread in wrought iron. They were also fused over time with different other motifs that were fashionable at the time, like acanthuses, which led to the rinceau (sinuous and branching volutes elaborated with leaves and other natural forms), very popular in the Classical world and in movements that take inspiration from it. Many of the Ancient examples shown are now white, grey or beige, but initially they were colorful, the colour disappearing in time because of exposure to elements. All of these Ancient capitals were painted in highly saturated colours, as laboratory tests and Ancient texts show.

The volute is also a basic universal shape, which is why it cannot be associated with only one culture or period. They are just as popular in Oceanic art as they are in Rococo.

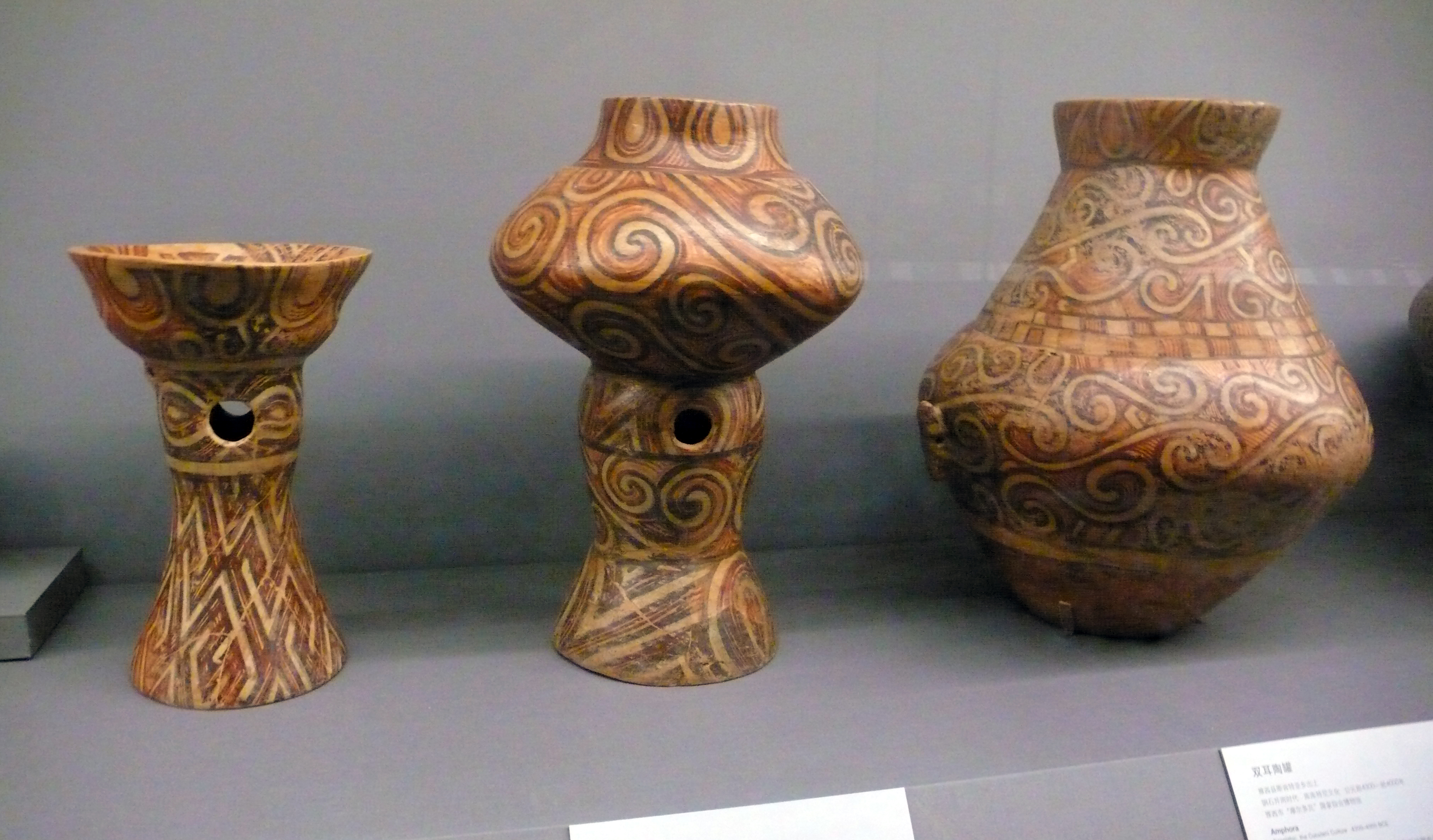
Prehistoric Cucuteni–Trypillia volutes on some vessels, c.4300–4000 BC, ceramic, Moldavia National Museum Complex, Iași, Romania

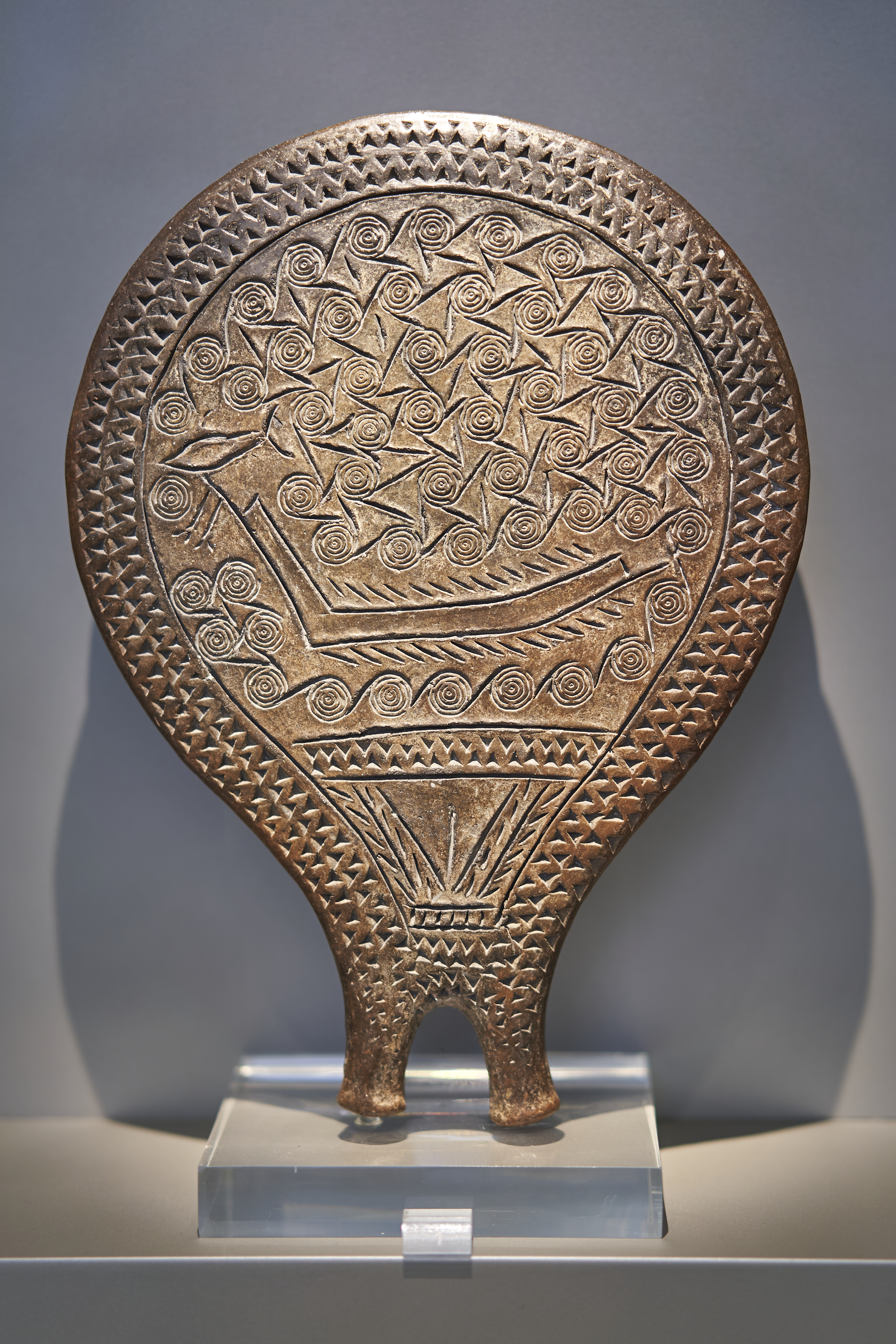
Cycladic volutes on a 'frying pan', c.2750-2200 BC, ceramic, National Archaeological Museum, Athens

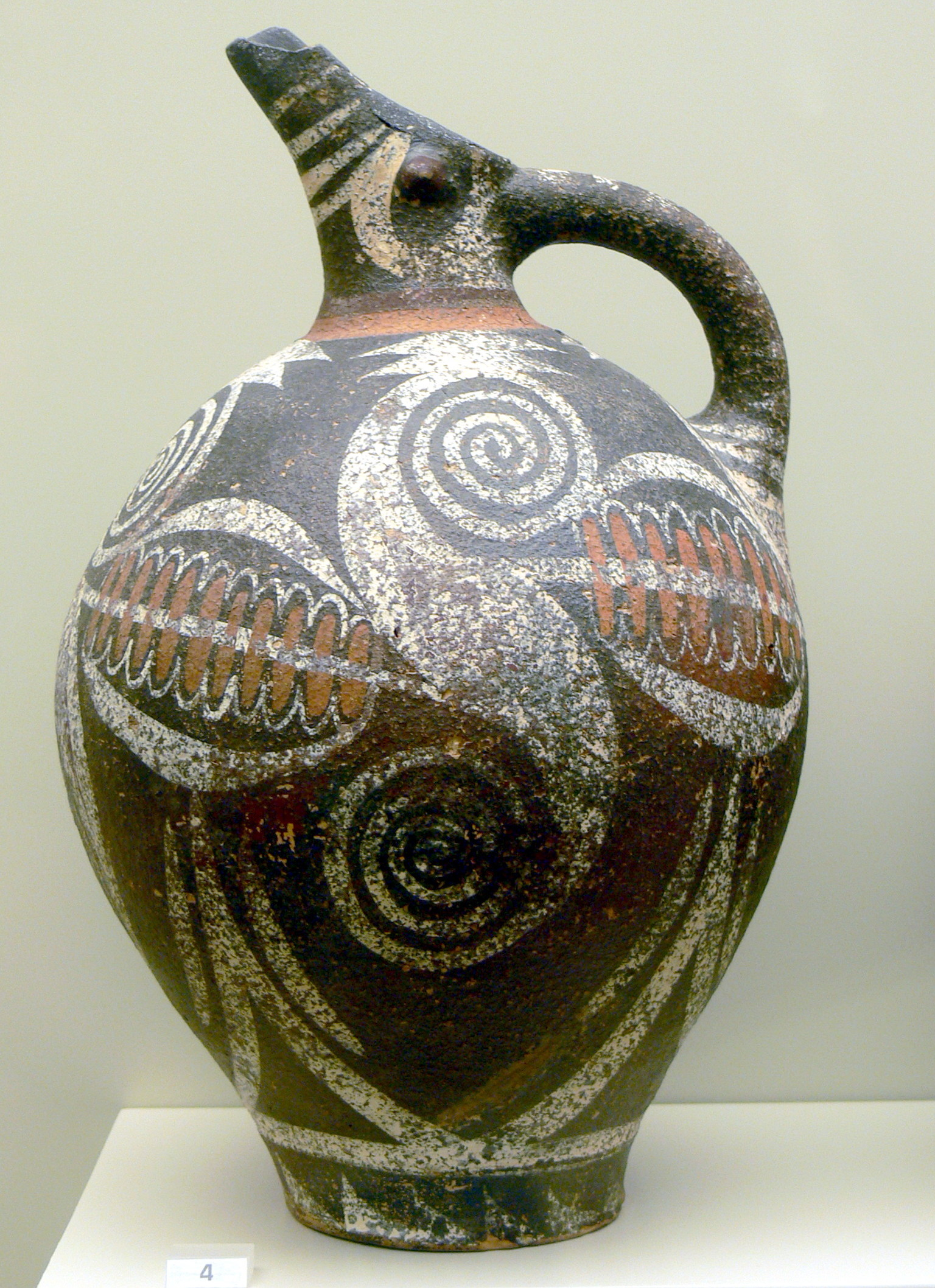
Minoan volutes on a jug, c.1850-1675 BC, ceramic, Archaeological Museum of Heraklion, Heraklion, Greece

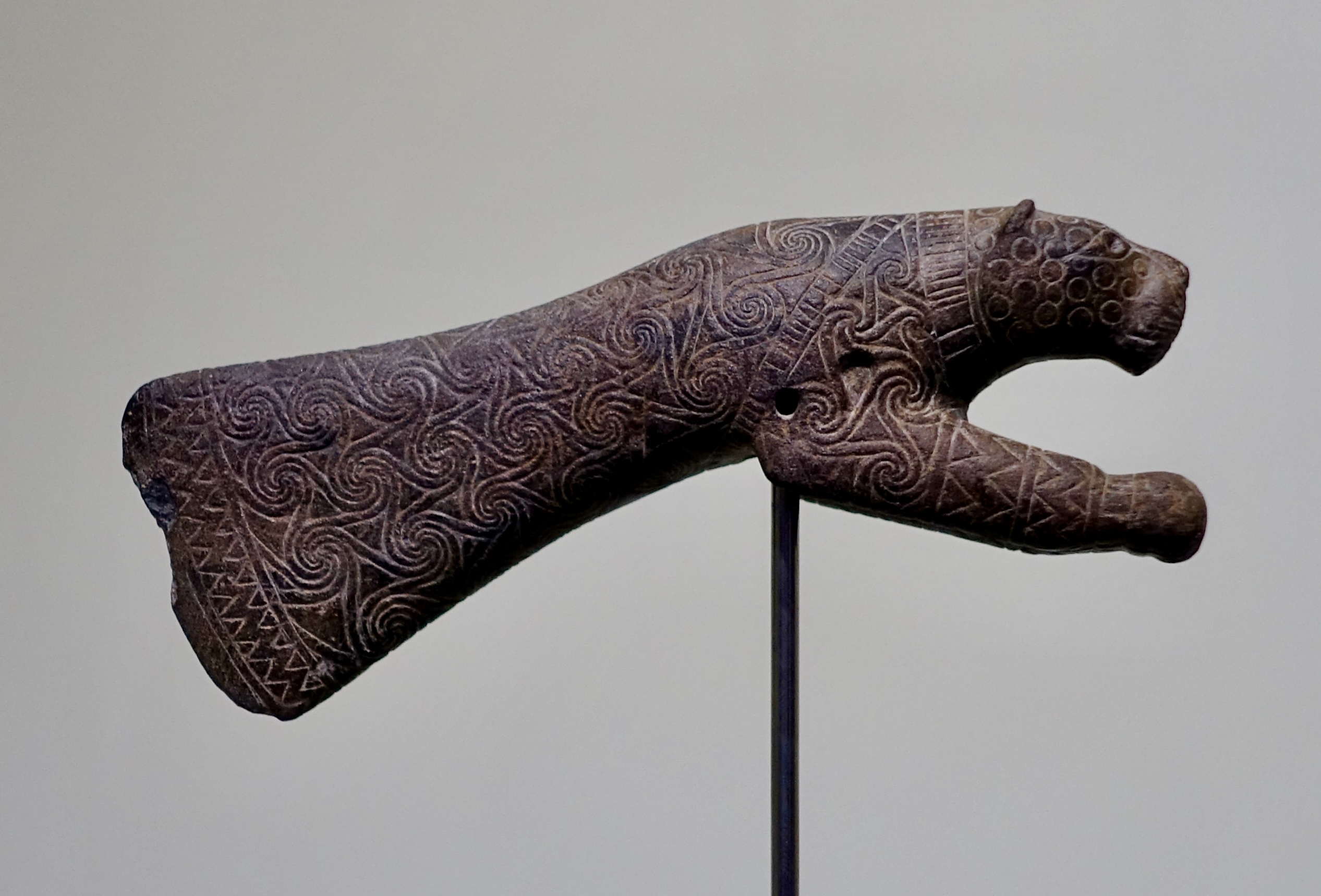
Minoan volutes on a sceptre head, c.1675-1460 BC, schist, Archaeological Museum of Heraklion

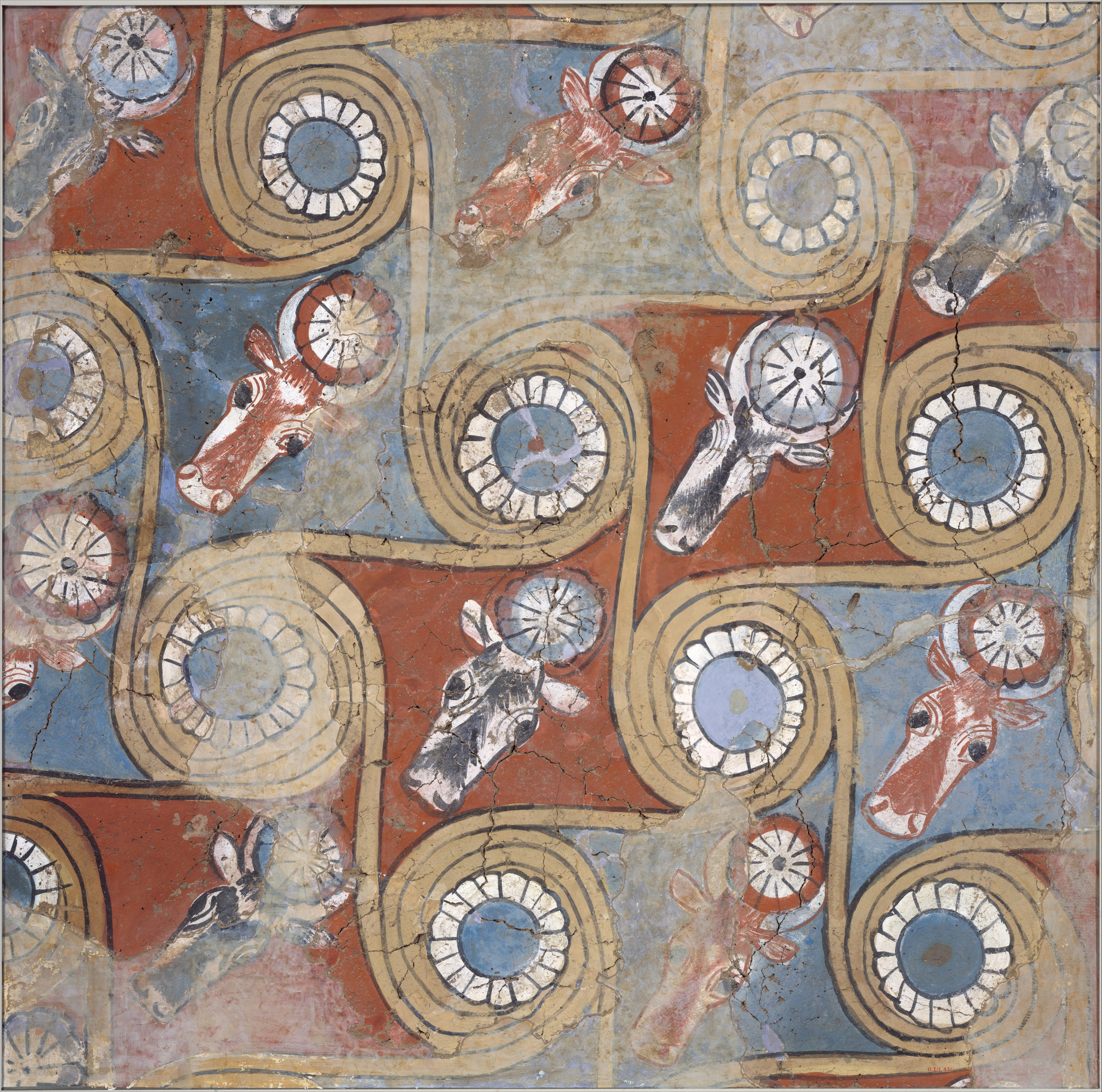
Ancient Egyptian volutes on a ceiling painting from the palace of Amenhotep III, c.1390–1353 BC, dried mud, mud plaster and paint Gesso, Metropolitan Museum of Art, New York City

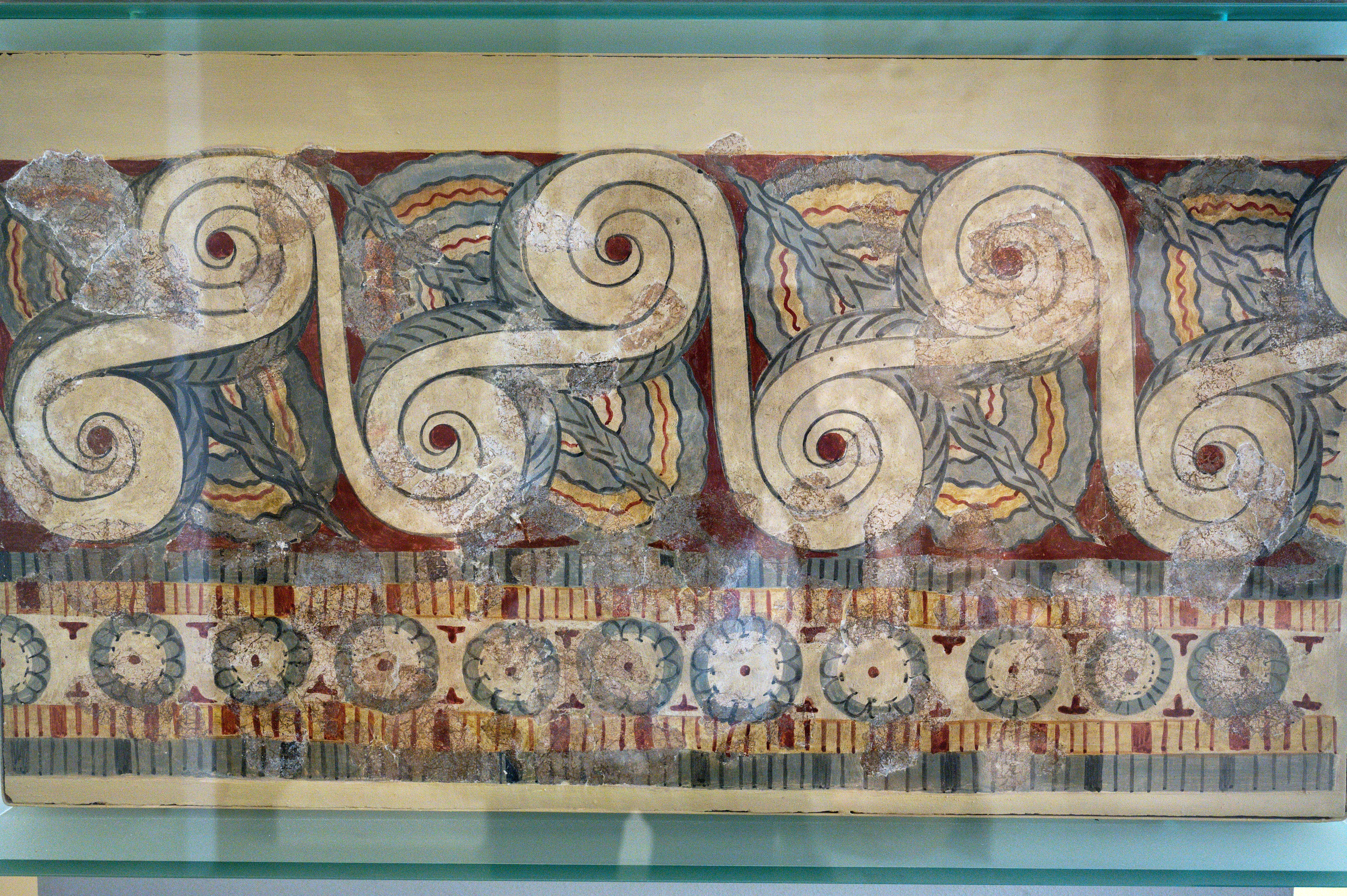
Mycenaean volutes, part of a mural from a palace in Tiryns, Greece, 13th century BC, fresco, Archaeological Museum of Nafplion, Nafplio, Greece

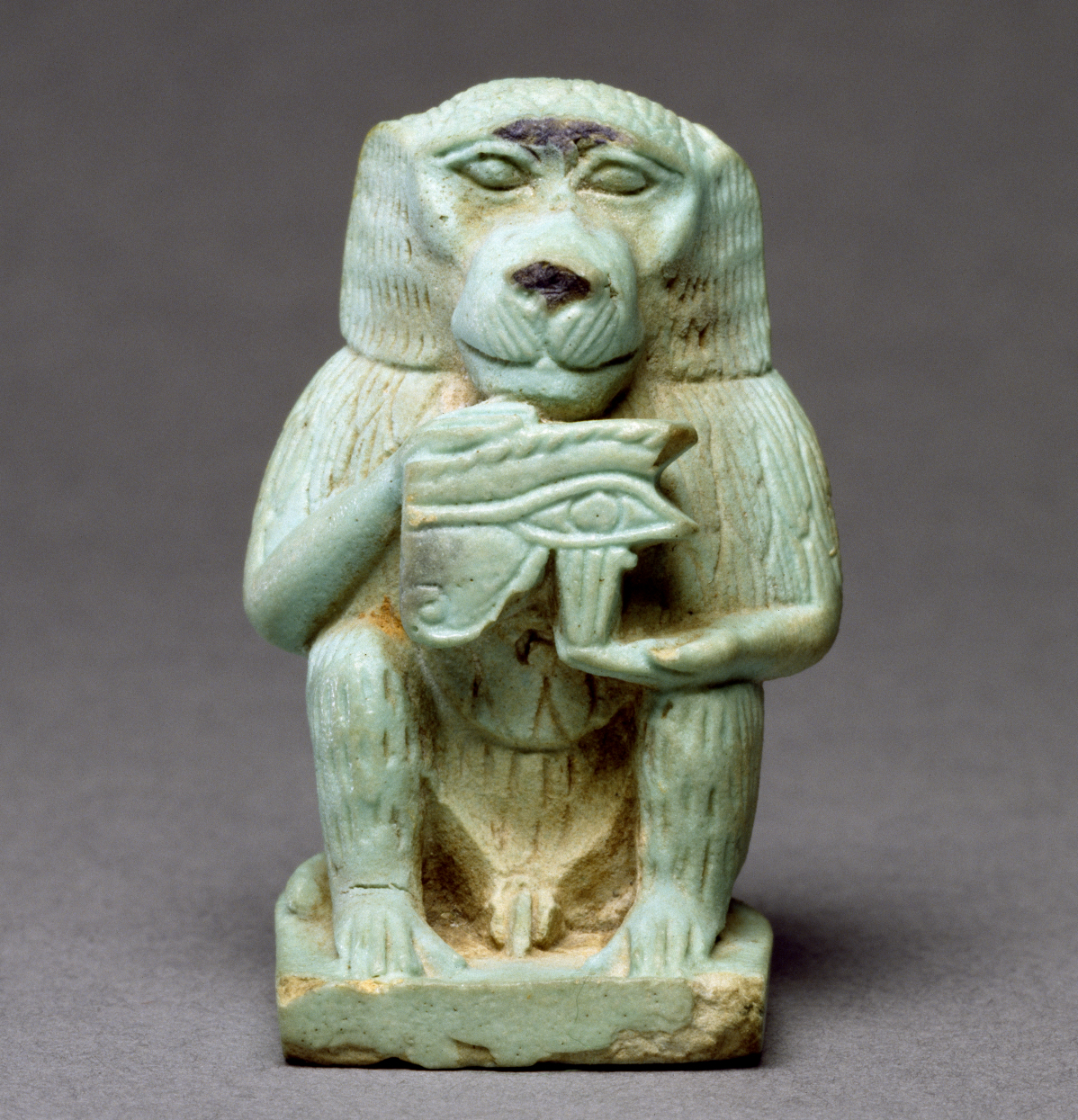
Ancient Egyptian amulet of Thoth as a baboon holding an eye of Horus, with a volute in the lower left part of the eye, 664-332 BC, Egyptian faience with light green glaze, Walters Art Museum, Baltimore, Maryland, US

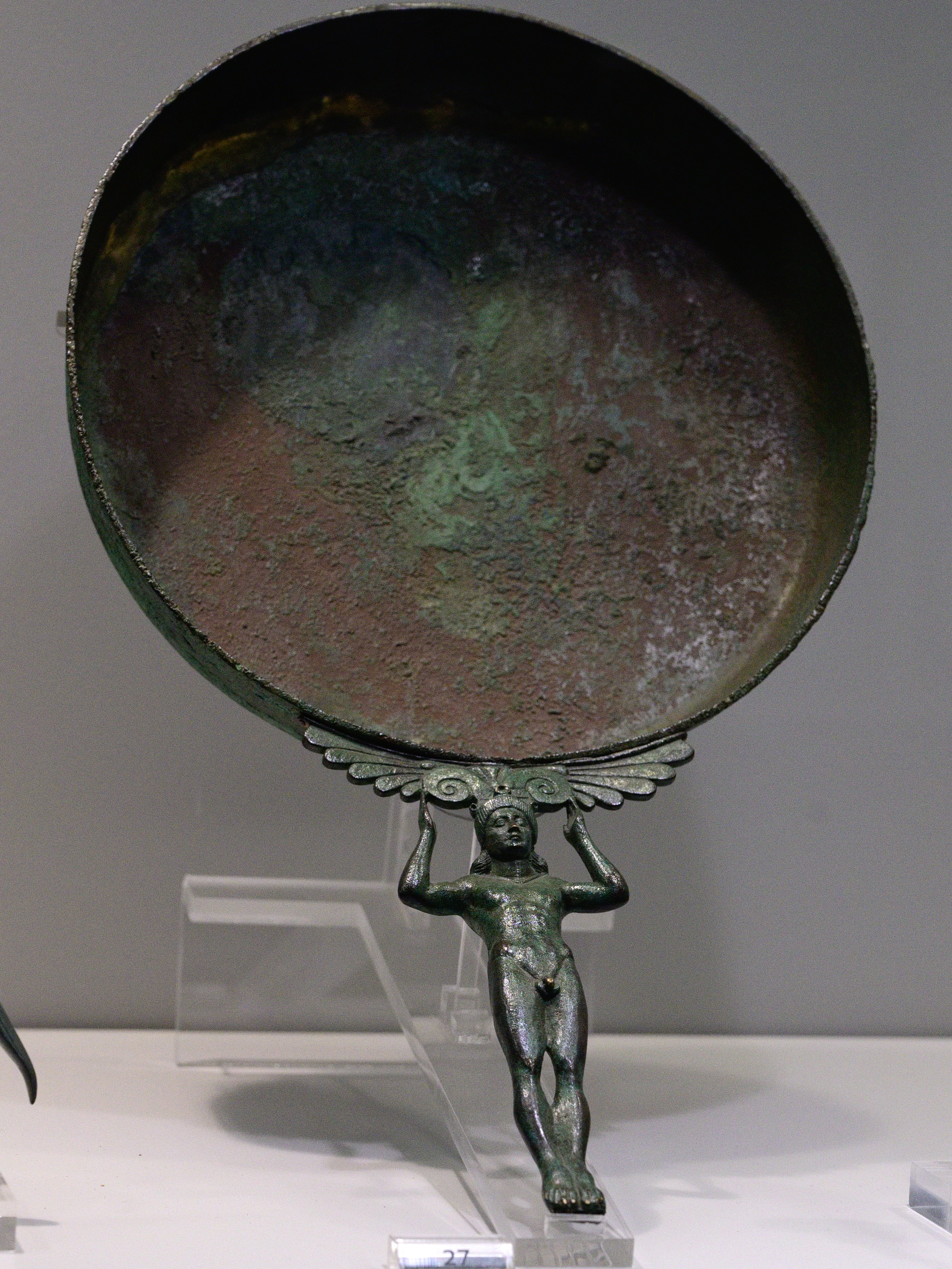
Ancient Greek pair of volutes at the base of the handle of a patera, 6th century BC, bronze, National Archaeological Museum, Athens

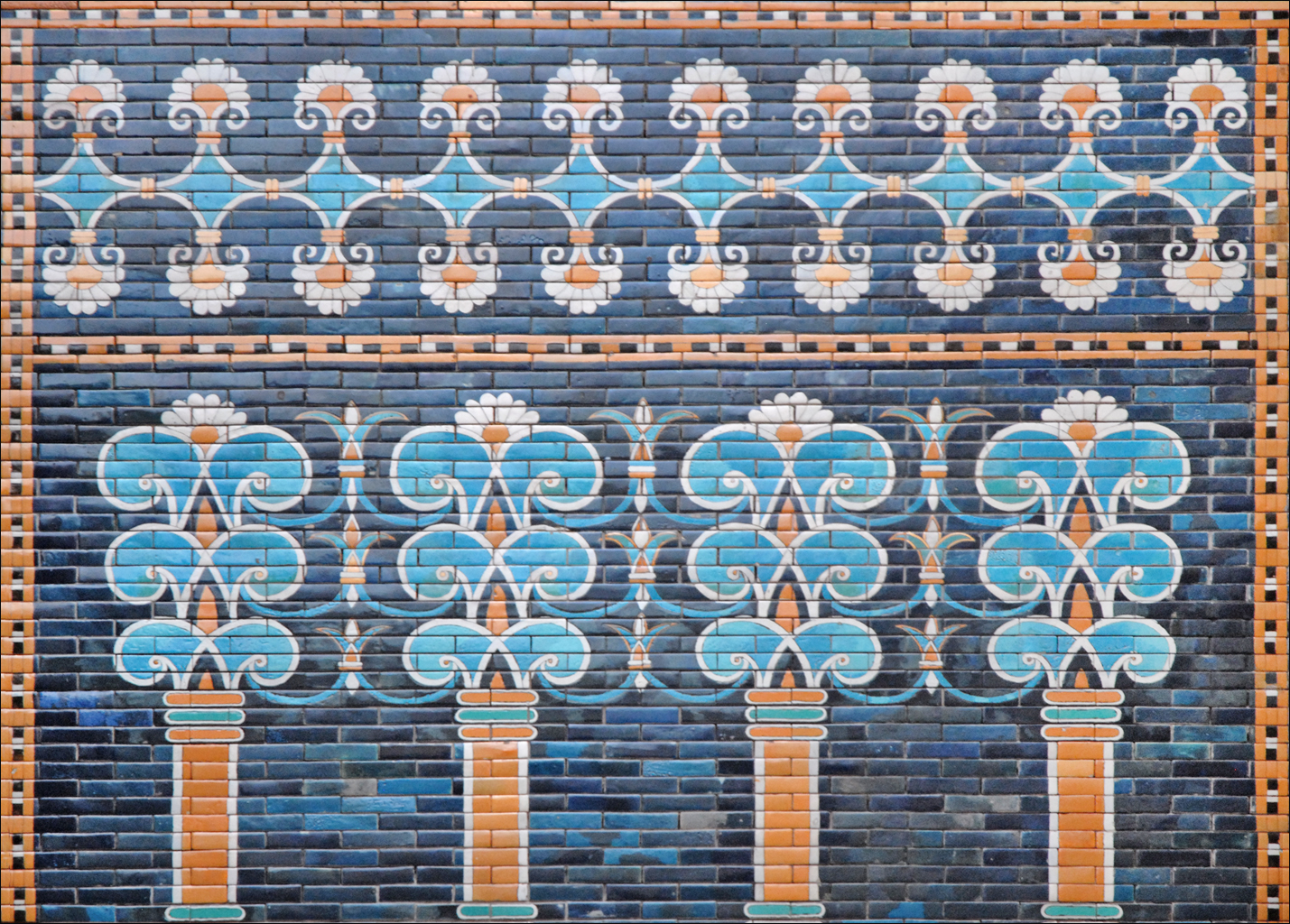
Neo-Babylonian volutes on the wall panel from the Throne Room of Nebuchadnezzar II from Babylon, Iraq, 6th century BC, glazed ceramic, Pergamon Museum, Berlin

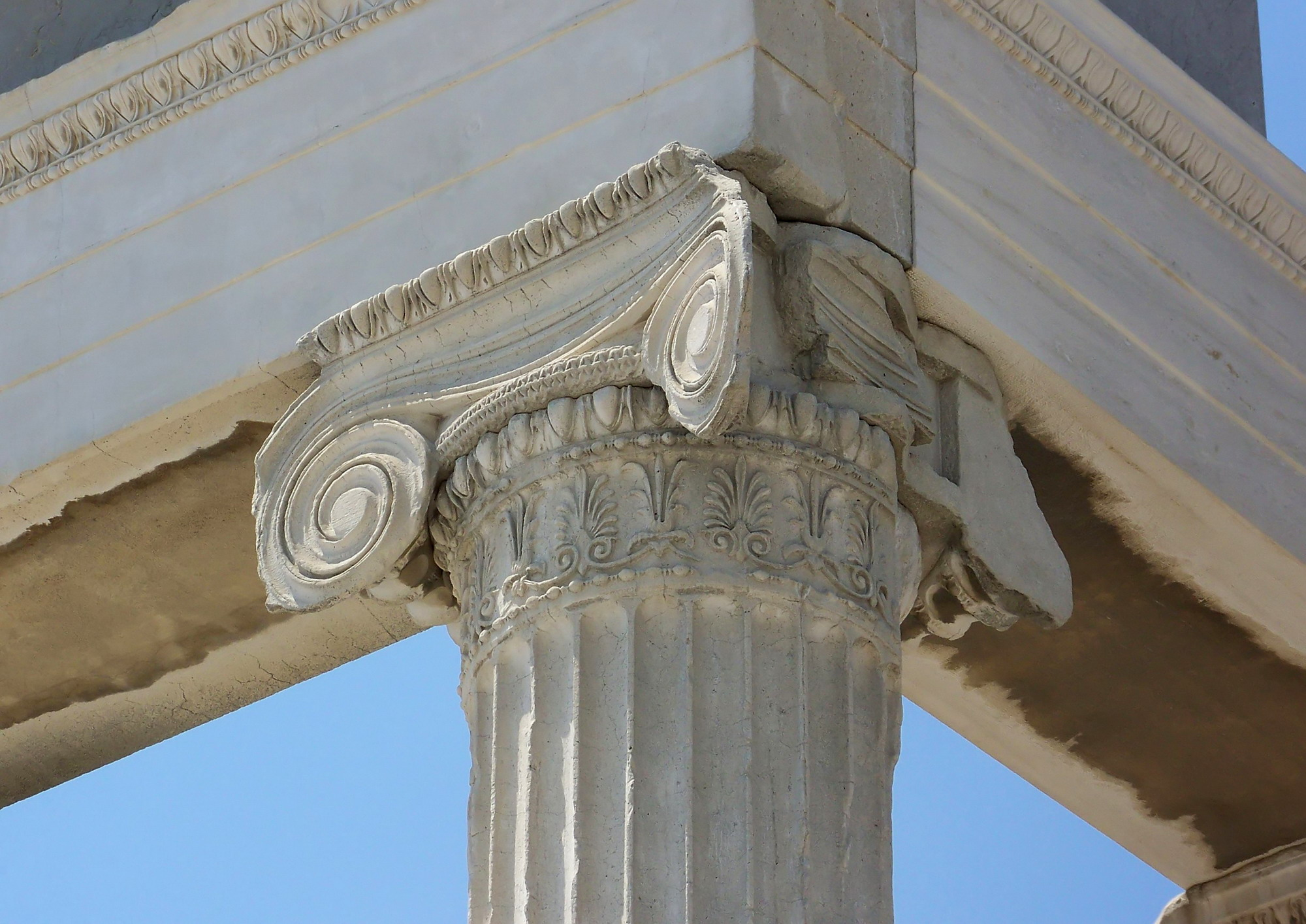
Ancient Greek volutes of a capital from an Ionic columns of the Erechtheion, Athens, Greece, unknown architect, 421-405 BC

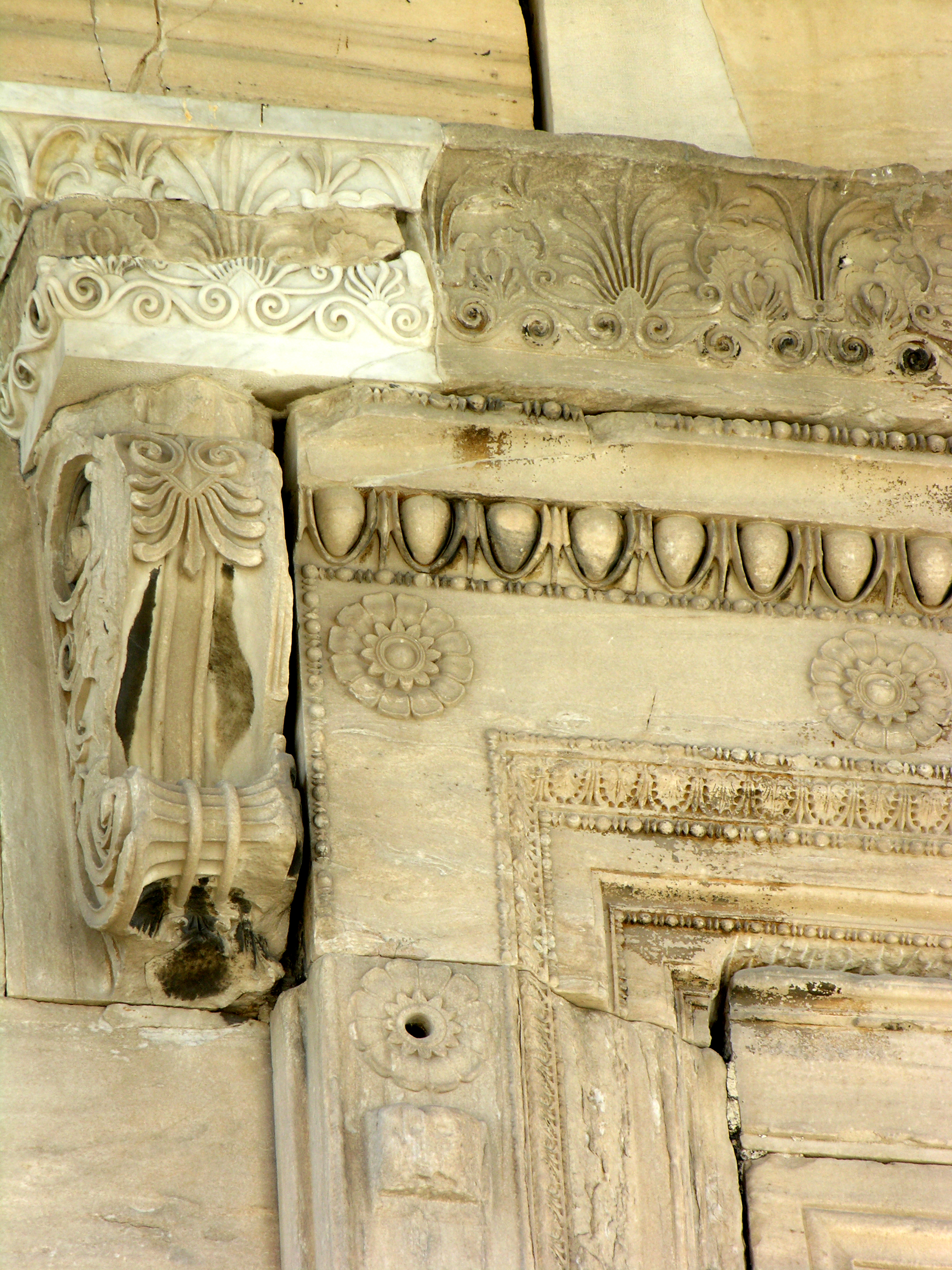
Ancient Greek volutes of a corbel of the Erechtheion

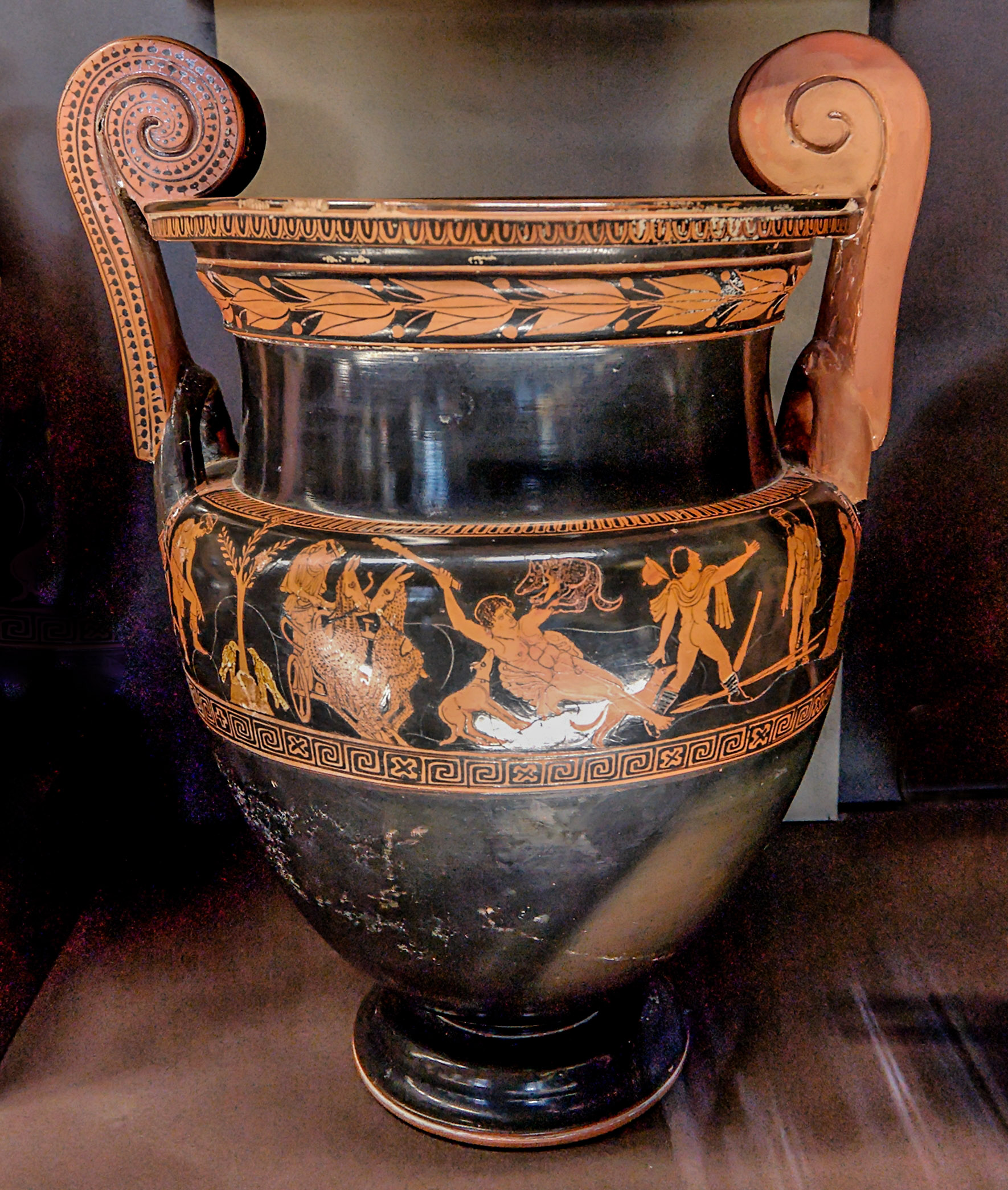
Ancient Greek volutes on a krater, by the Painter of the Woolly Satyrs, 450–440 BC, ceramic, Louvre

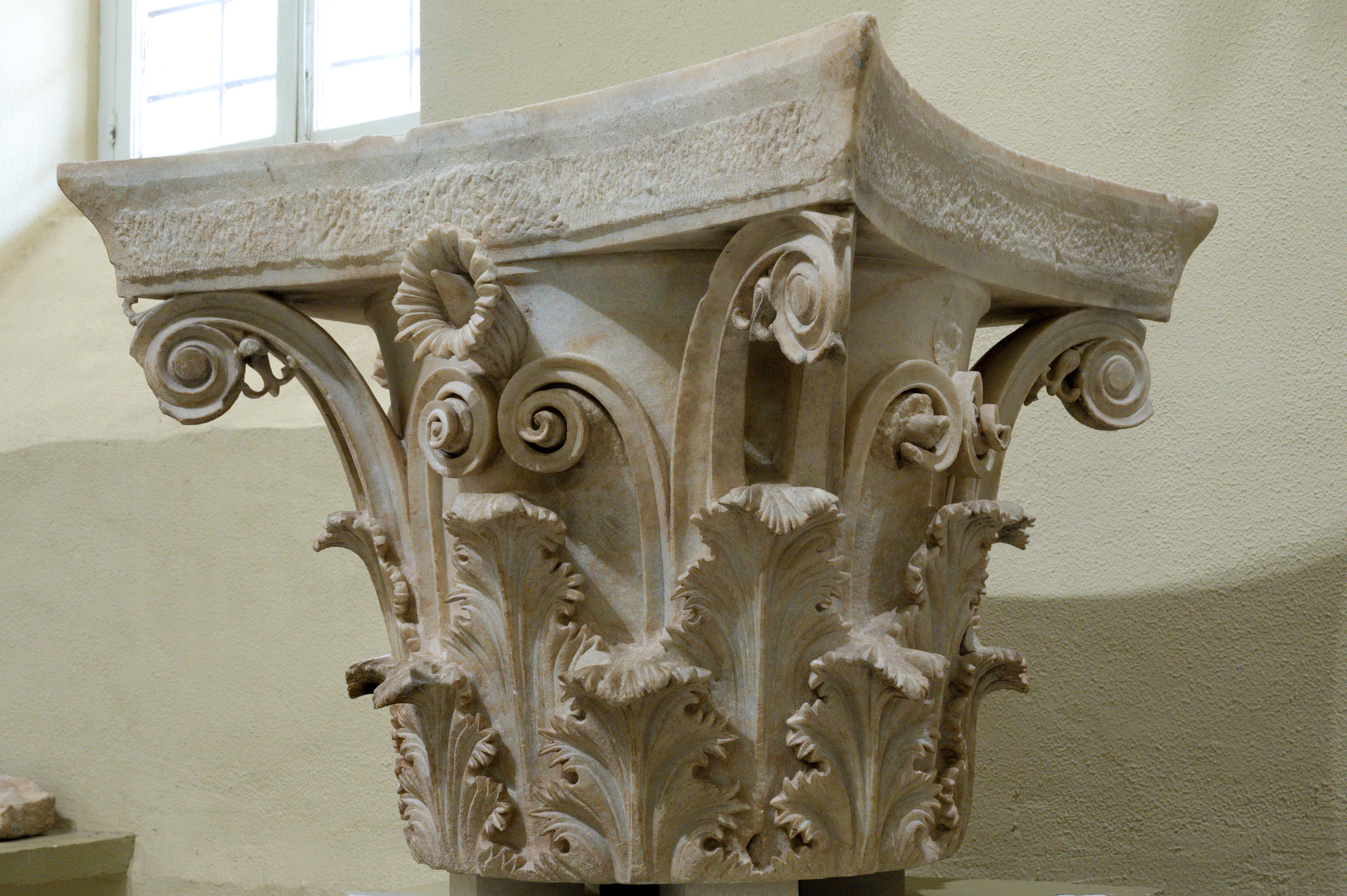
Ancient Greek volutes (called caulicoli) in the upper part of a Corinthian capital from the tholos at Epidaurus, Archaeological Museum of Epidaurus, Greece, said to have been designed by Polyclitus the Younger, c.350 BC

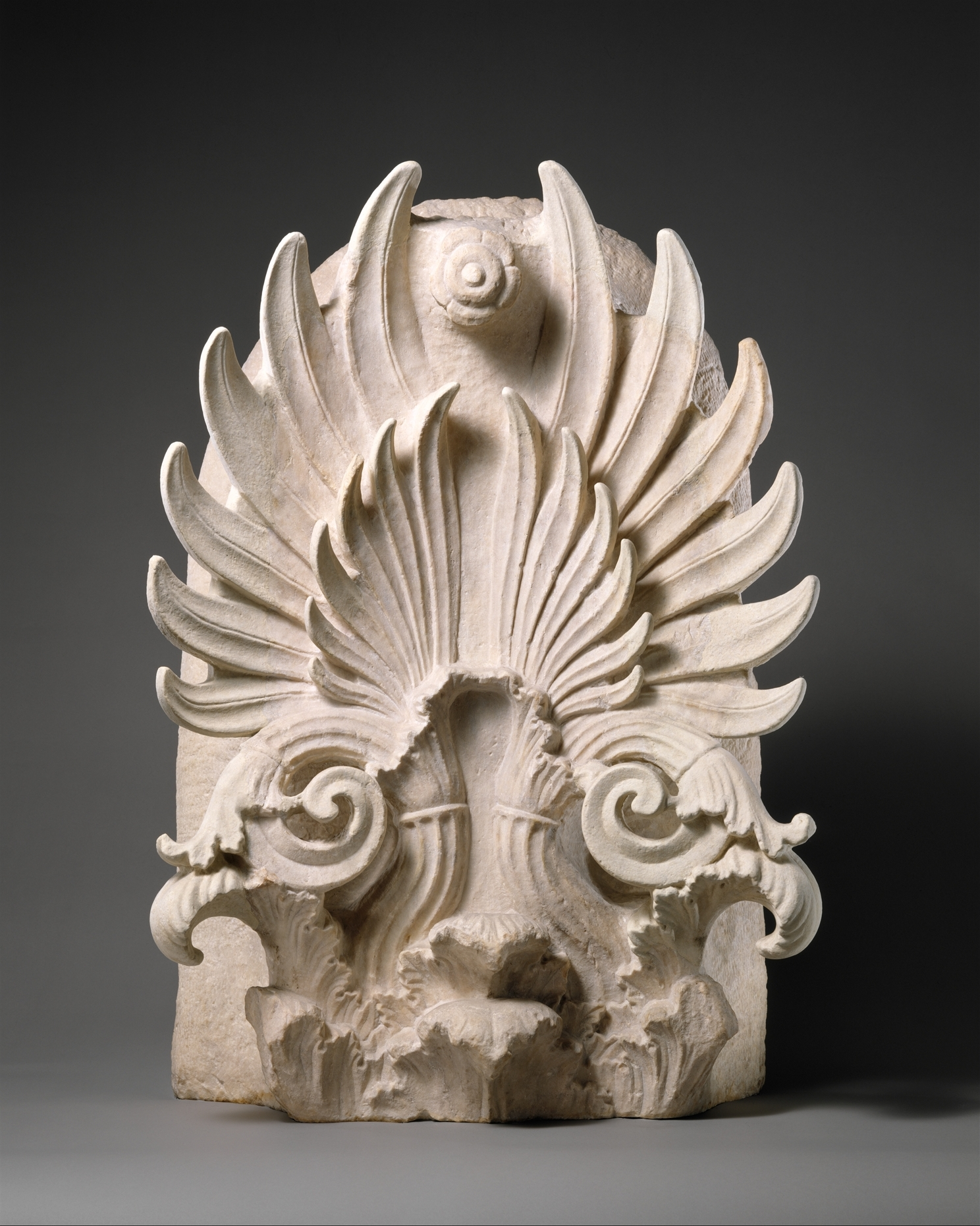
Ancient Greek pair of volutes on an akroterion, 350–325 BC, marble, Metropolitan Museum of Art

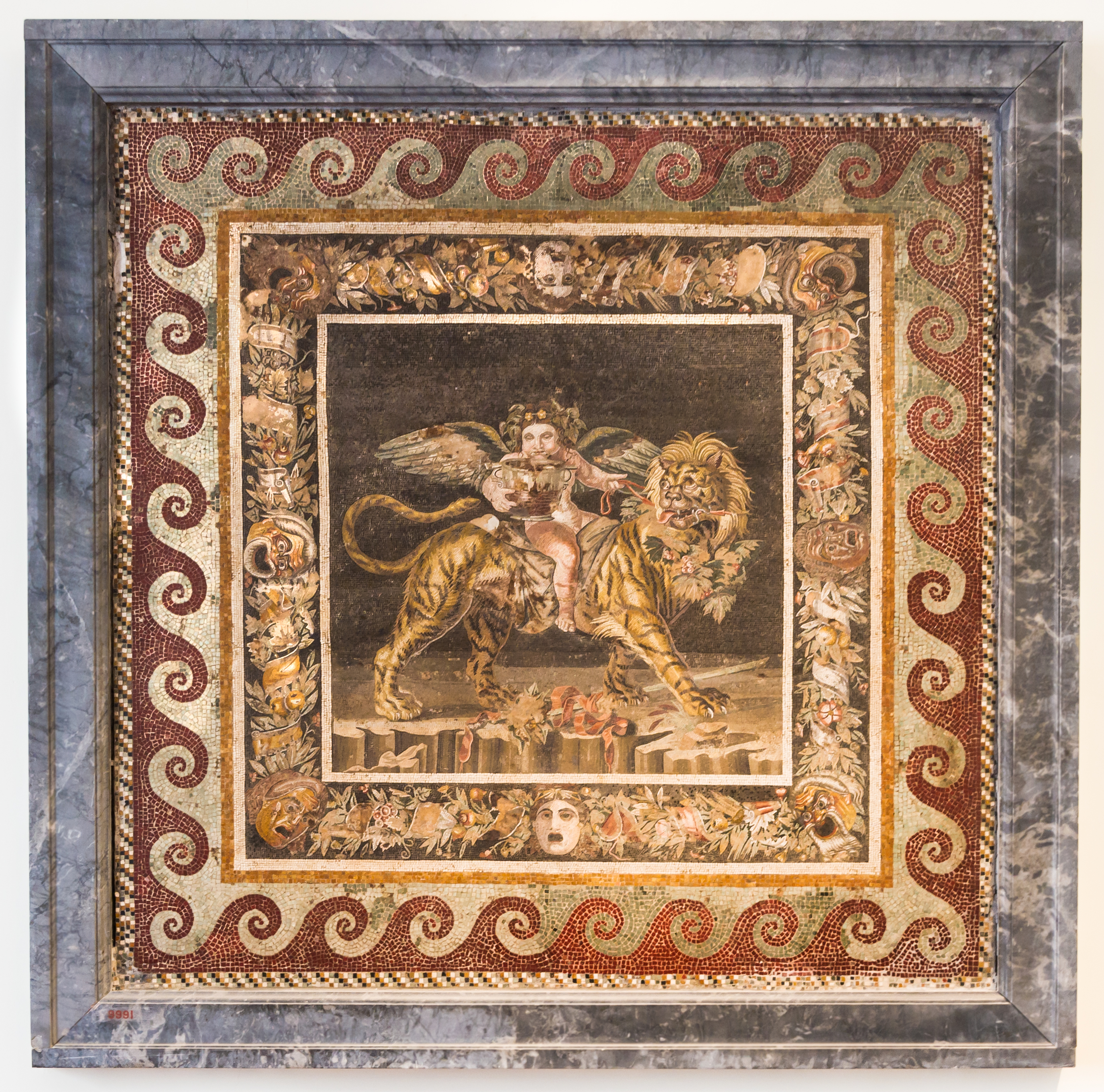
Roman volutes around a mosaic of young Dionysos drinking and riding a tiger, late 4th century BC, mosaic, National Archaeological Museum, Naples, Italy

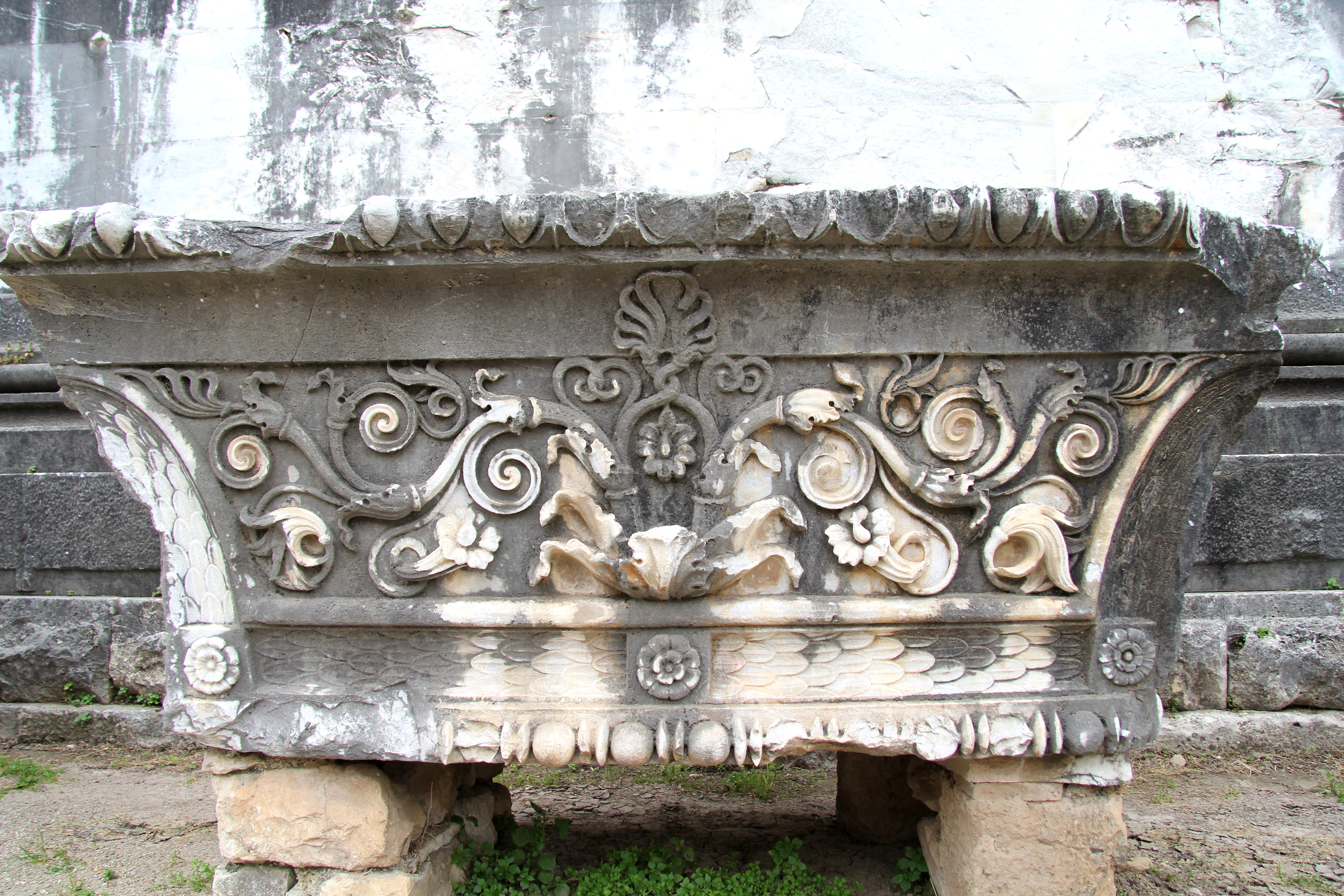
Ancient Greek foliage volutes (aka rinceaux) on a capital from the ruins of the Temple of Apollo at Didyma, Turkey, unknown architect or sculptor, c.300-150 BC

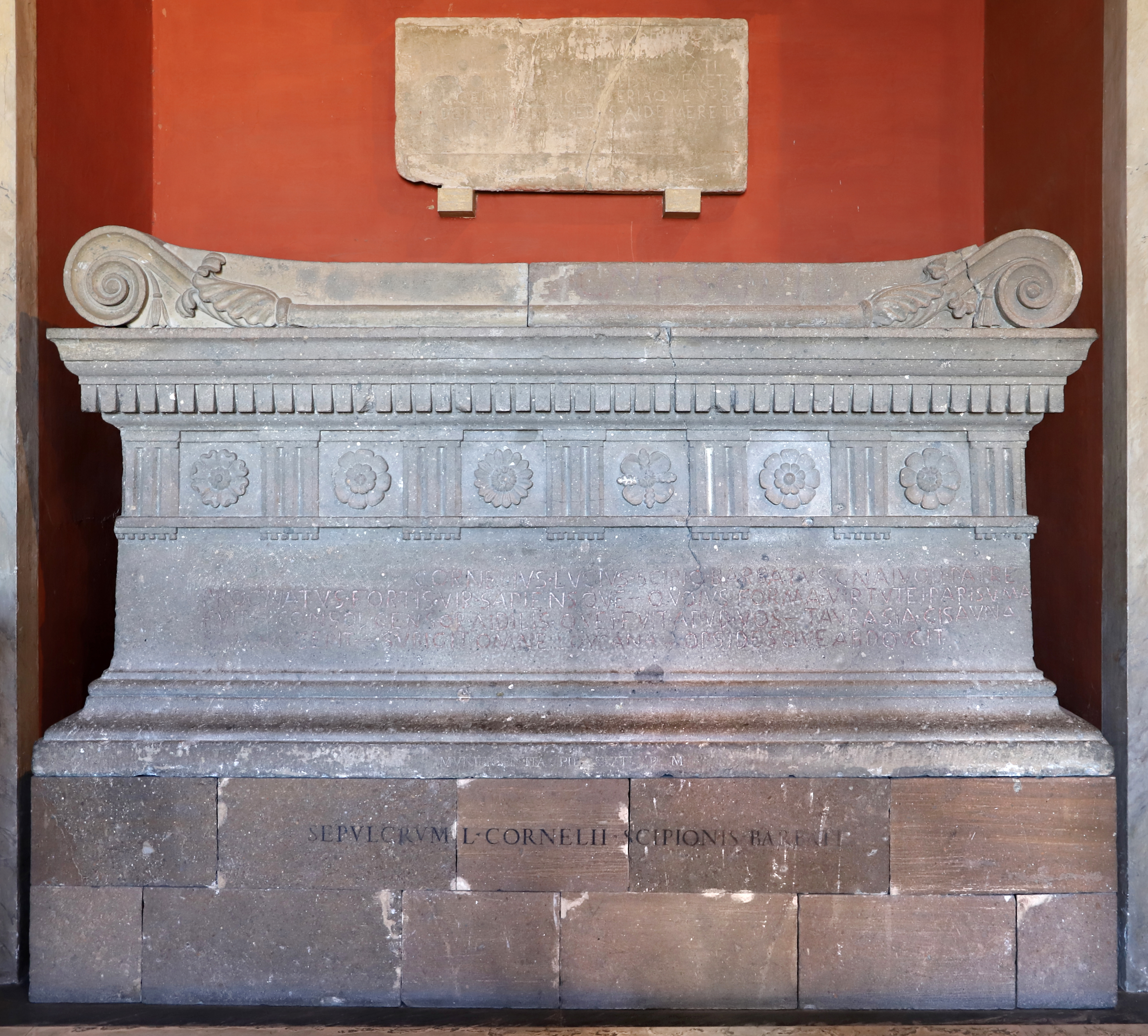
Roman volutes atop the Sarcophagus of Lucius Cornelius Scipio Barbatus, Vatican Museums, Rome, c.270 BC

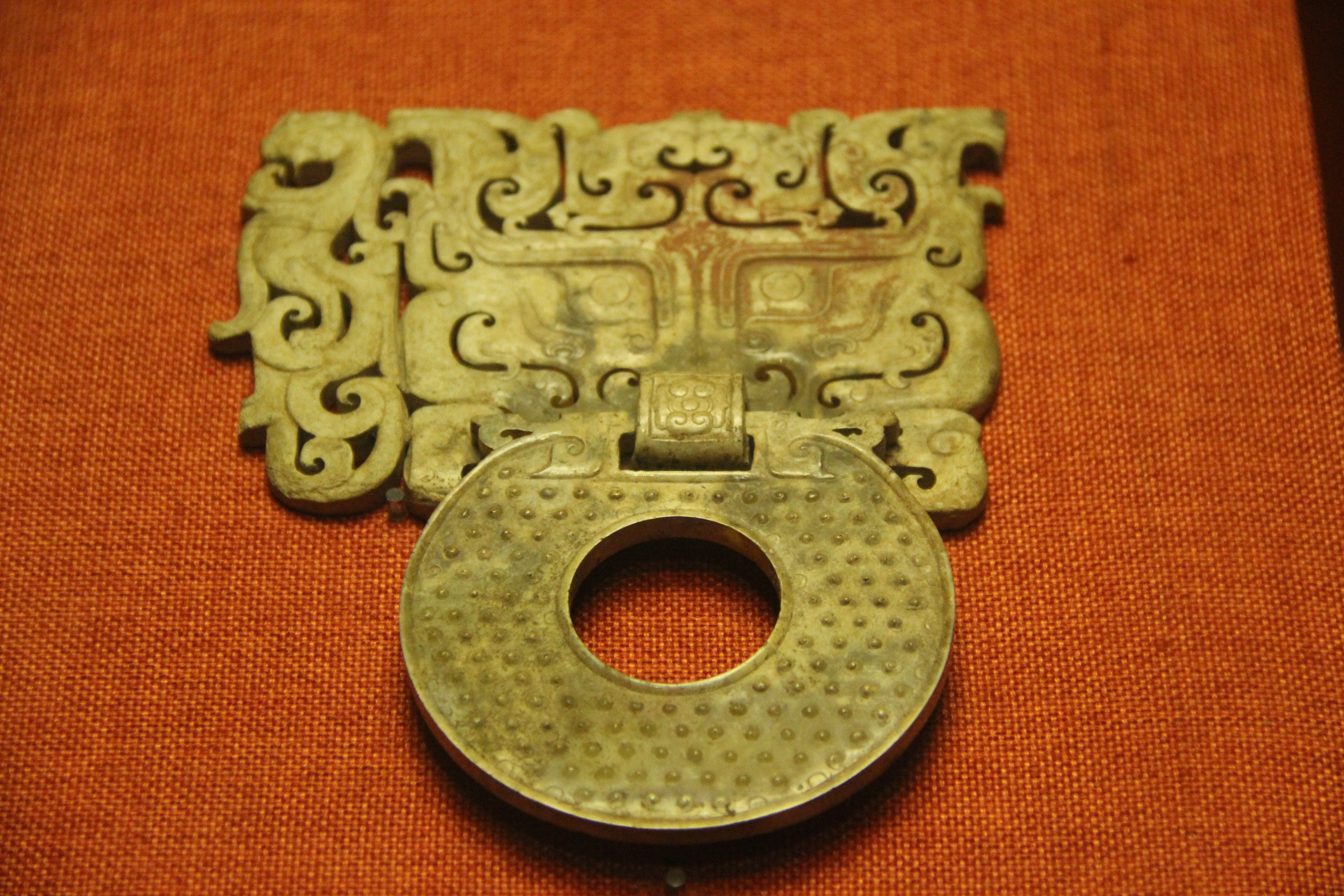
Ancient Chinese volutes and mascaron on an ornamental handle of a bi disc, c.100 BC, jade, Museum of the Mausoleum of the Nanyue King, Guangzhou, Guangdong, China

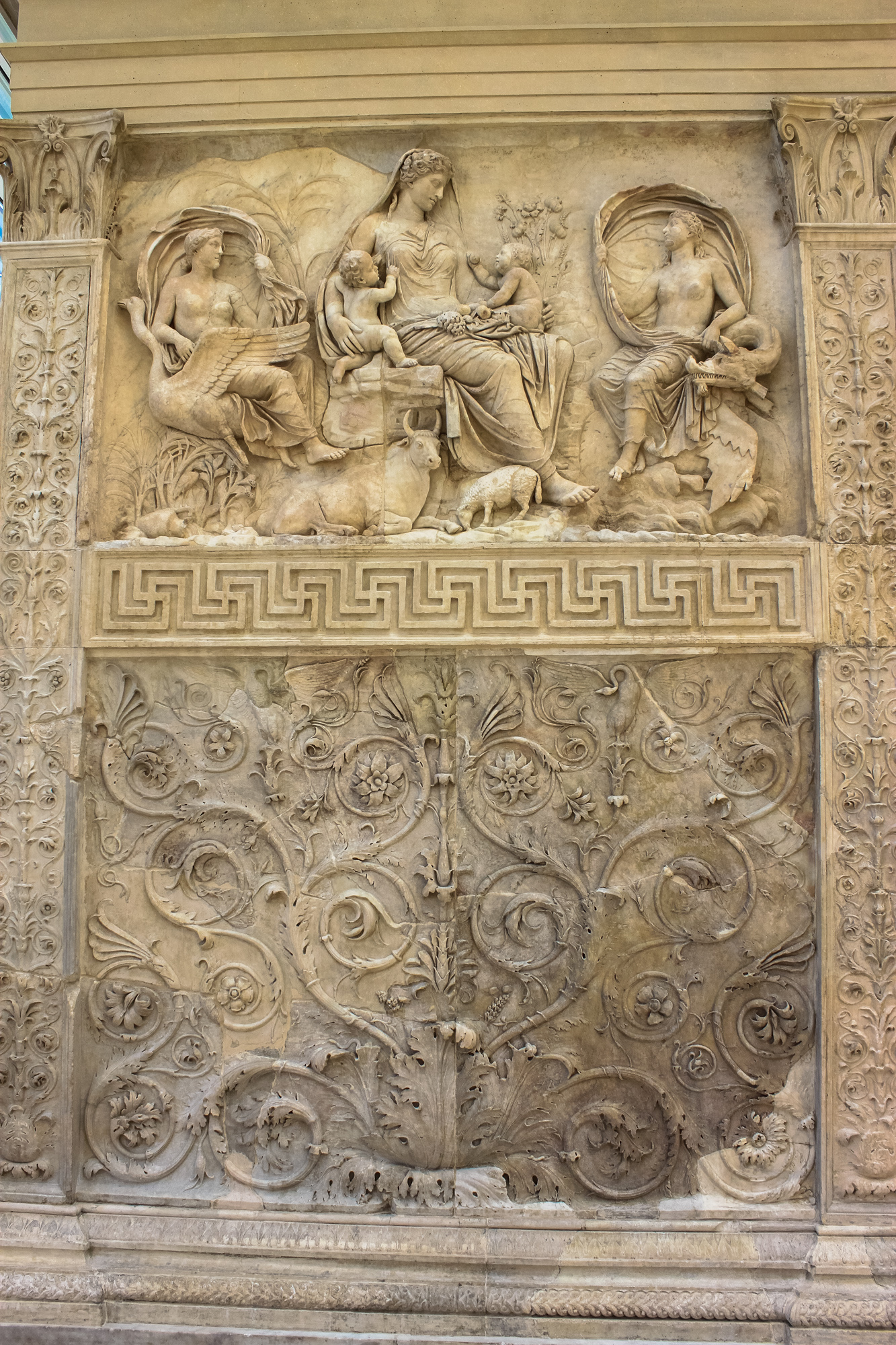
Roman foliage volutes in an arabesque on the Ara Pacis, Rome, unknown architect and sculptors, 13-9 BC

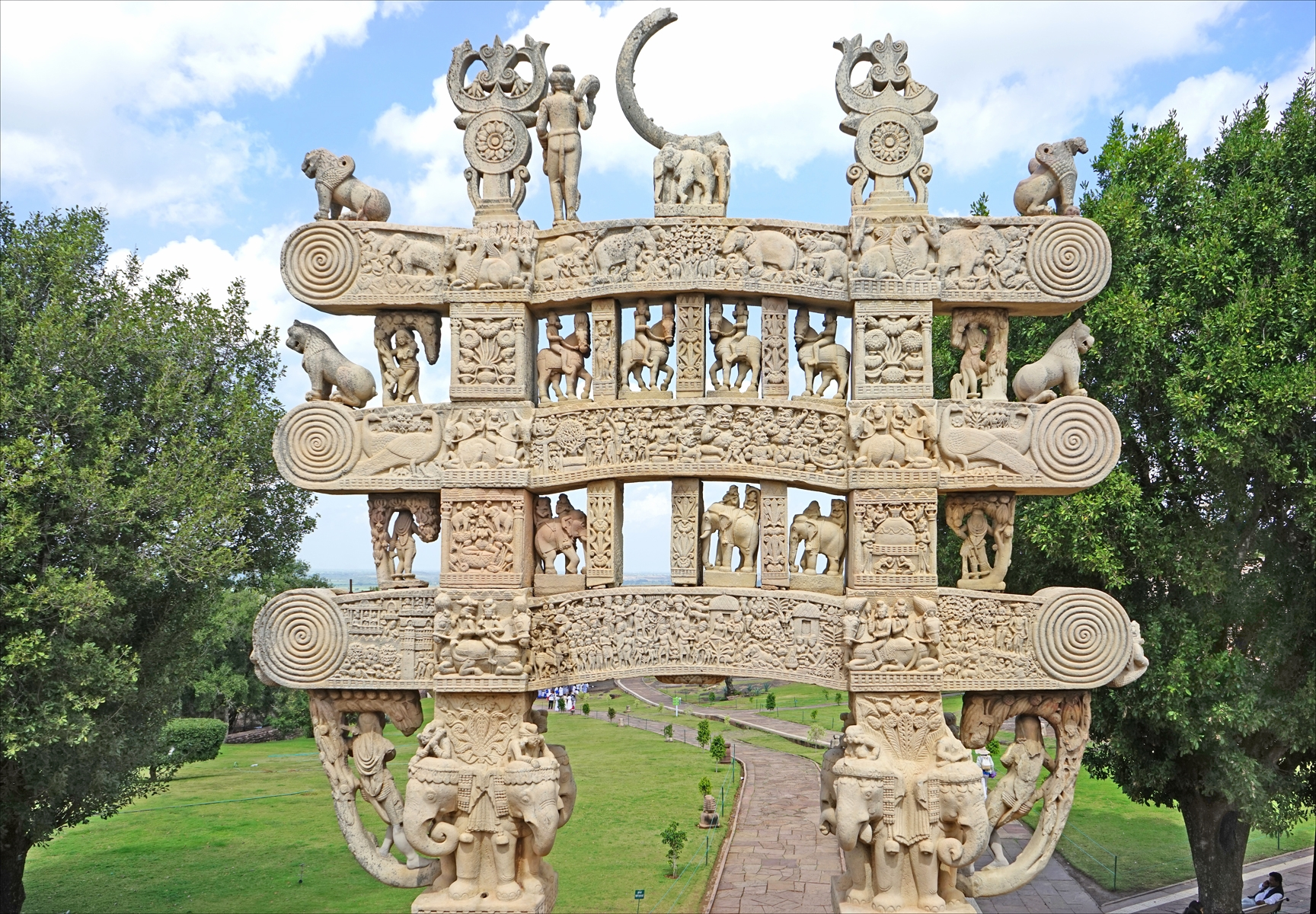
Buddhist volutes on the Great Stupa of Sanchi (Madhya Pradesh, India), unknown architect, 3rd century-c.100 BC

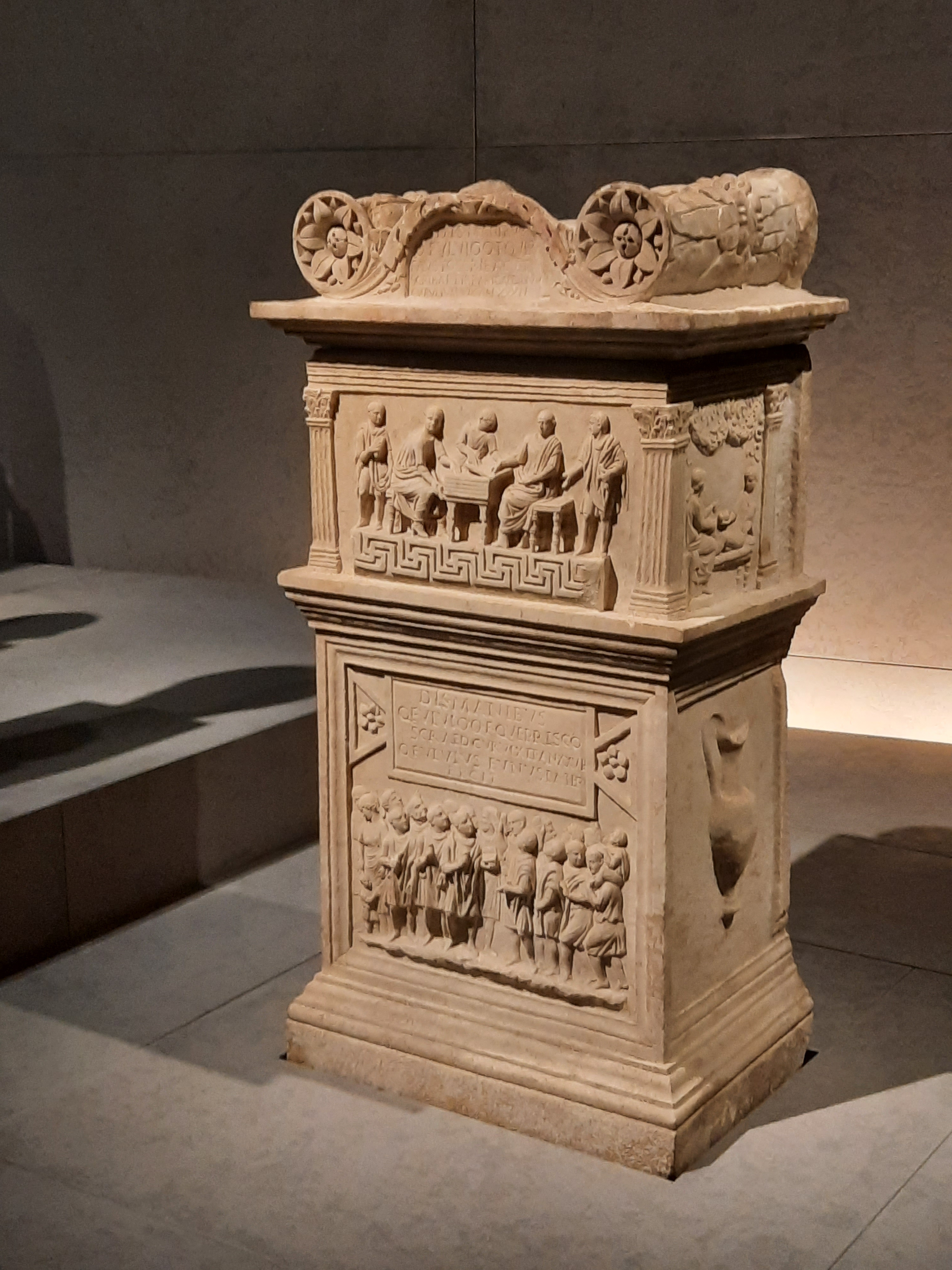
Roman volutes at the top of a funerary altar, 25-50 AD, marble, Terme di Diocleziano, Rome

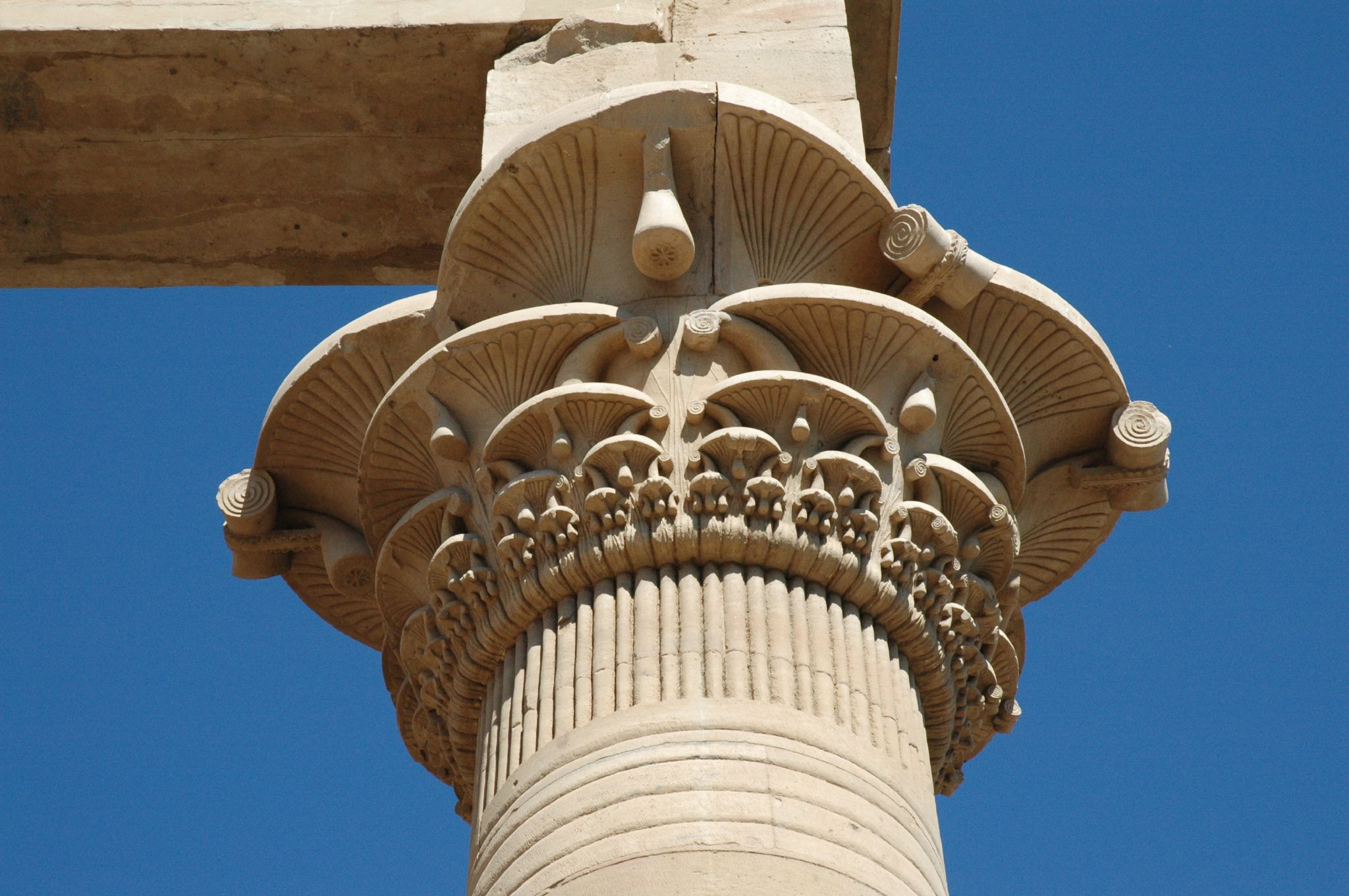
Ancient Egyptian volutes on a Composite capital from Trajan's Kiosk, Agilkia Island, Egypt, 98-117, unknown architect

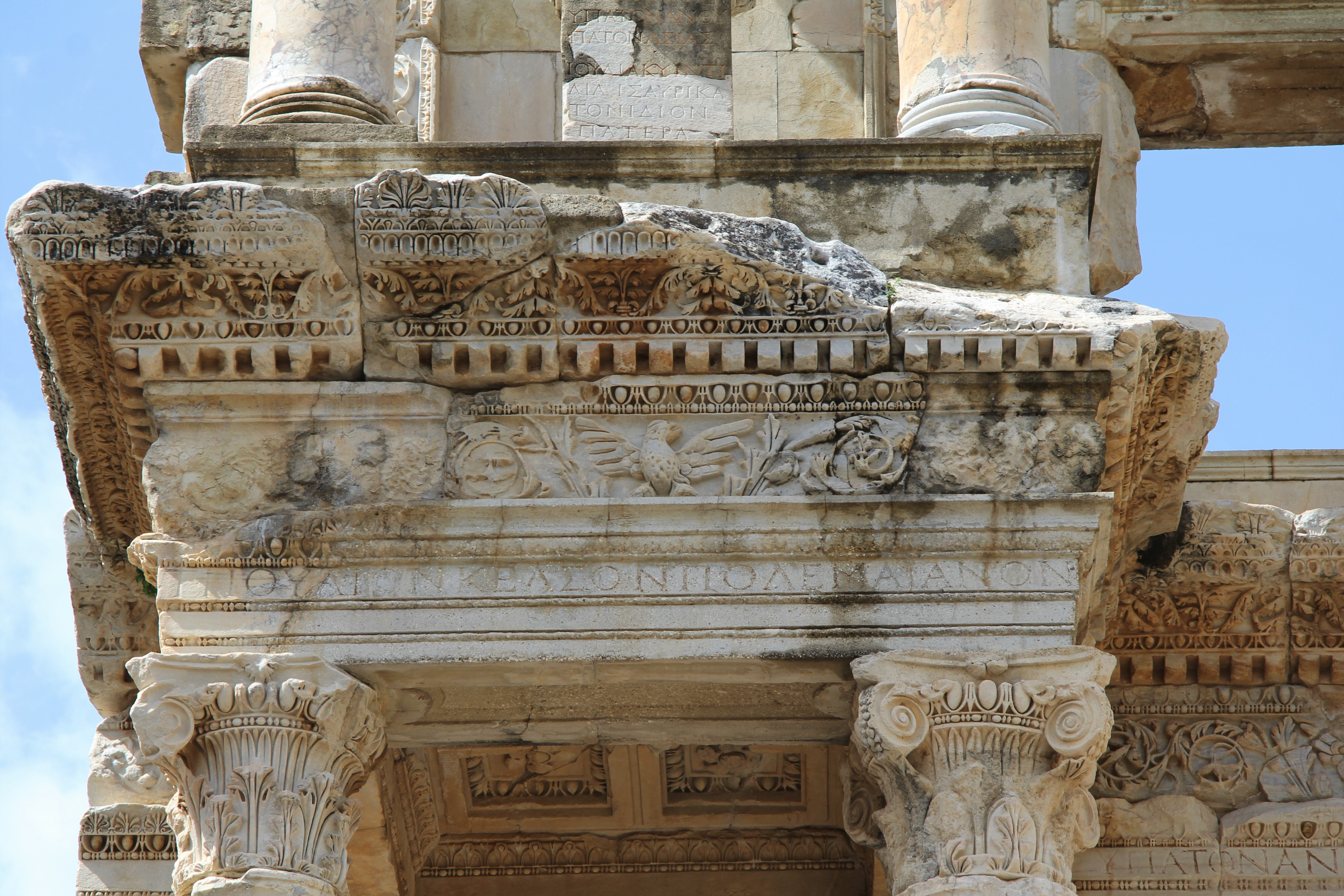
Roman volutes of Composite capitals of the Library of Celsus, Ephesus, Turkey, unknown architect, c.110

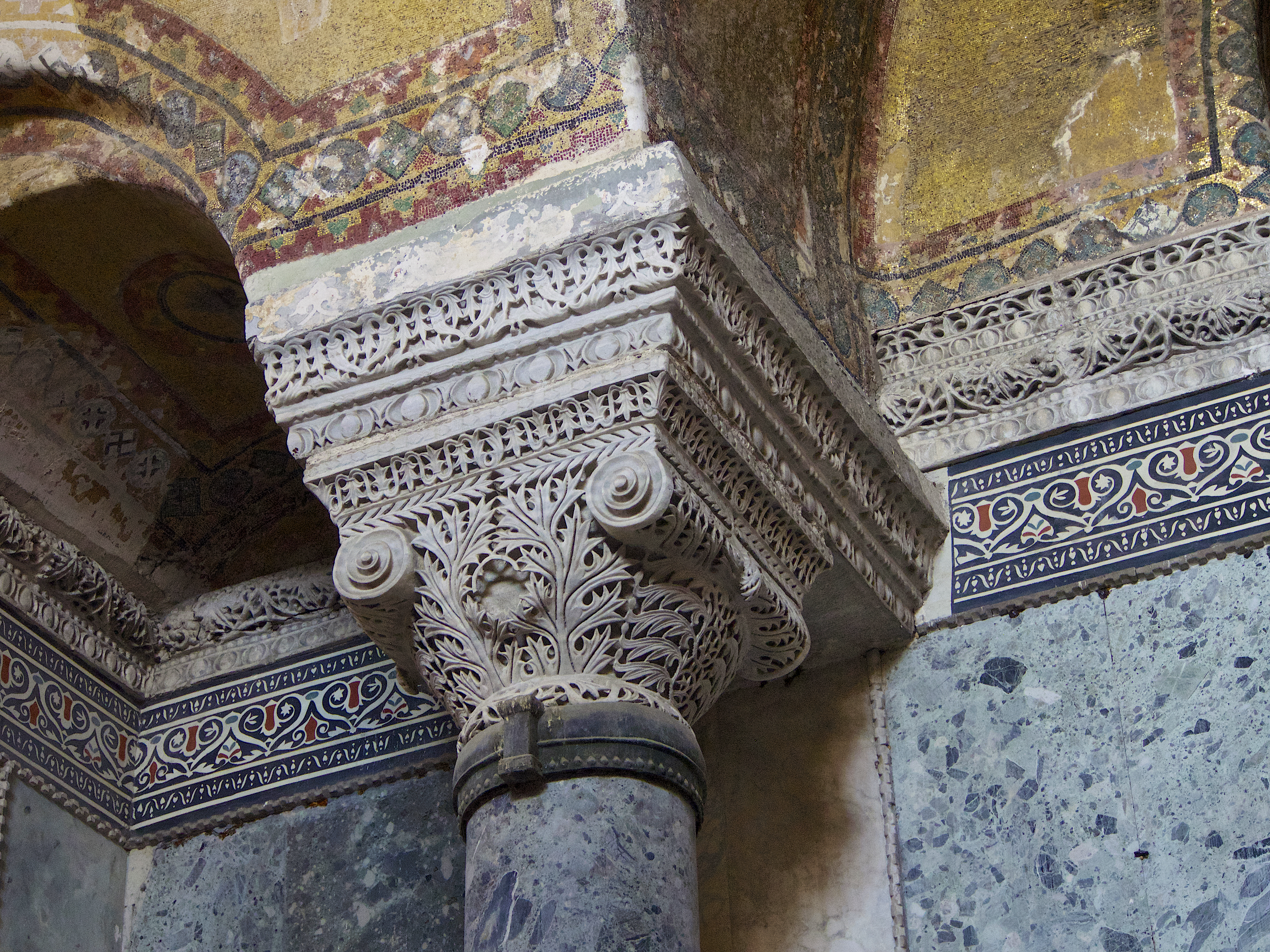
Byzantine volutes of an Ionic capital in the Hagia Sophia, Istanbul, Turkey, by Anthemius of Tralles or Isidore of Miletus, 6th century

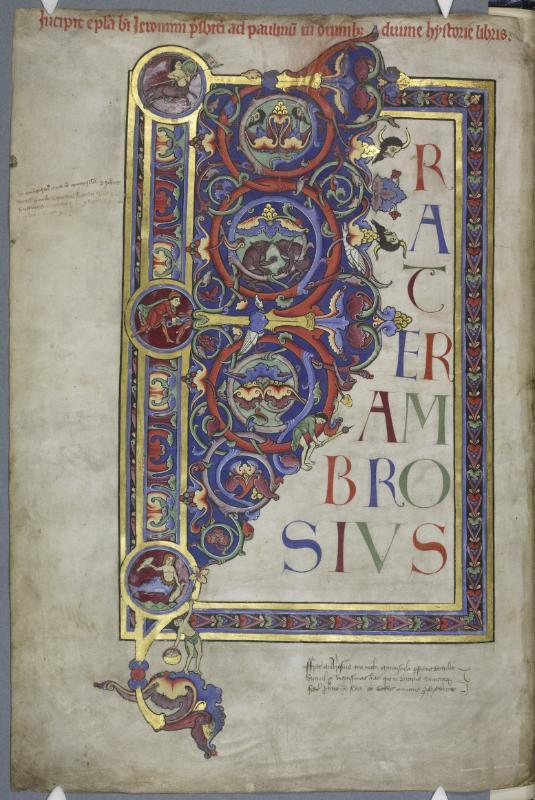
Romanesque foliage volutes on a page from the Bury Bible, by Master Hugo, c.1135-1140, illumination on parchment, Corpus Christi College, University of Cambridge, the UK

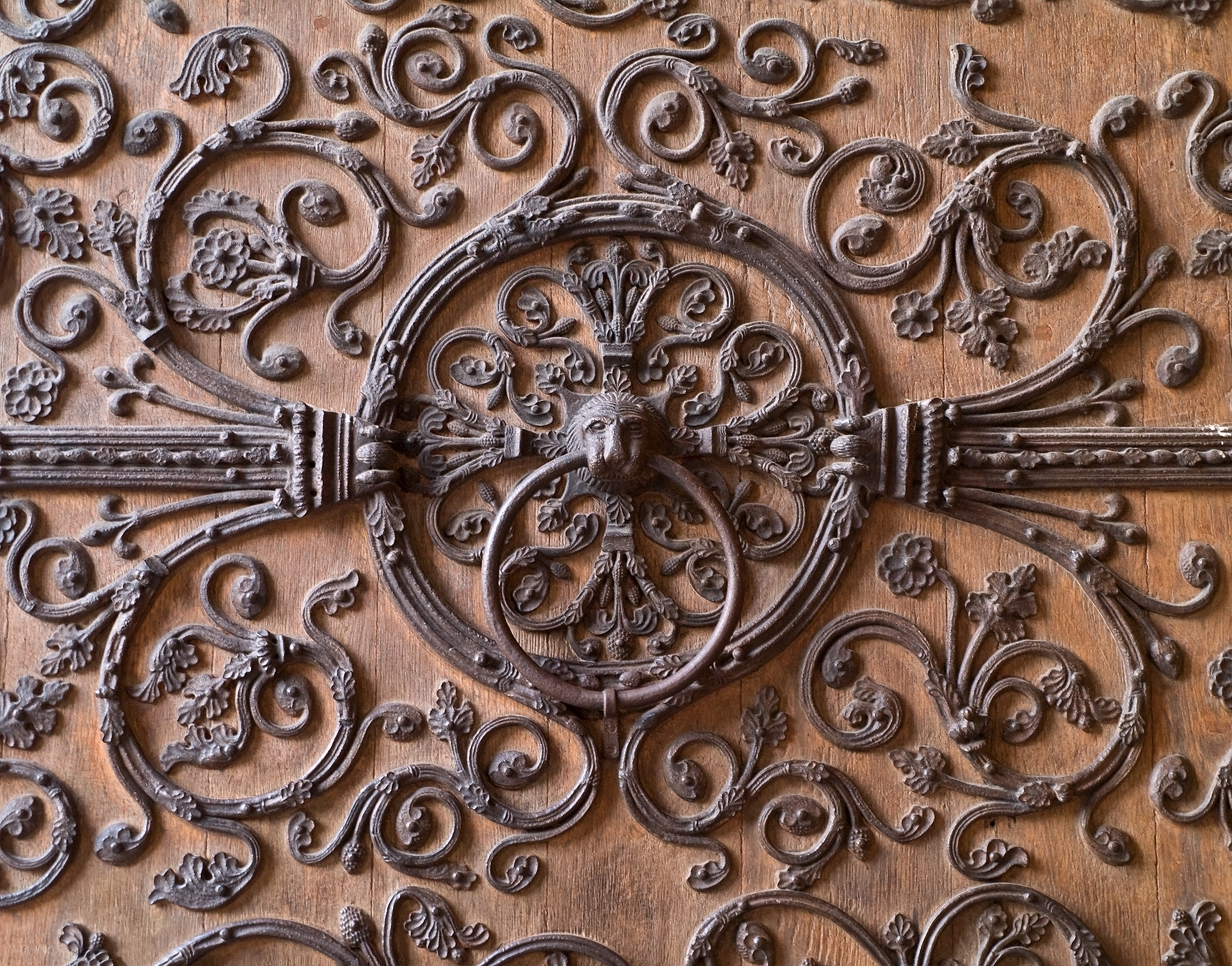
Gothic volutes on the wrought-iron on a door of Notre Dame de Paris, unknown architect or blacksmith, 12th or 13th centuries

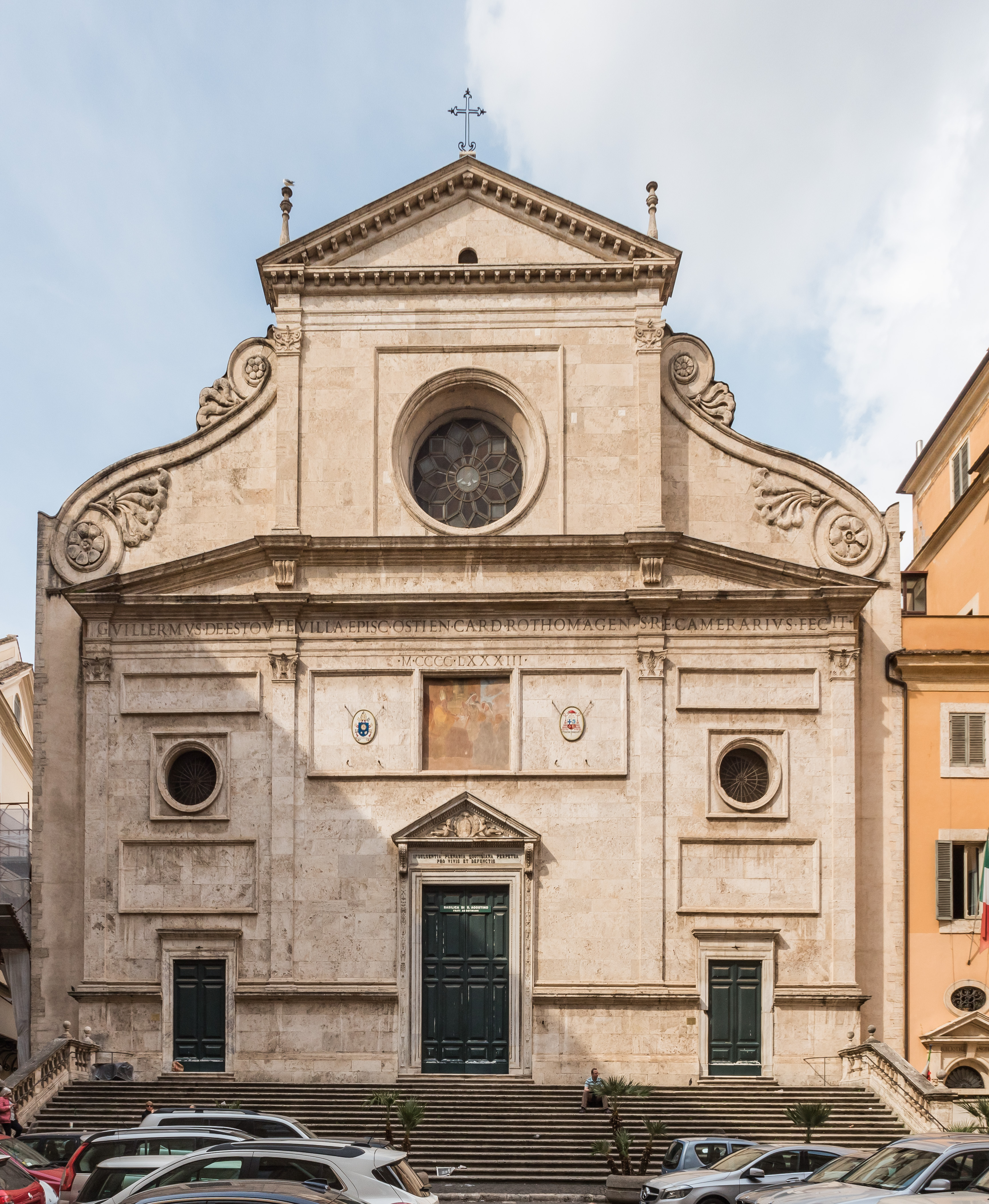
Renaissance volutes of the Sant'Agostino, Rome, by multiple architects, 1483

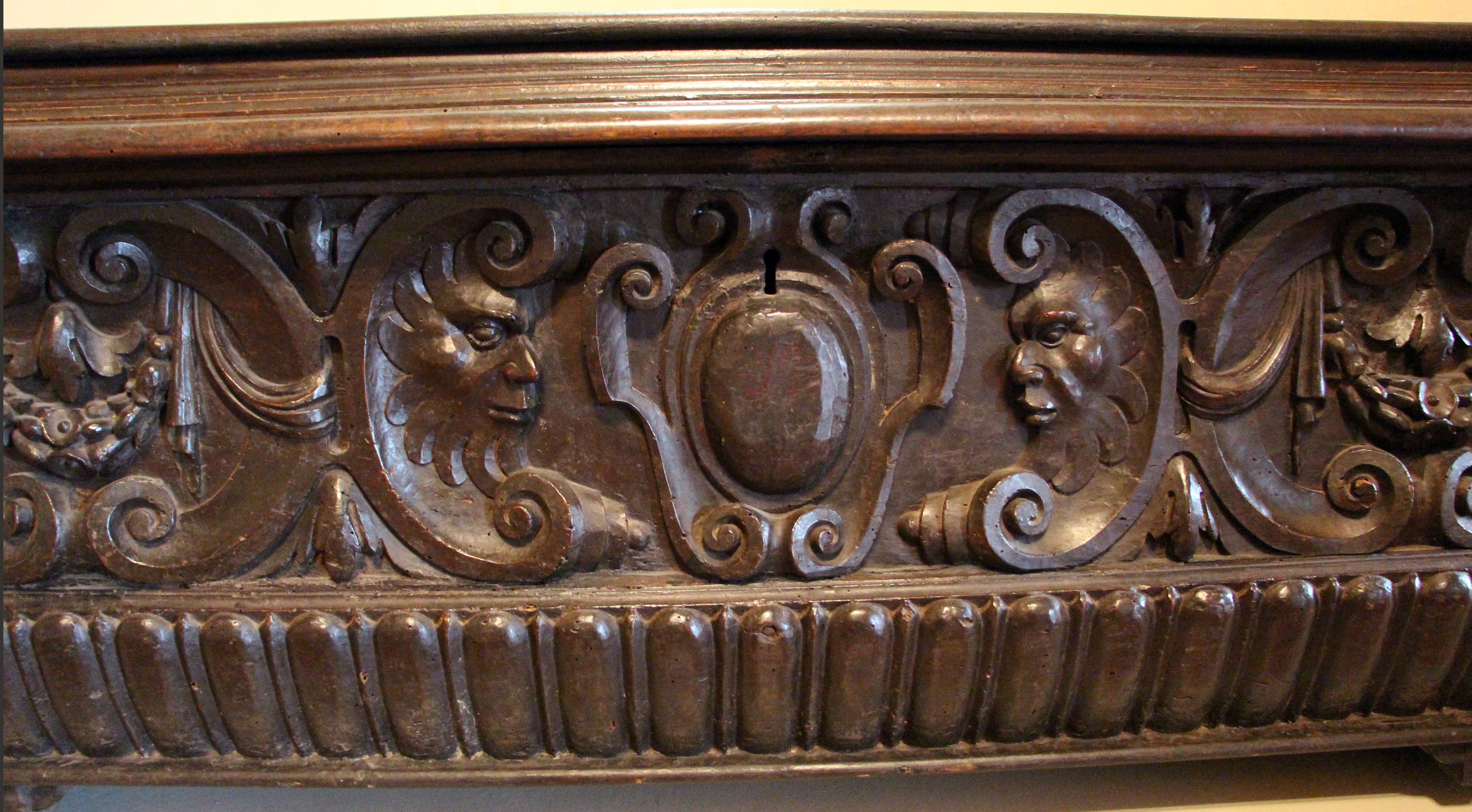
Renaissance volutes on a cassone, 16th century, most probably walnut, Villa medicea di Cerreto Guidi, Cerreto Guidi, Italy

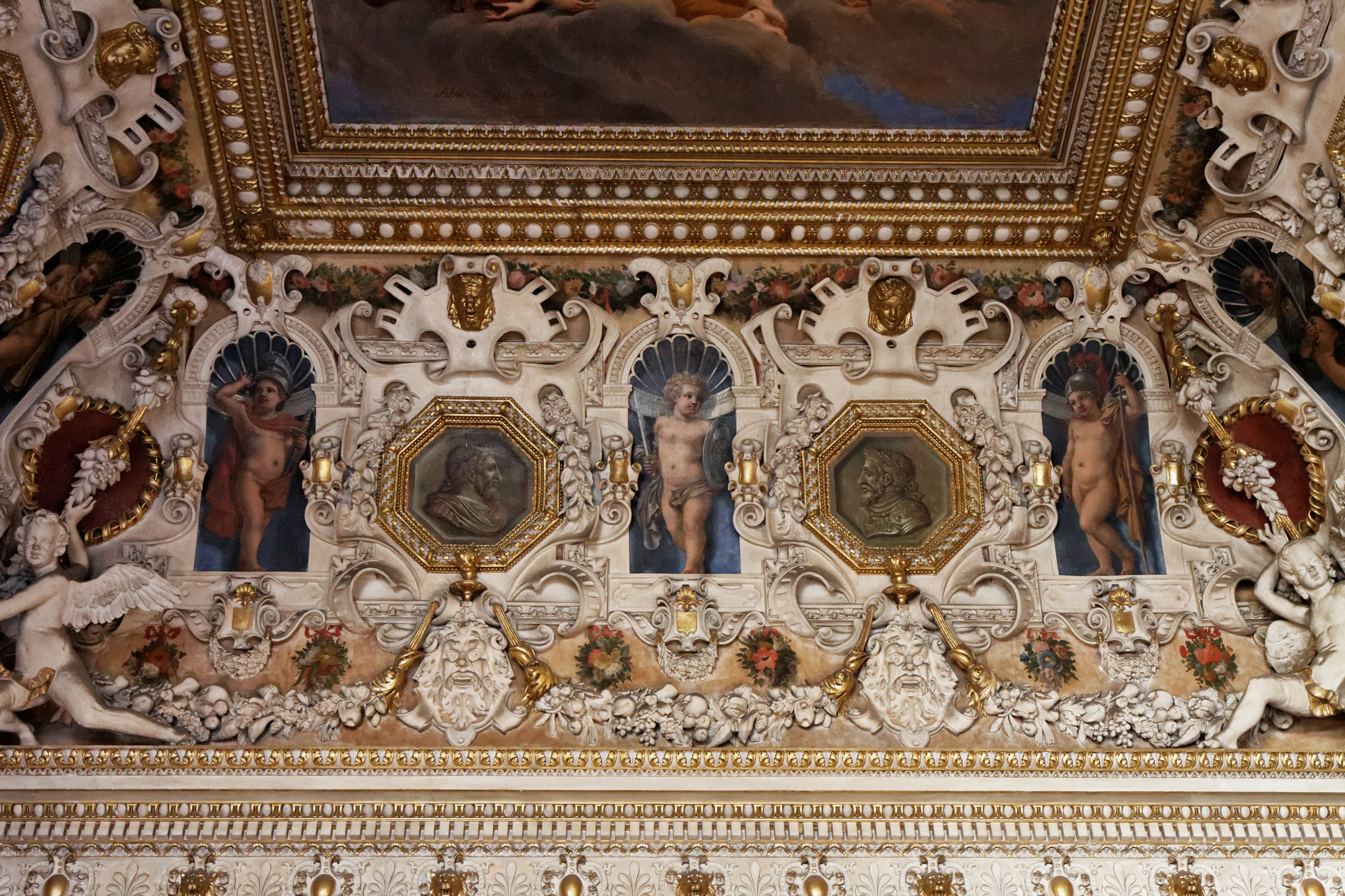
Renaissance stucco volutes on the ceiling from the King's Staircase, Palace of Fontainebleau, France, by Francesco Primaticcio, c.1541-1545

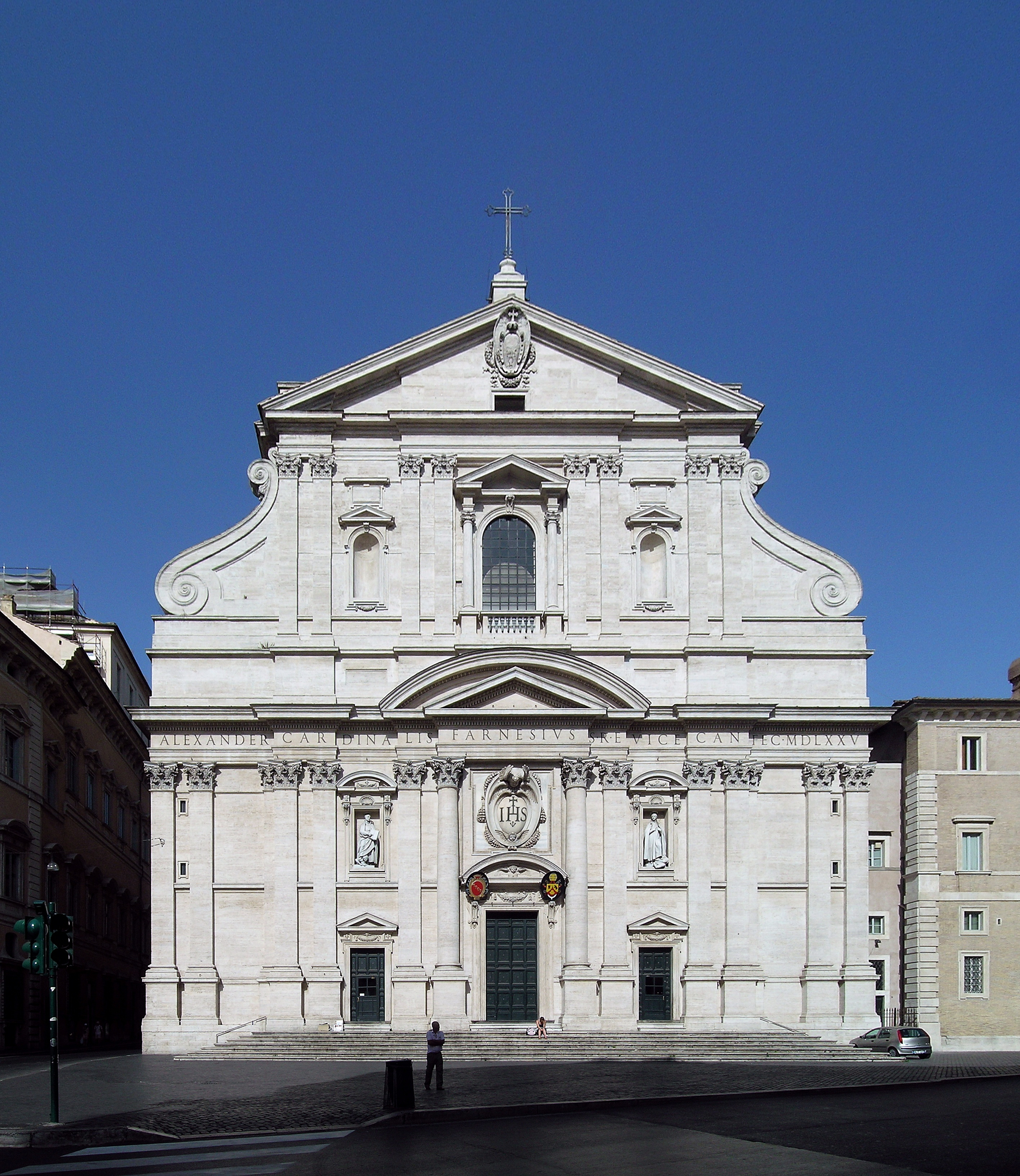
Baroque volutes on the upper part of the facade of the Church of the Gesù, Rome, by Giacomo della Porta, 1584

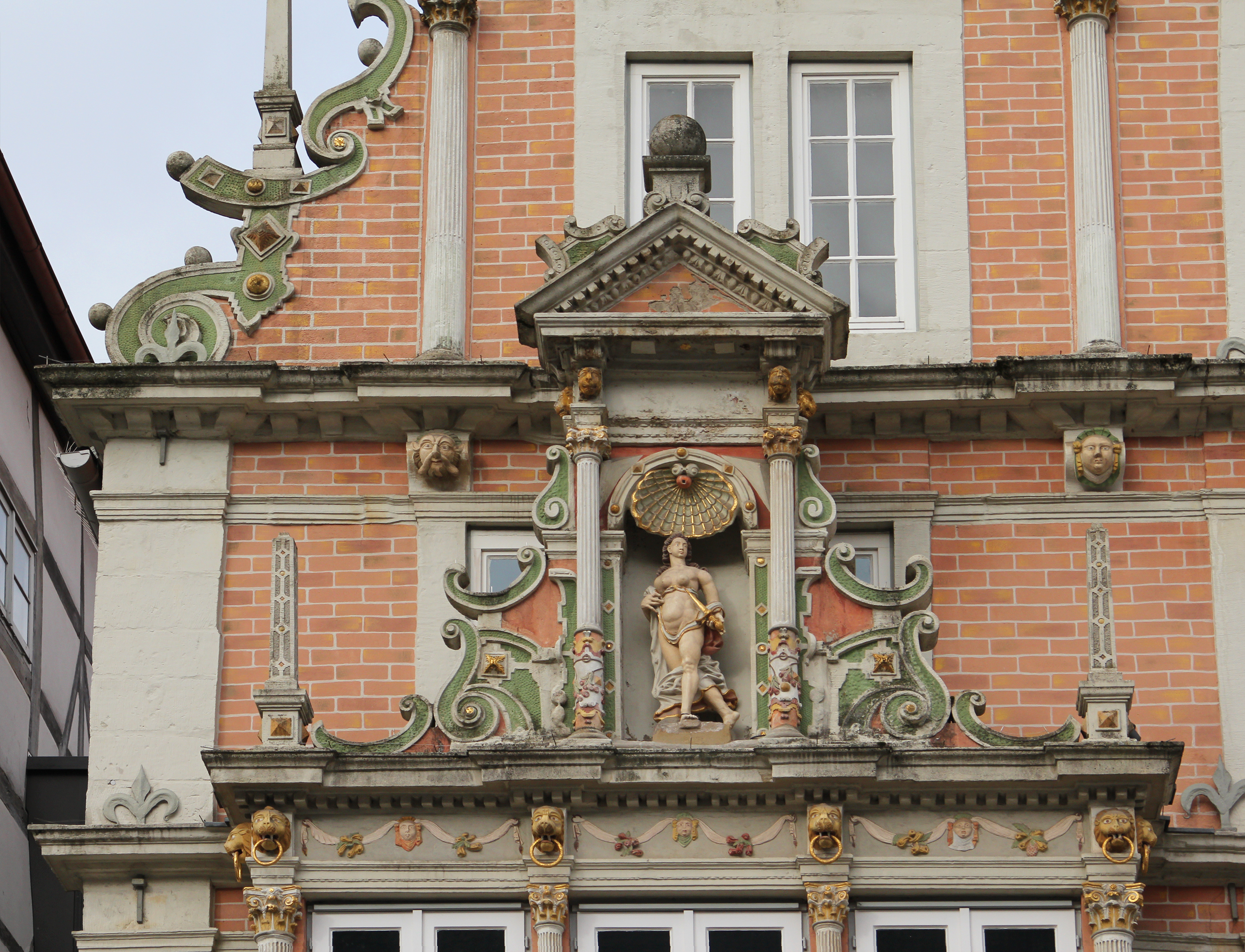
Northern Renaissance volutes on the Leisthaus, Hamelin, Germany, by the master builder Cord Tönnis, 1585-1589

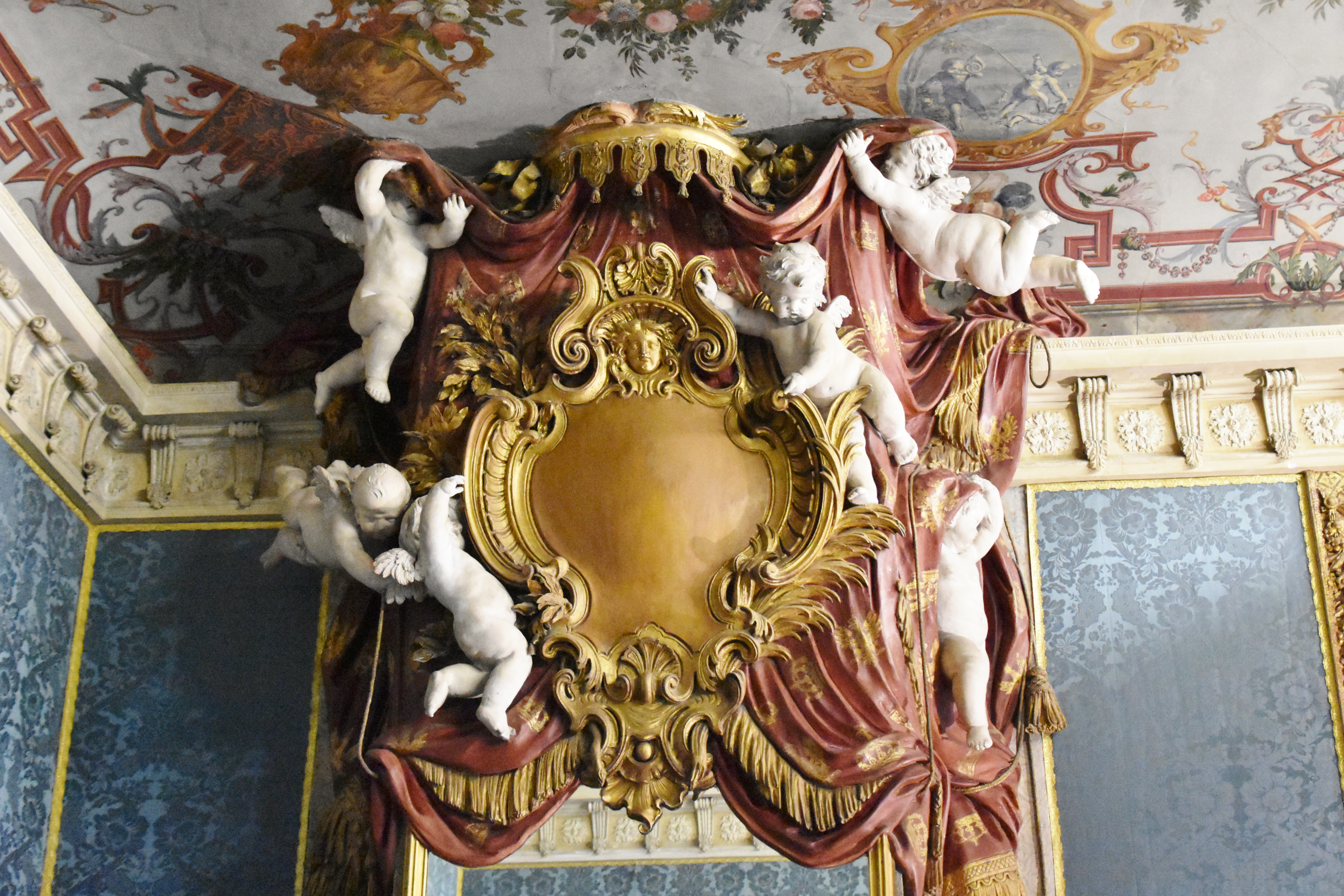
Baroque volutes of a cartouche with putti, above a mirror in the bedchamber of the Mecklenburg Apartment, Charlottenburg Palace, Berlin, unknown architect, 17th century

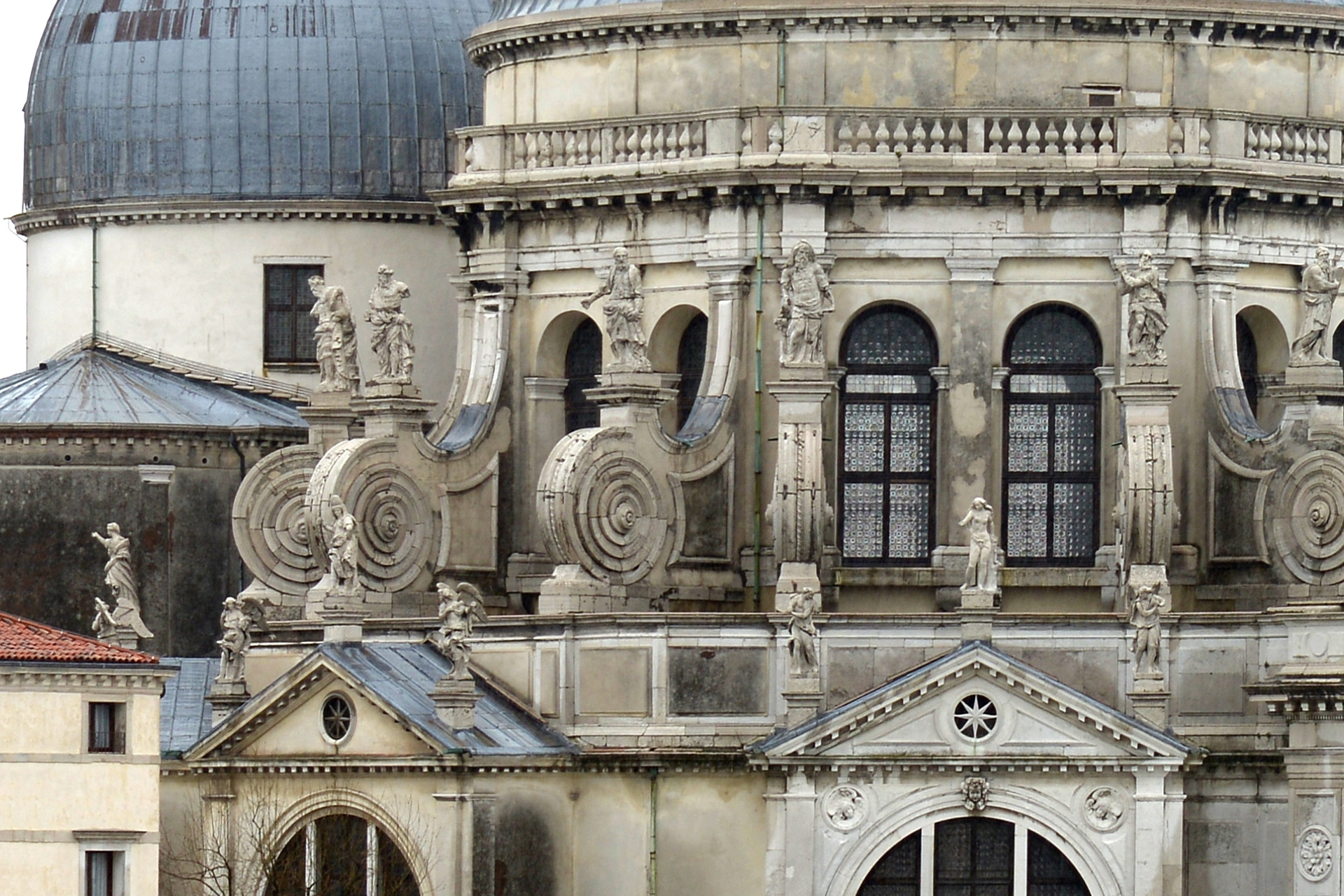
Baroque volutes on the Santa Maria della Salute, Venice, Italy, by Baldassare Longhena, 1631-1687

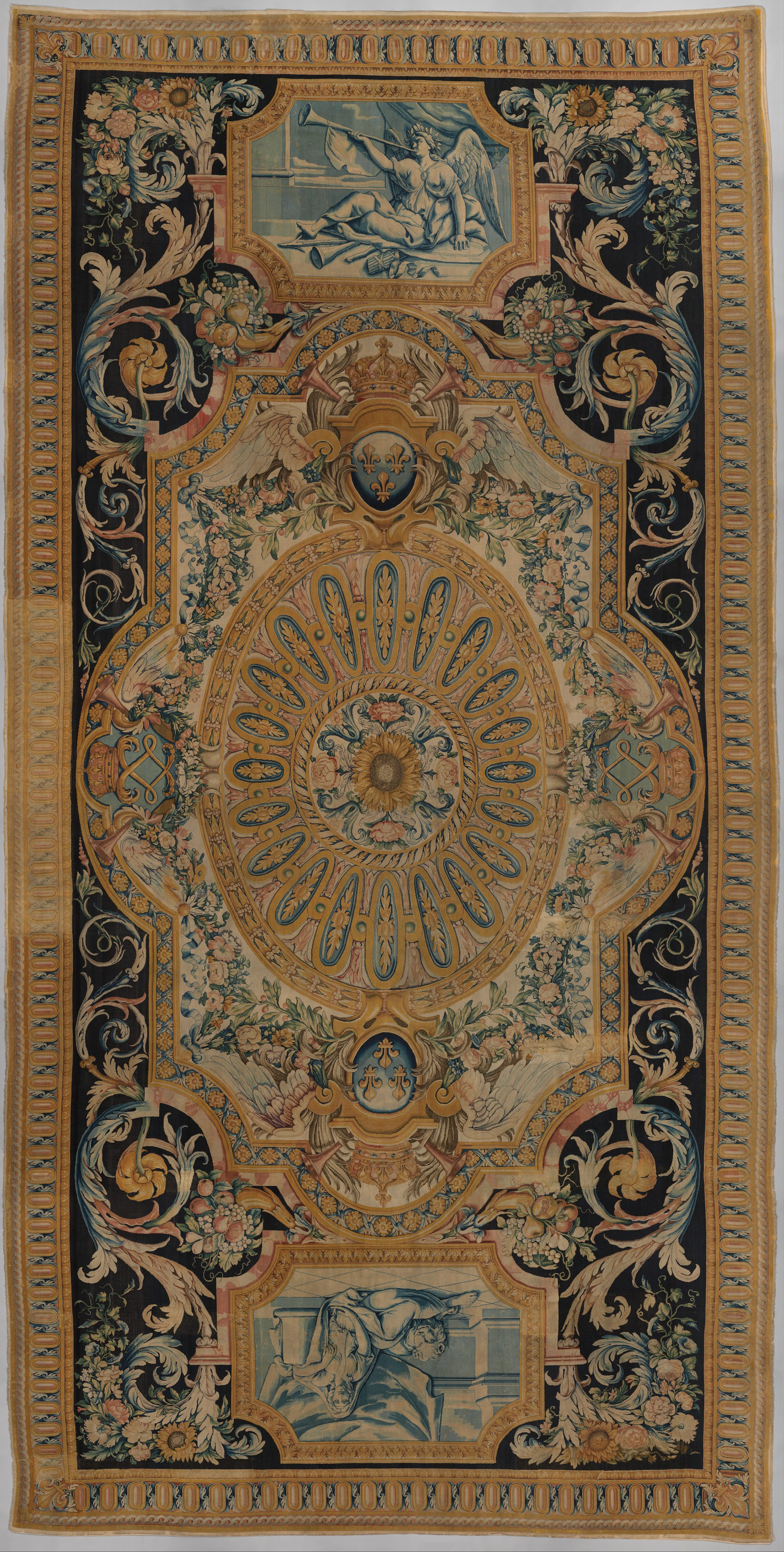
Baroque foliage volutes on a carpet with fame and fortitude, by the Savonnerie manufactory, 1668–1685, knotted and cut wool pile, woven with about 90 knots per square inch, Metropolitan Museum of Art

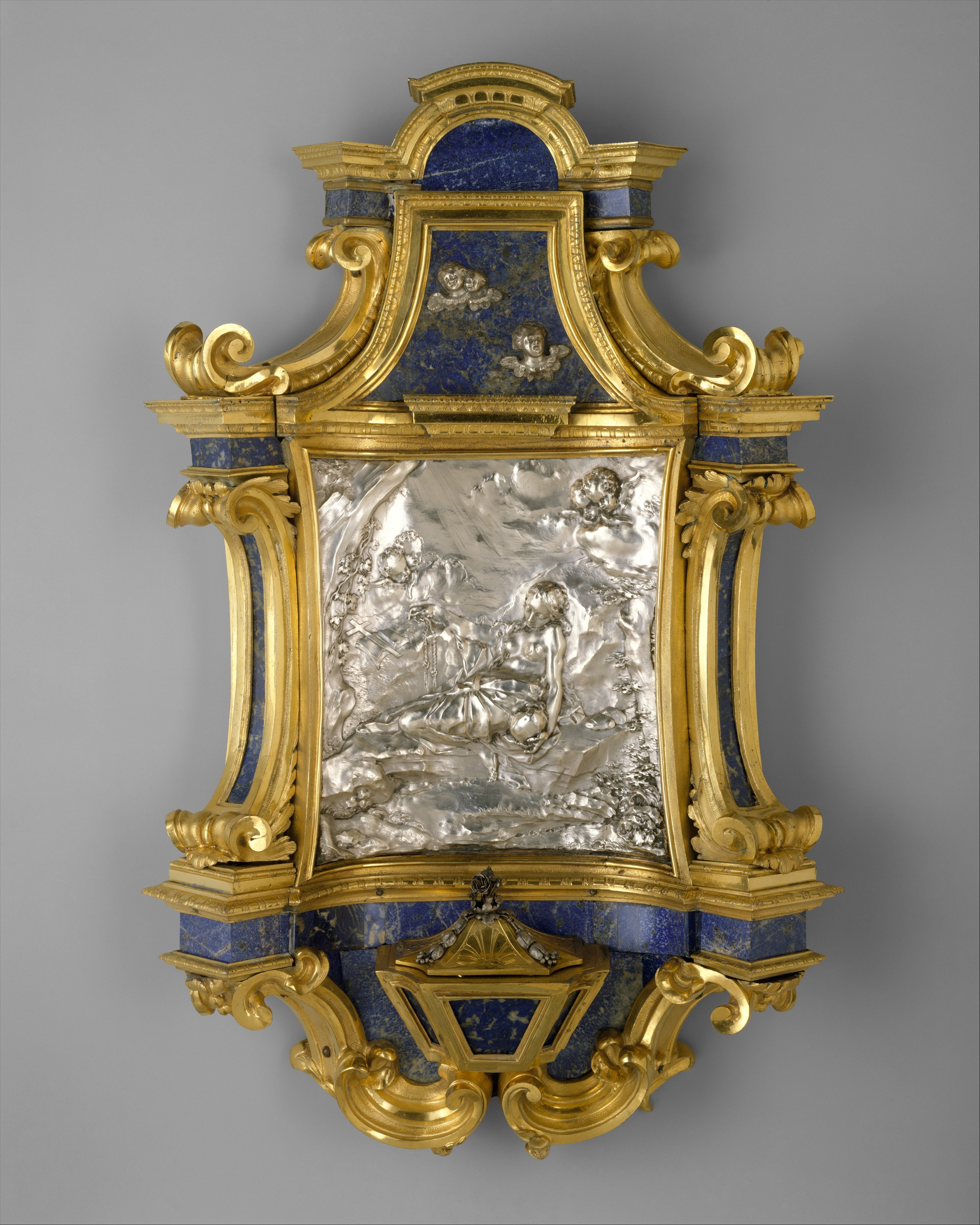
Baroque volutes on a holy-water stoup with relief of Mary of Egypt, by Giovanni Giardini and Benedetto Luti, c.1702, lapis lazuli, silver, and gilded bronze, Metropolitan Museum of Art

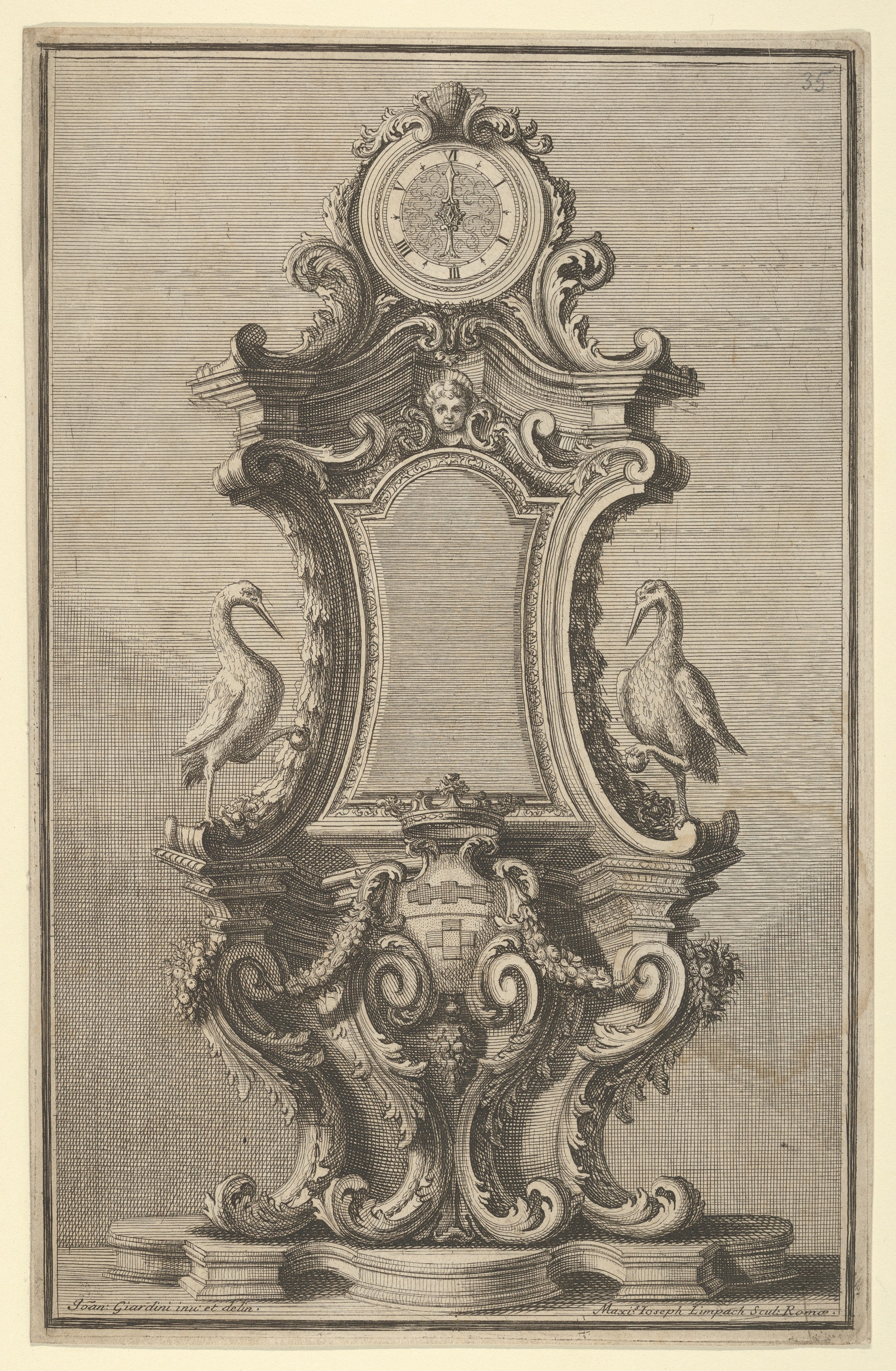
Baroque volutes on a design for a clock from 'Disegni Diversi', by Giovanni Giardini and Maximilian Joseph Limpach, 1714-1750, etching and engraving, Metropolitan Museum of Art

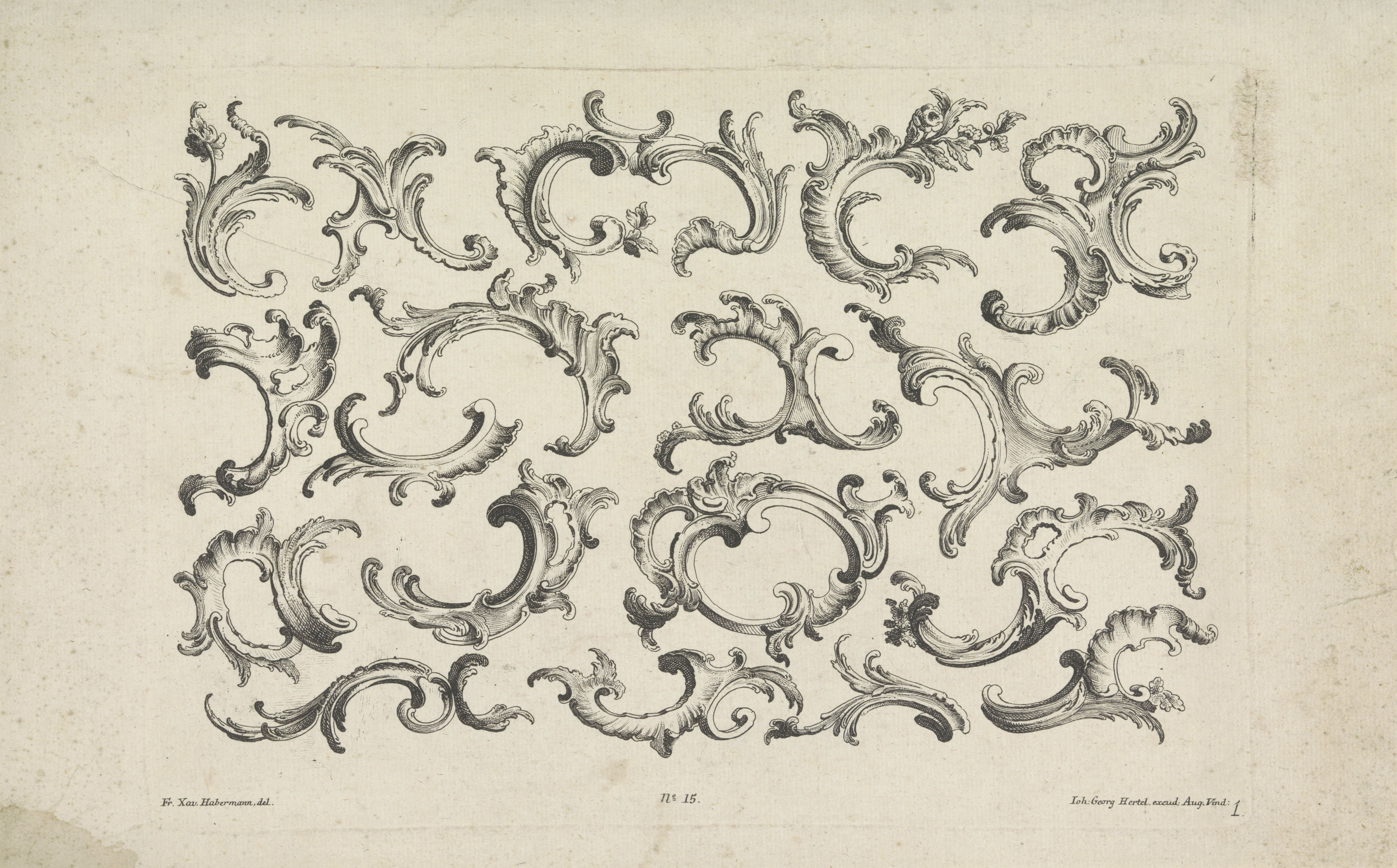
Combinations of Rococo C and S-shaped volutes, by Franz Xaver Habermann, 1731-1775, etching, Rijksmuseum, Amsterdam, the Netherlands

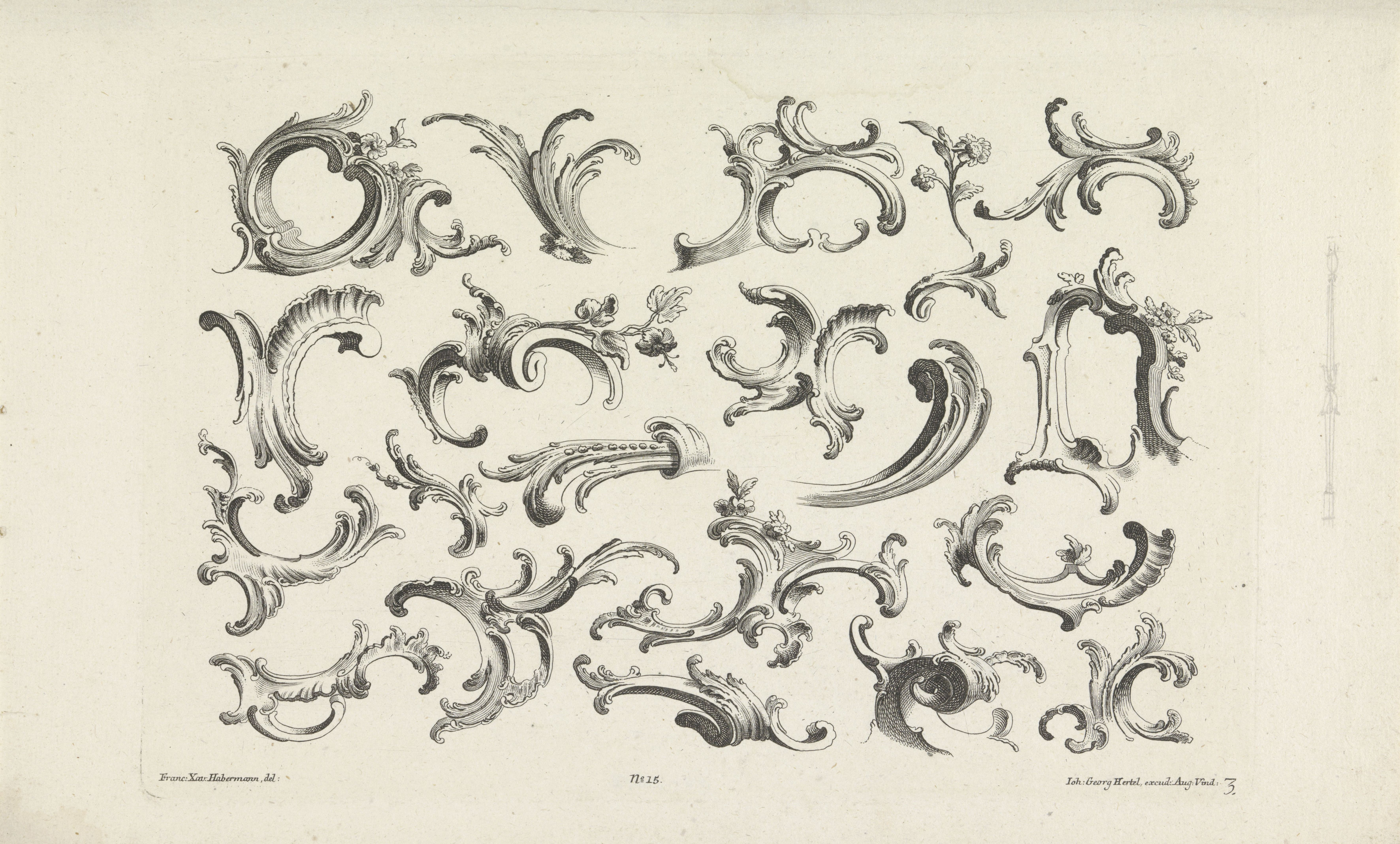
Combinations of Rococo C and S-shaped volutes, by Franz Xaver Habermann, 1731-1775, etching, Rijksmuseum

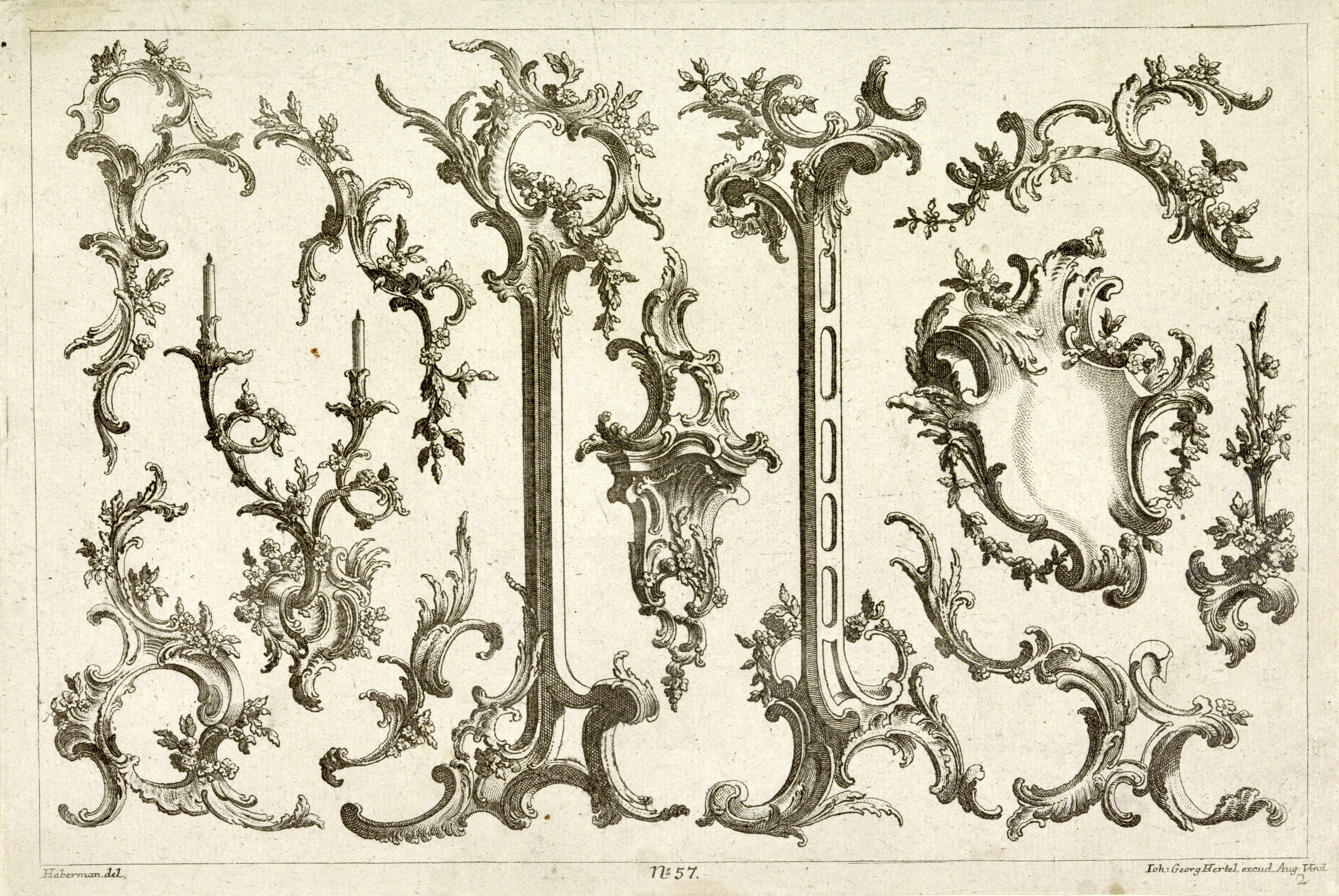
Combinations of Rococo C and S-shaped volutes, by Franz Xaver Habermann, 1731-1775, etching, Rijksmuseum

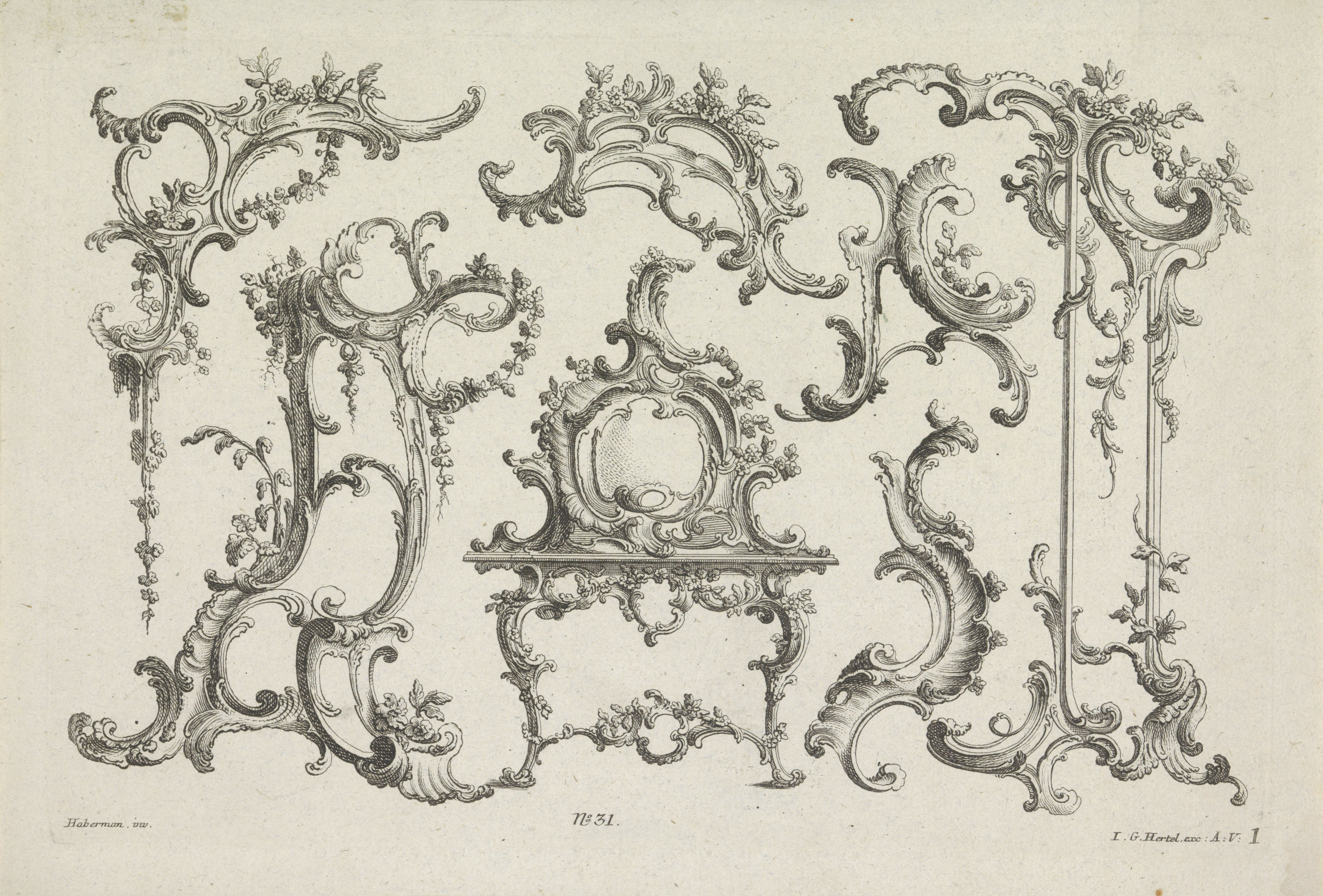
Combinations of Rococo C and S-shaped volutes, by Franz Xaver Habermann, 1731-1775, etching, Rijksmuseum

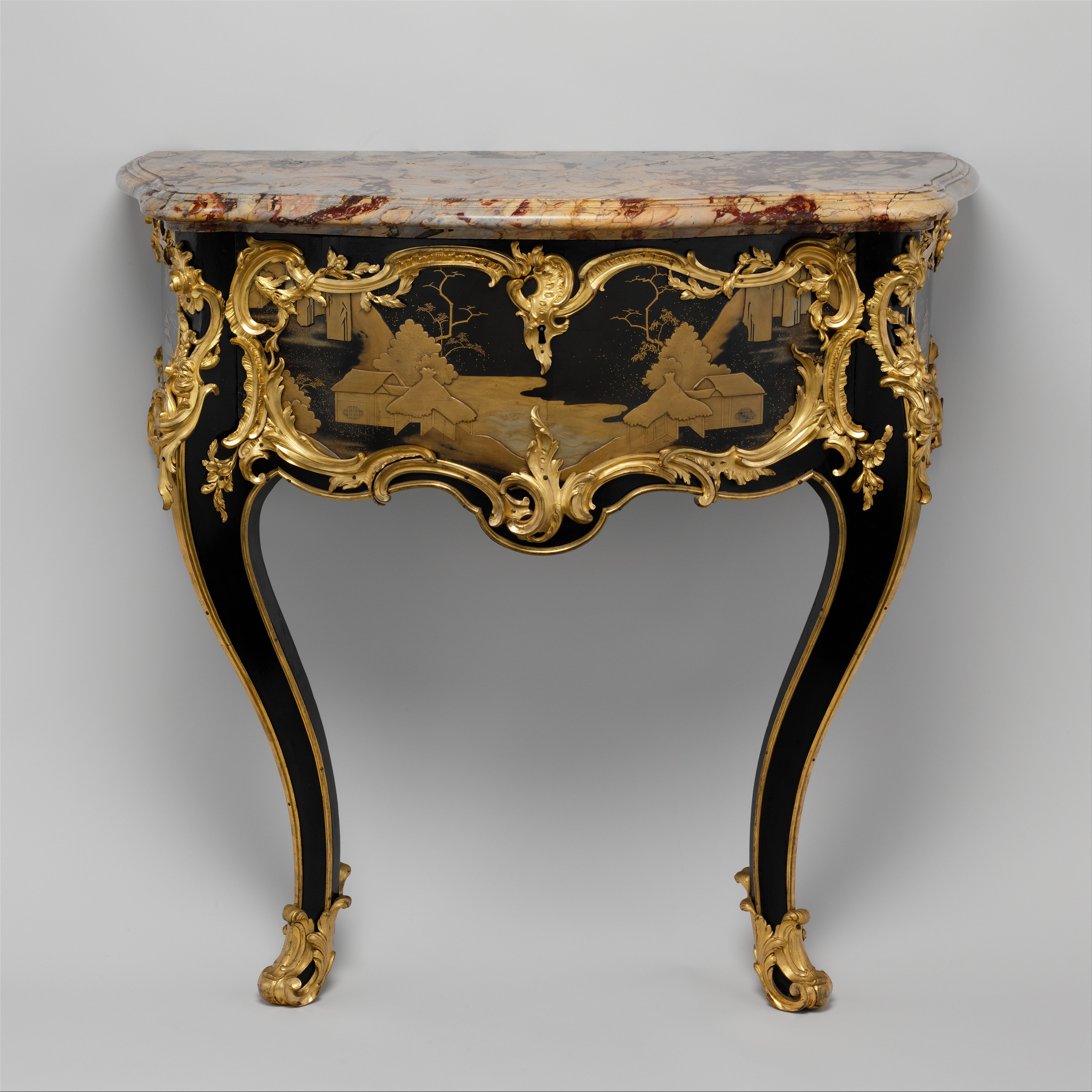
Rococo C and S-shaped volutes on a side table (commode en console), by Bernard II van Risamburgh, c.1755-1760, Japanese lacquer, gilt-bronze mounts and Sarrancolin marble top, Metropolitan Museum of Art

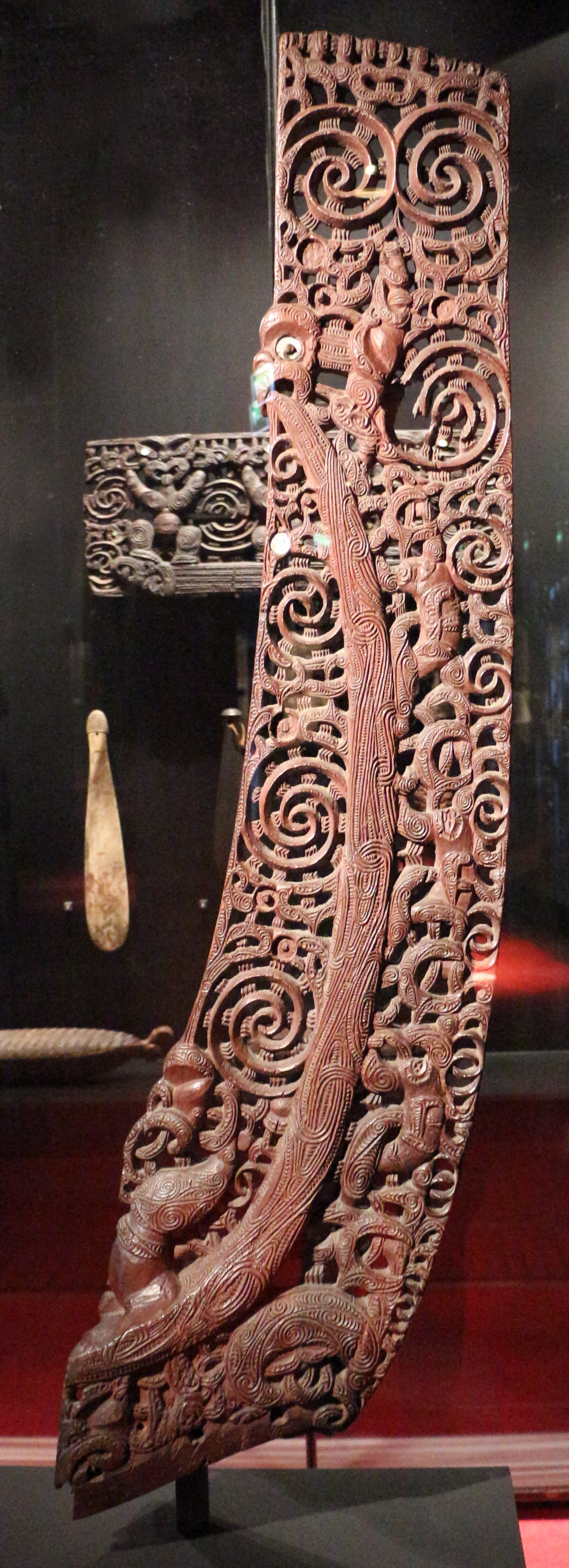
Māori volutes on a canoe sternpost, late 18th-early 19th century, wood and sheel, Musée du Quai Branly, Paris

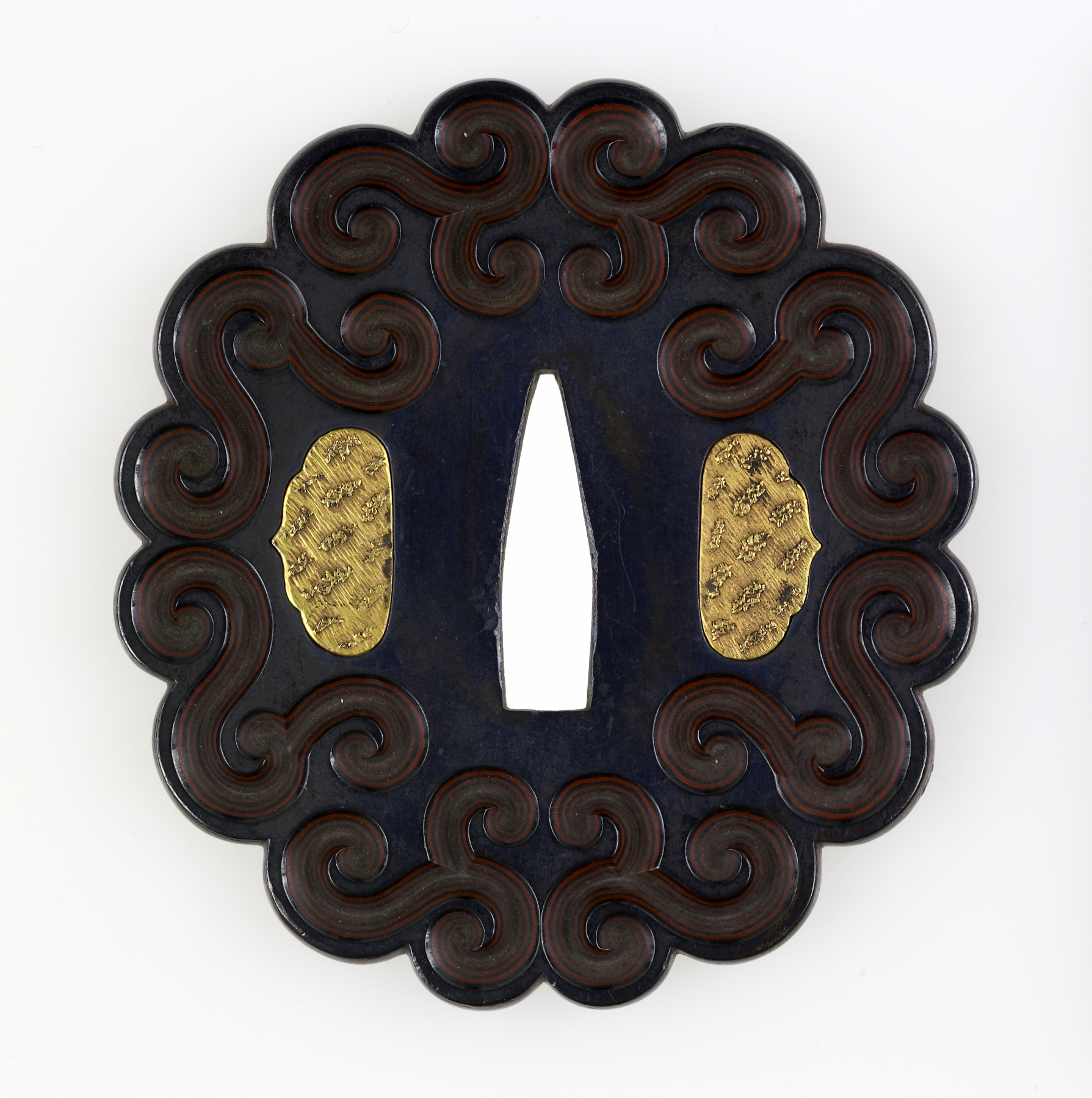
Japanese volutes on a tsuba, unknown date, shakudo and gold, Walters Art Museum

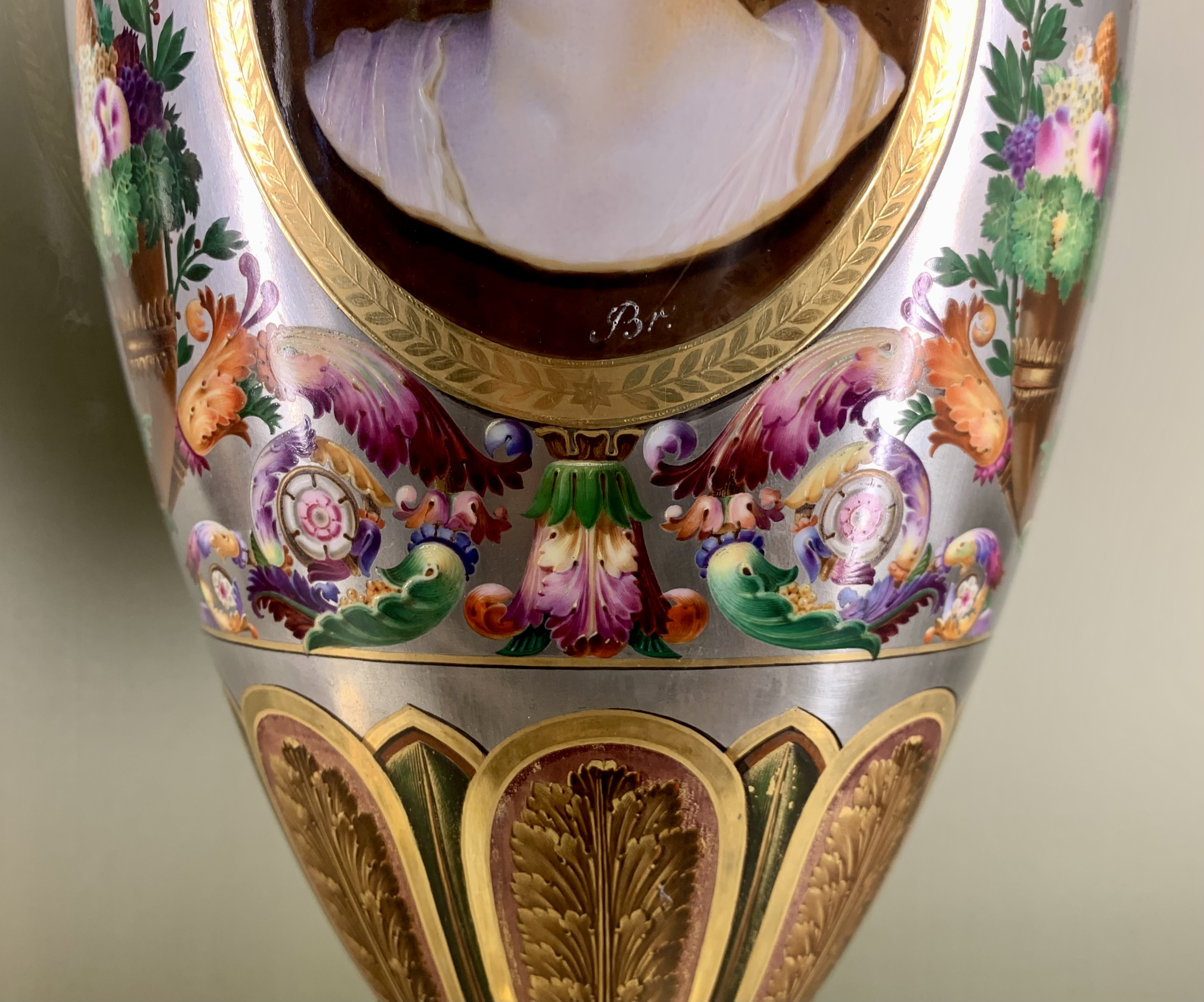
Neoclassical foliage volutes on a vase, by the Sèvres Porcelain Manufactory, 1814, hard-paste porcelain with platinum background and gilt bronze mounts, Louvre

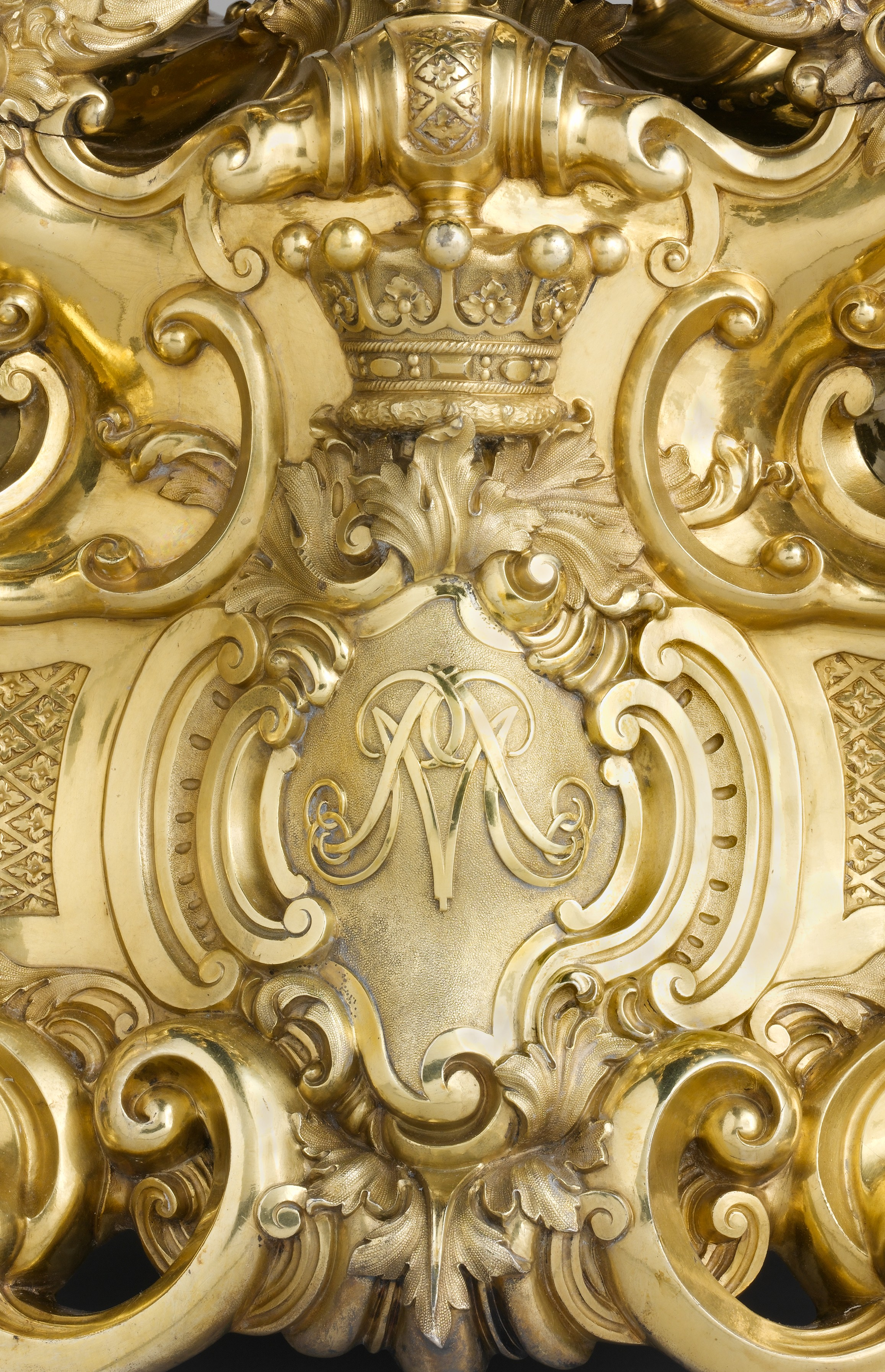
Rococo Revival C and S-shaped volutes of a cartouche on the base of a nine-light candelabrum, 1835–1836, gilded silver, Metropolitan Museum of Art

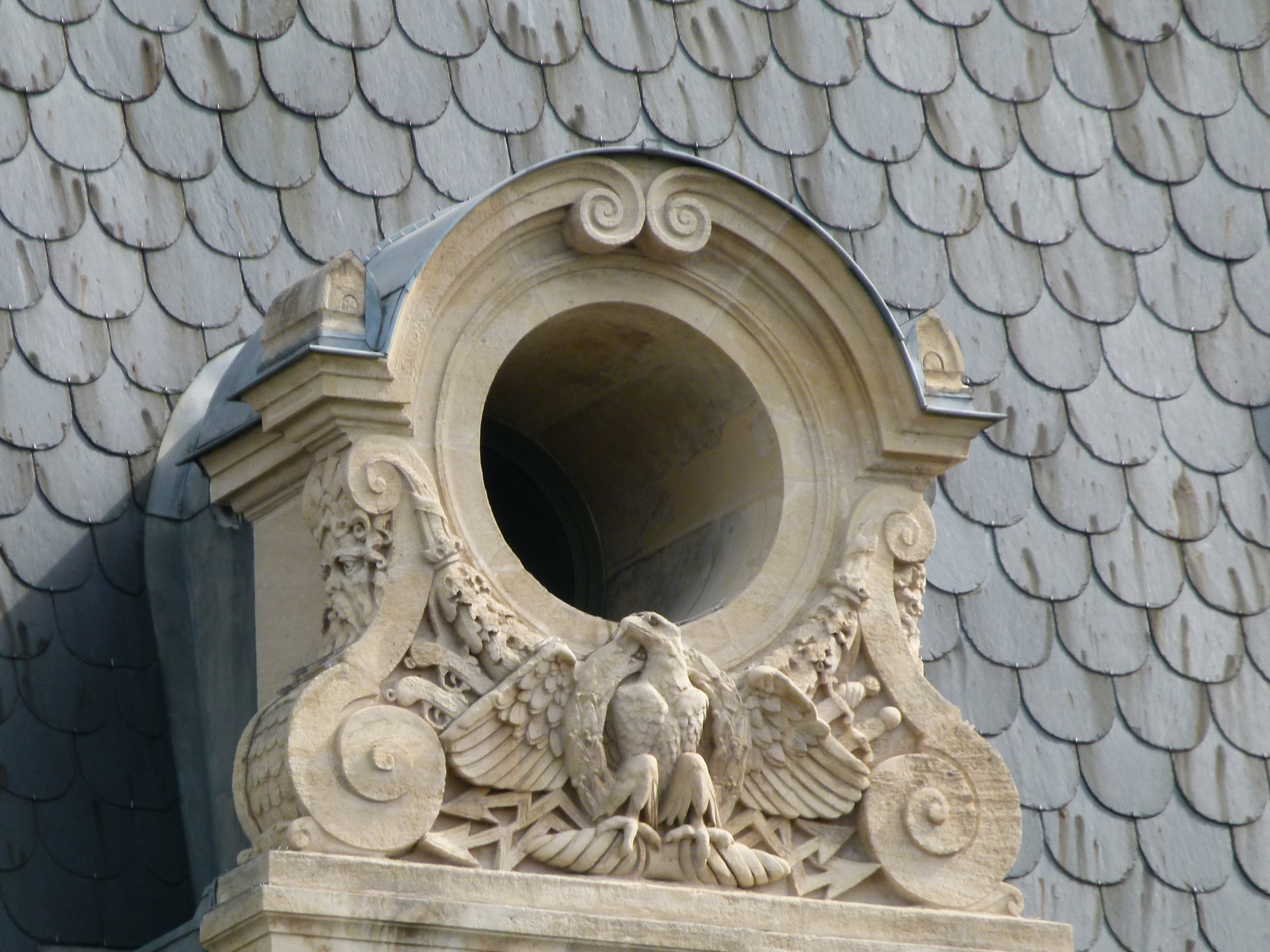
Baroque Revival volutes of a dormer window (oeil-de-boeuf type) on the building of préfecture de police de Paris, Île de la Cité, by Victor Calliat, mid-19th century

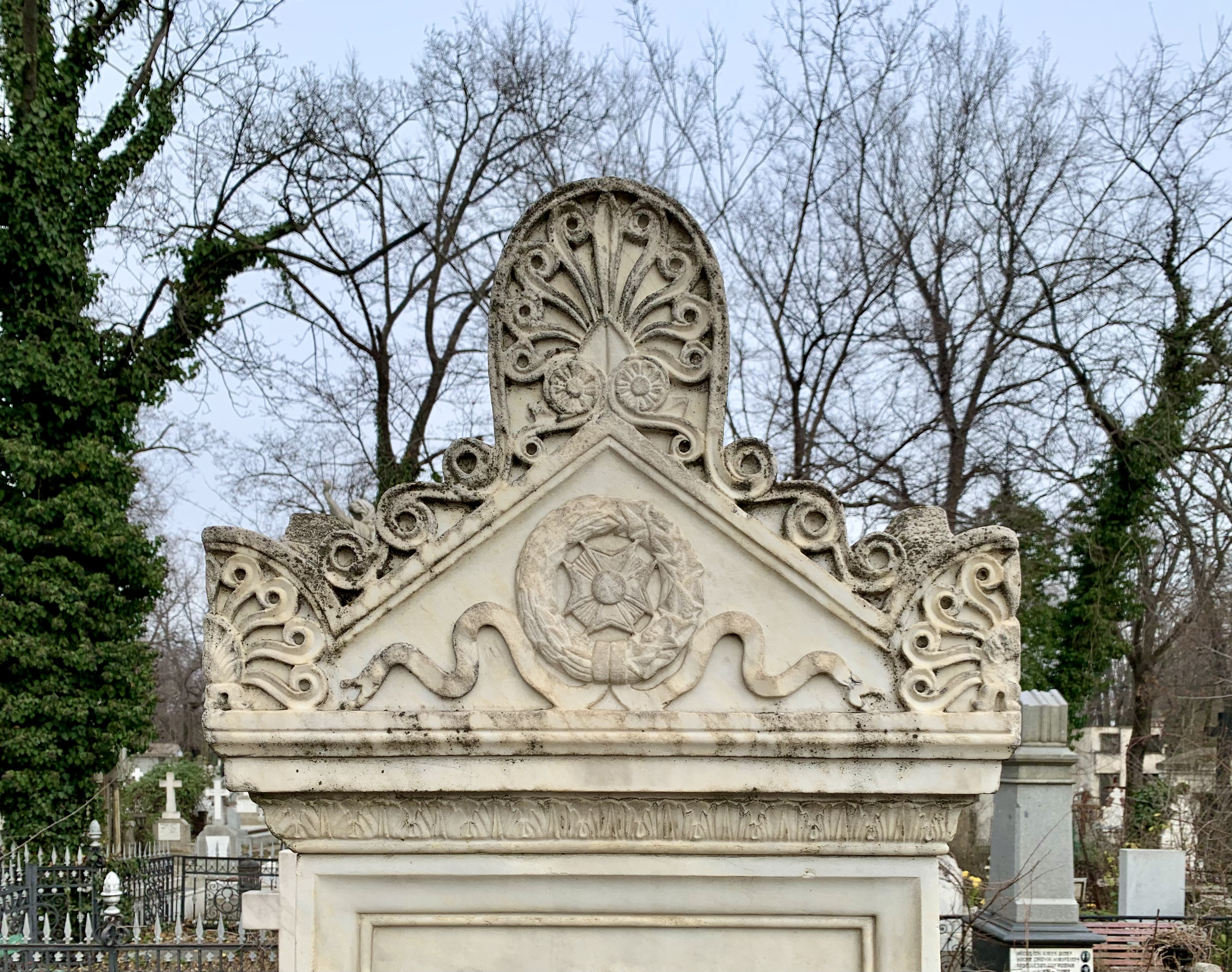
Neoclassical volutes of a pediment with acroteria of the Grave of Alexandrina Grejdanescu and Barbu Grejdanescu, Bellu Cemetery, Bucharest, Romania, unknown architect or sculptor, c.1871

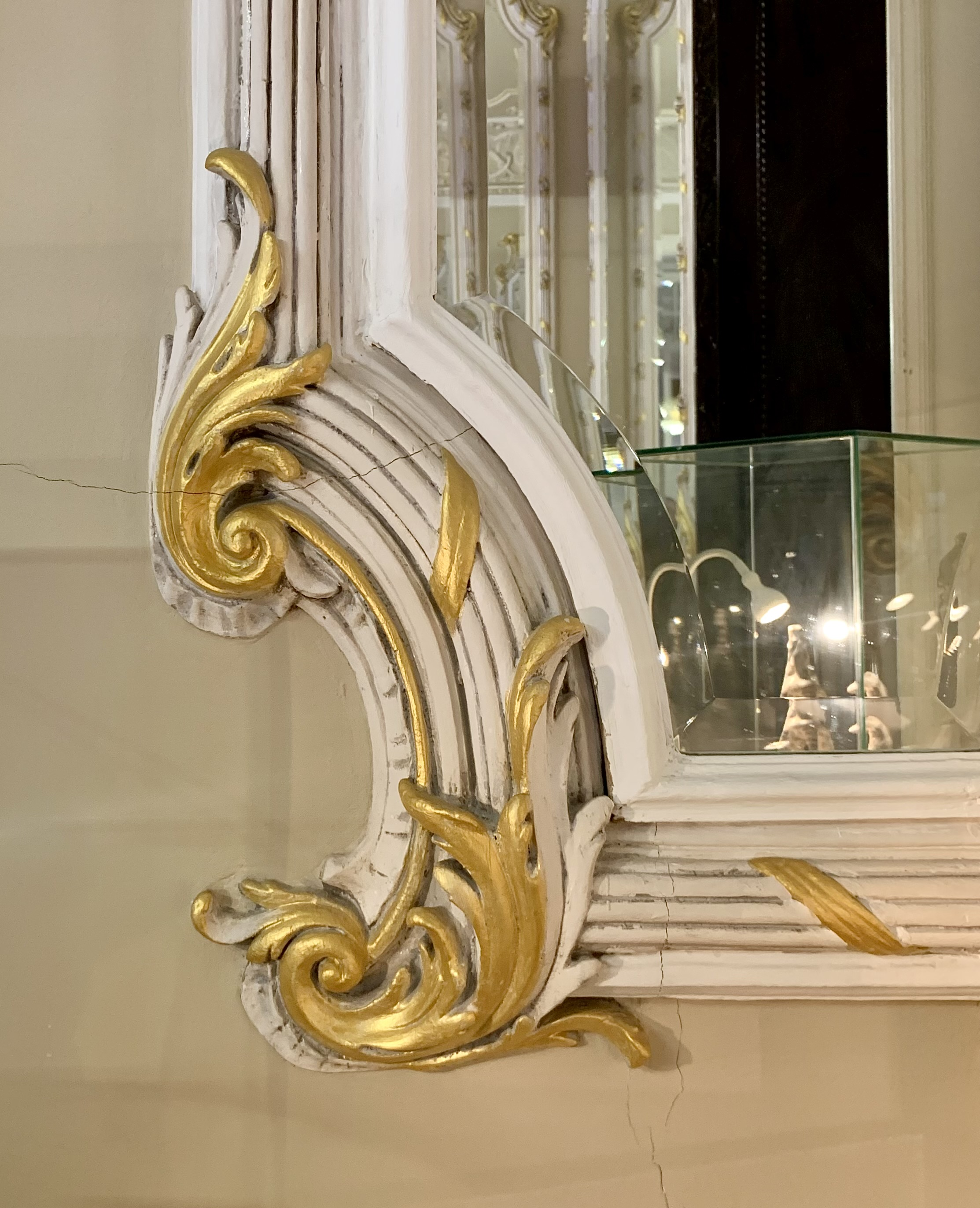
Rococo Revival volutes on a wall in the George Severeanu Museum, Bucharest, unknown architect, c.1900

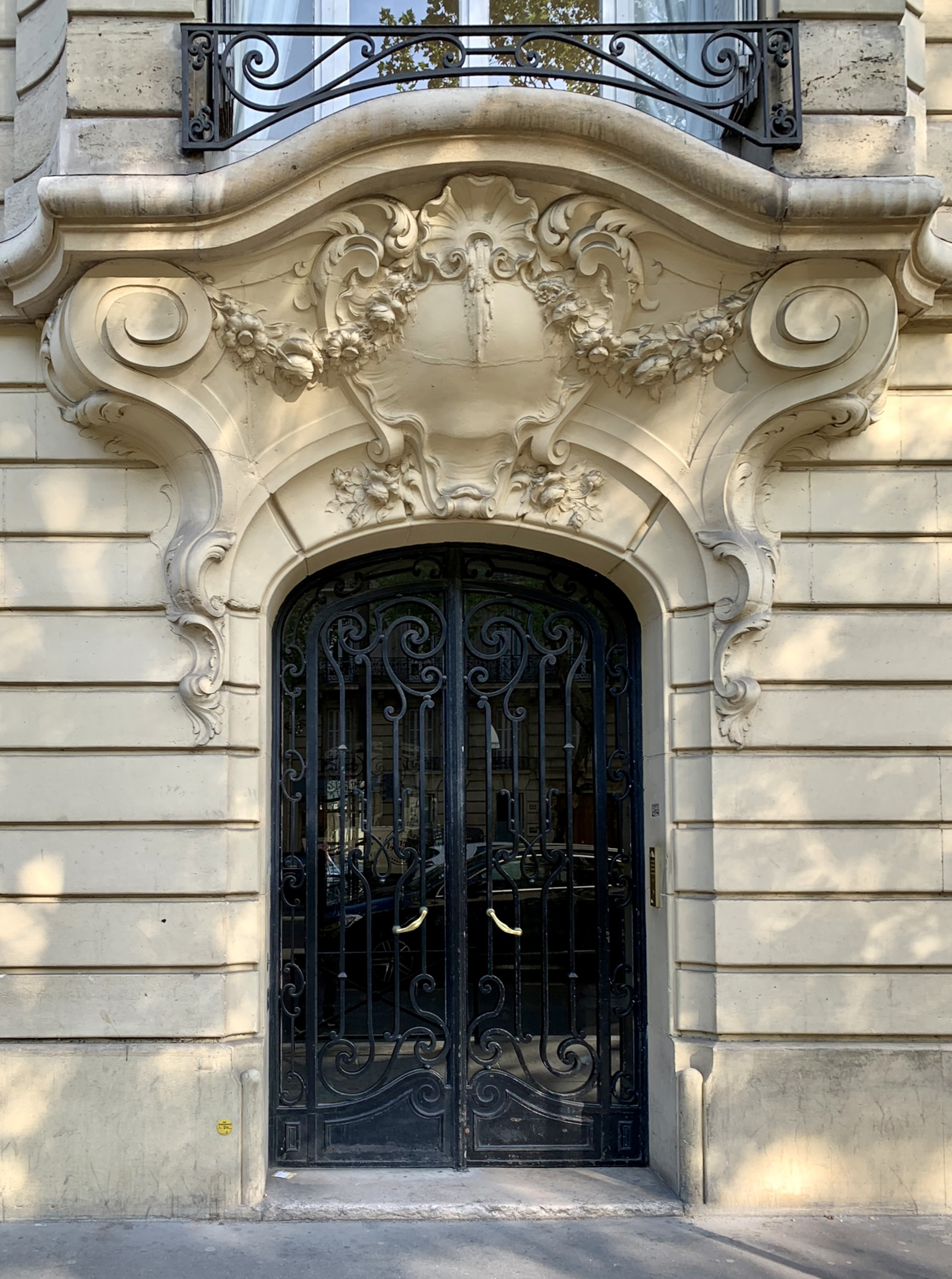
Rococo Revival volutes above the door of Avenue Kléber no. 47bis, Paris, unknown architect, 1908

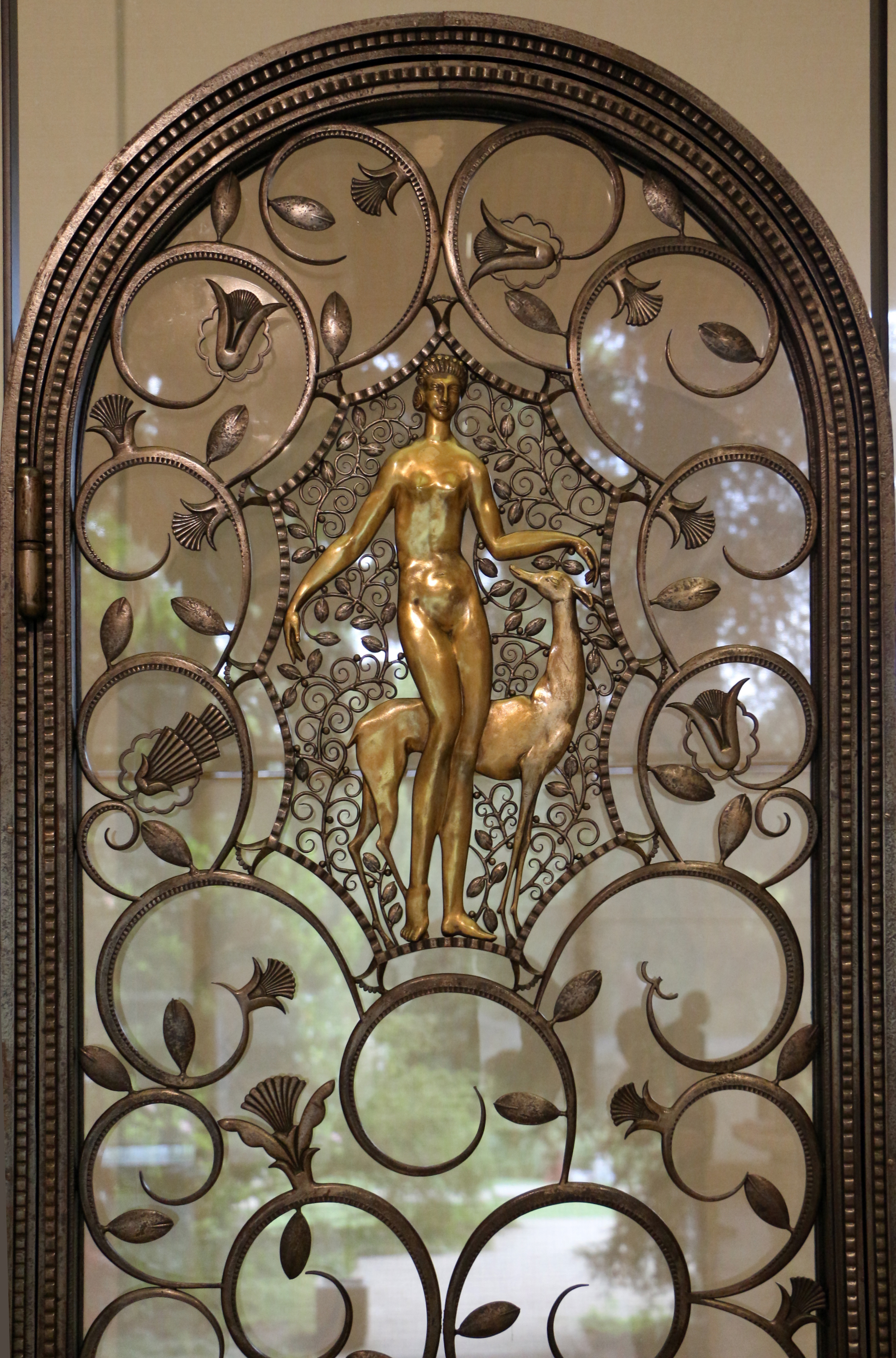
Art Deco volutes on a pair of elevator doors, by Edgar Brandt, 1926, wrought iron, glass, and patinated and gilded bronze, Calouste Gulbenkian Museum, Lisbon

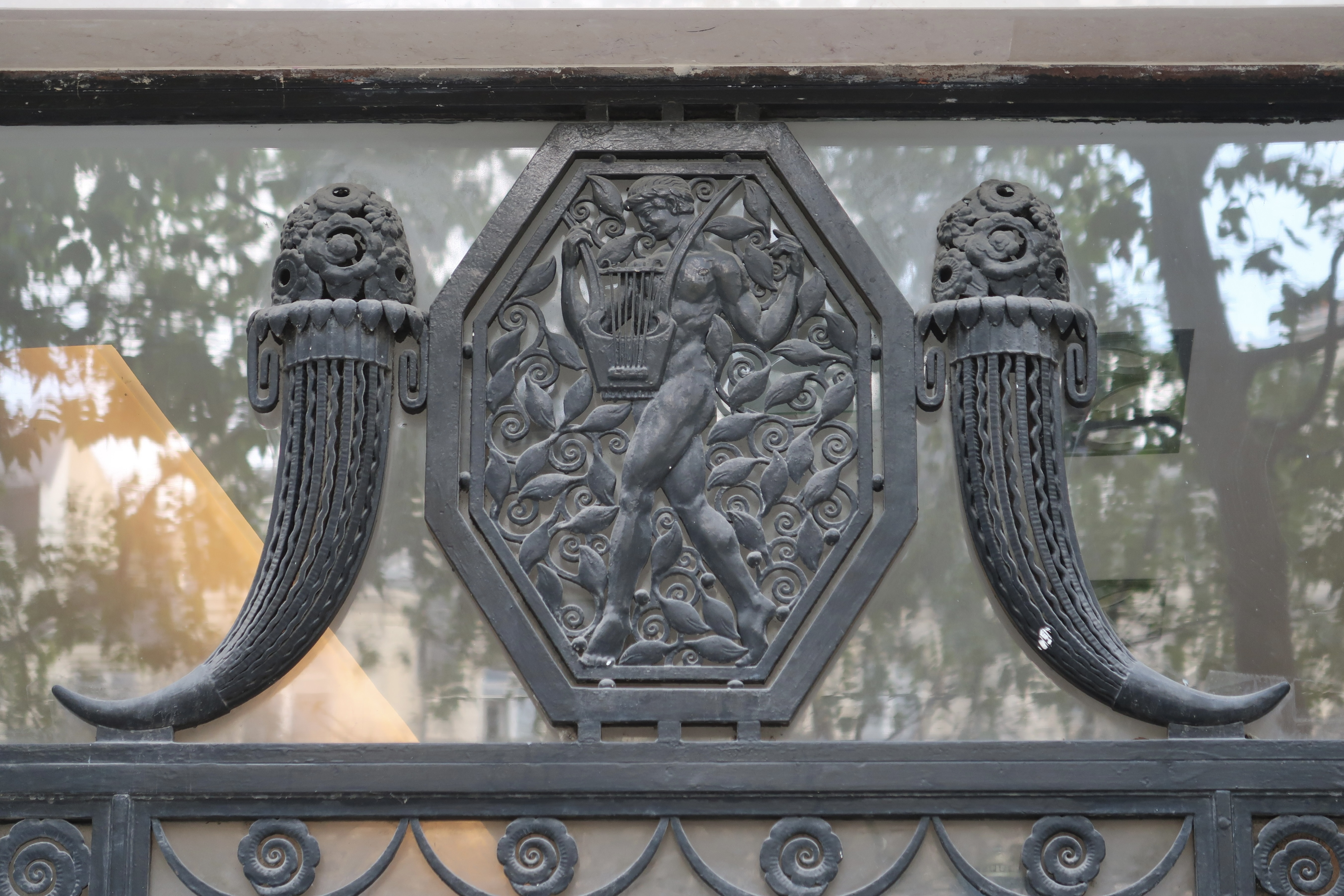
Art Deco volutes on some ironwork of Avenue des Champs-Élysées no. 77 in Paris, unknown architect, (c. 1930)

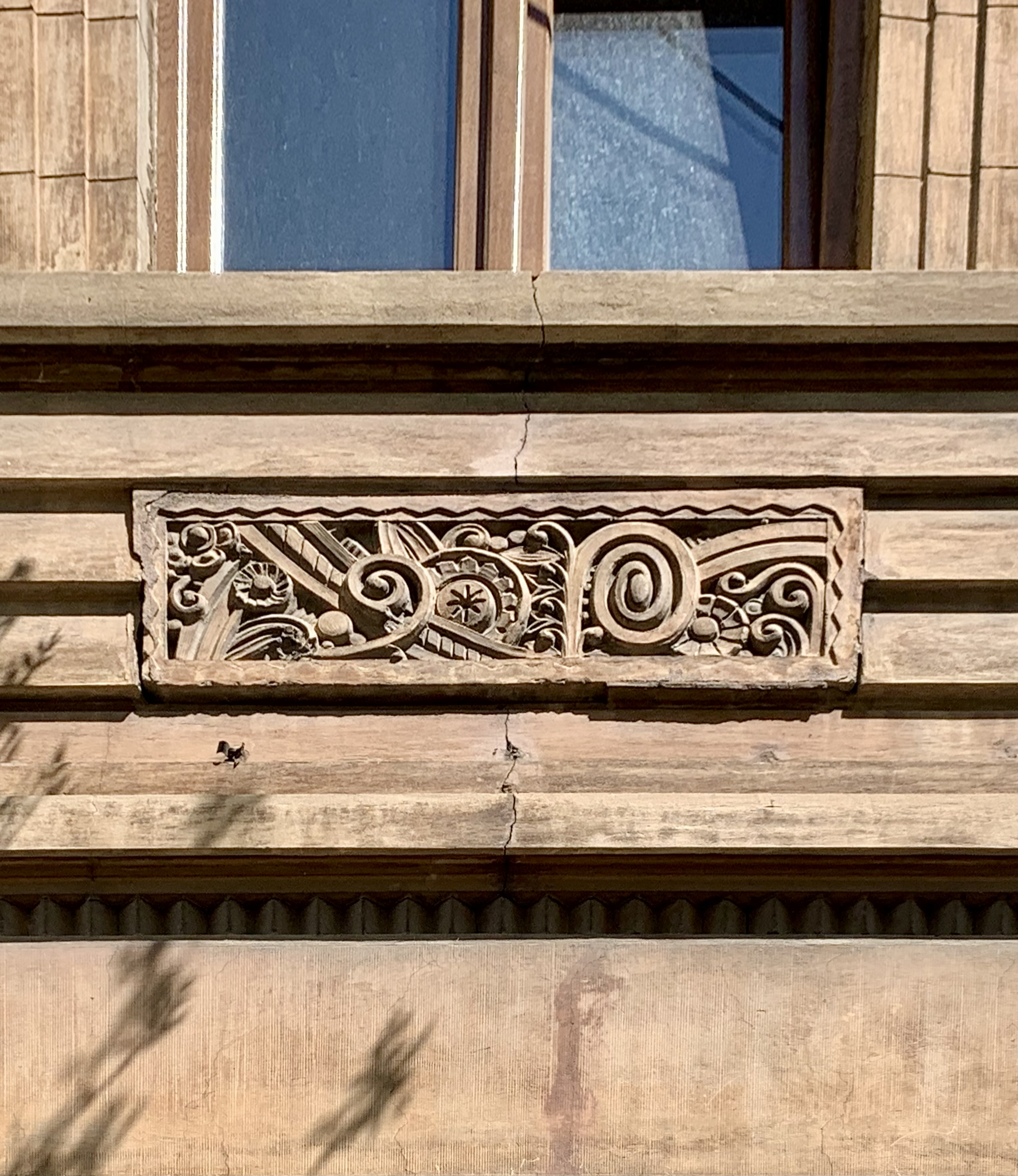
Art Deco volutes in a relief panel on Piața Mihail Kogălniceanu no. 1, Bucharest, unknown architect, c.1930

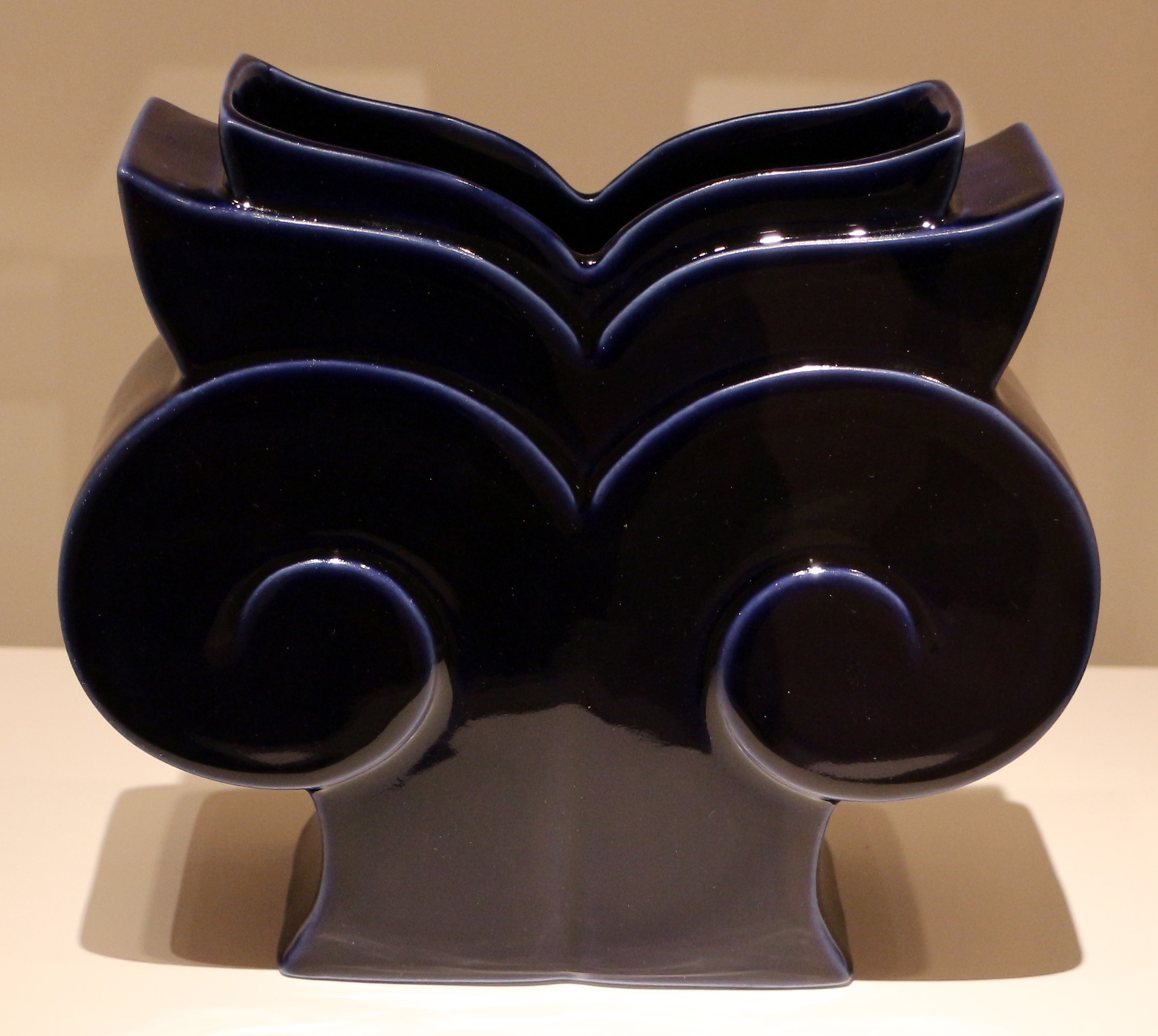
Postmodern volutes of a vase inspired by the Ionic capital, designed by Michael Graves for Swid Powell, 1989, glazed porcelain, Indianapolis Museum of Art, Indianapolis, US

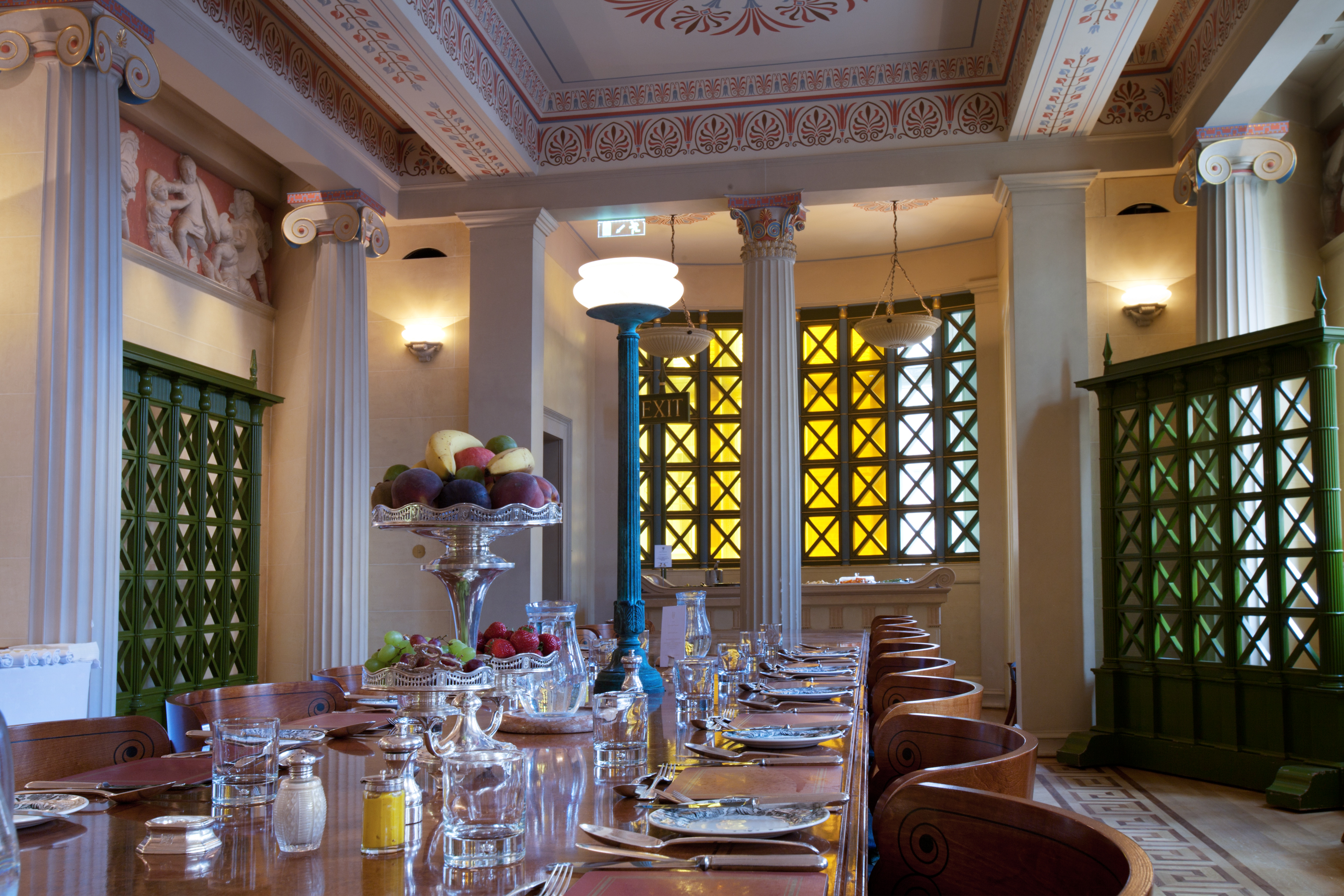
New Classical volutes of Ionic and Corinthian columns in the Gonville and Caius College Hall, Cambridge, UK, with capitals inspired by those from the Temple of Apollo at Bassae, by John Simpson, 1998

=== Use in stylization ===
Besides the use for decoration, volutes were also used for the rendering of detailed textures. Many cultures that produced stylized art used geometric patterns for the reproduction of highly detailed textures. The volutes were most often used for hair, an example of this being Ancient Mesopotamian art, where the strands of hair are shown through patterns of volutes.

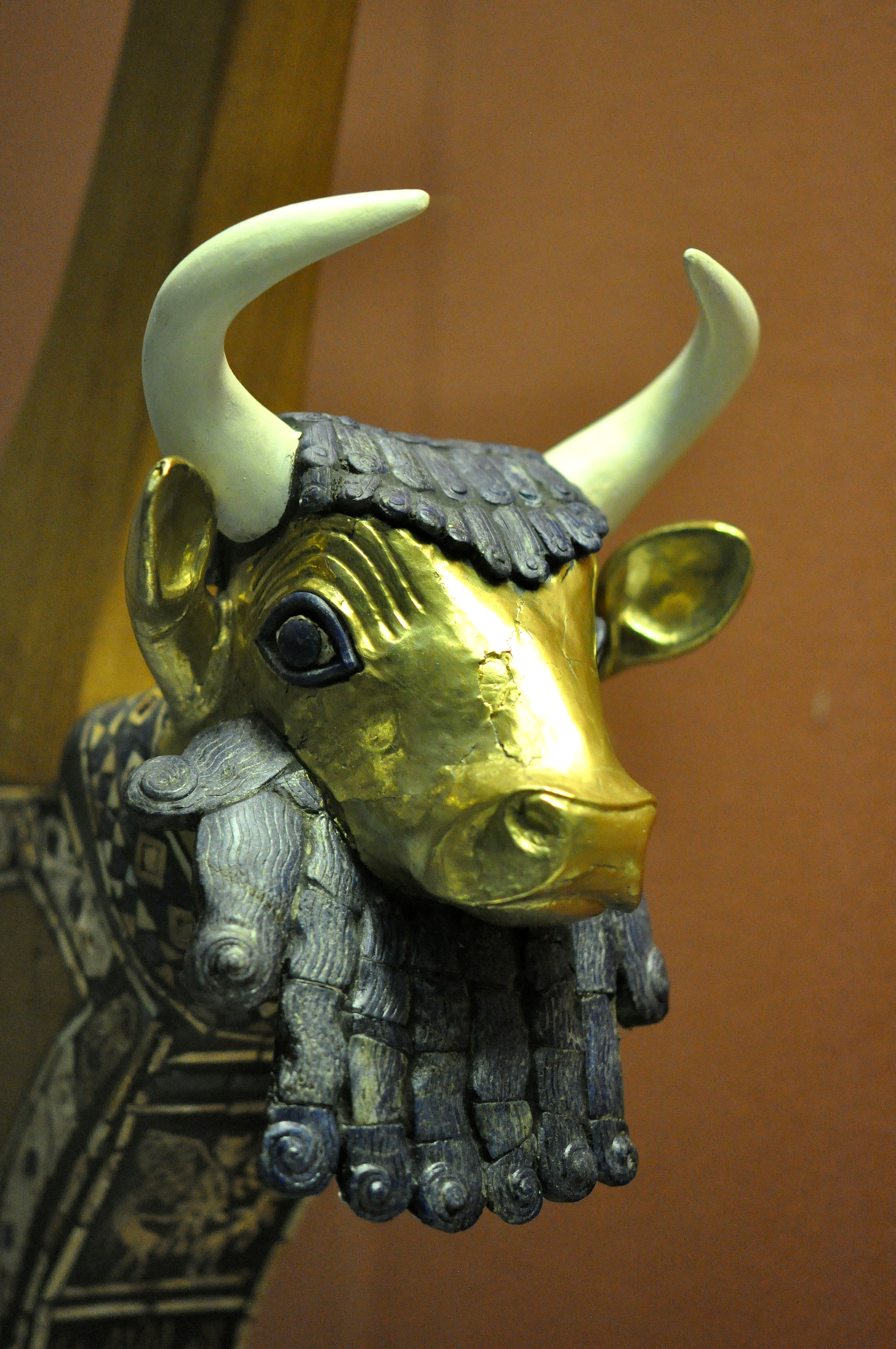
Sumerian volutes at the end of the strands of a bull mascaron of the queen's lyre, one of the Lyres of Ur, 2600 BC, wood, lapis lazuli, limestone (red), bitumen, gold, shell, British Museum

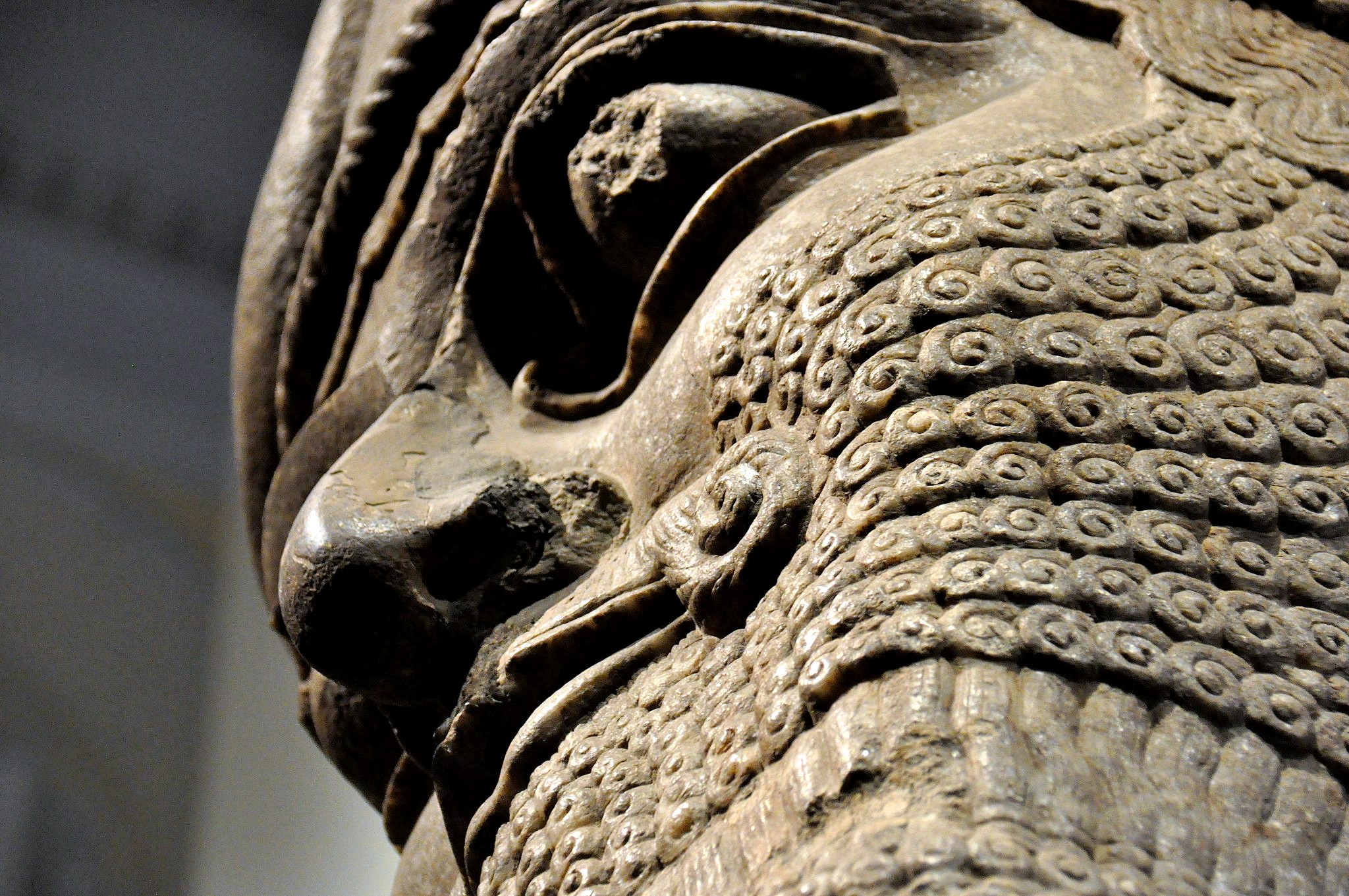
Neo-Assyrian lamassu, c.865-860 BC, gypsum, British Museum

== See also ==
- Scrollwork
- Ionic order
- Spiral
