= Chausath Yogini Temple (disambiguation) =

The Chausath Yogini temples in India include:

- Chausath Yogini Temple, Hirapur, Odisha
- Chausath Yogini Temple, Ranipur Jharial, Odisha
- Chausath Yogini Temple, Jabalpur, Madhya Pradesh
- Chausath Yogini temple, Khajuraho, Madhya Pradesh
- Chausath Yogini Temple, Morena, Madhya Pradesh
