= Chausath Yogini Temple, Ranipur Jharial =

Temple in Odisha, India

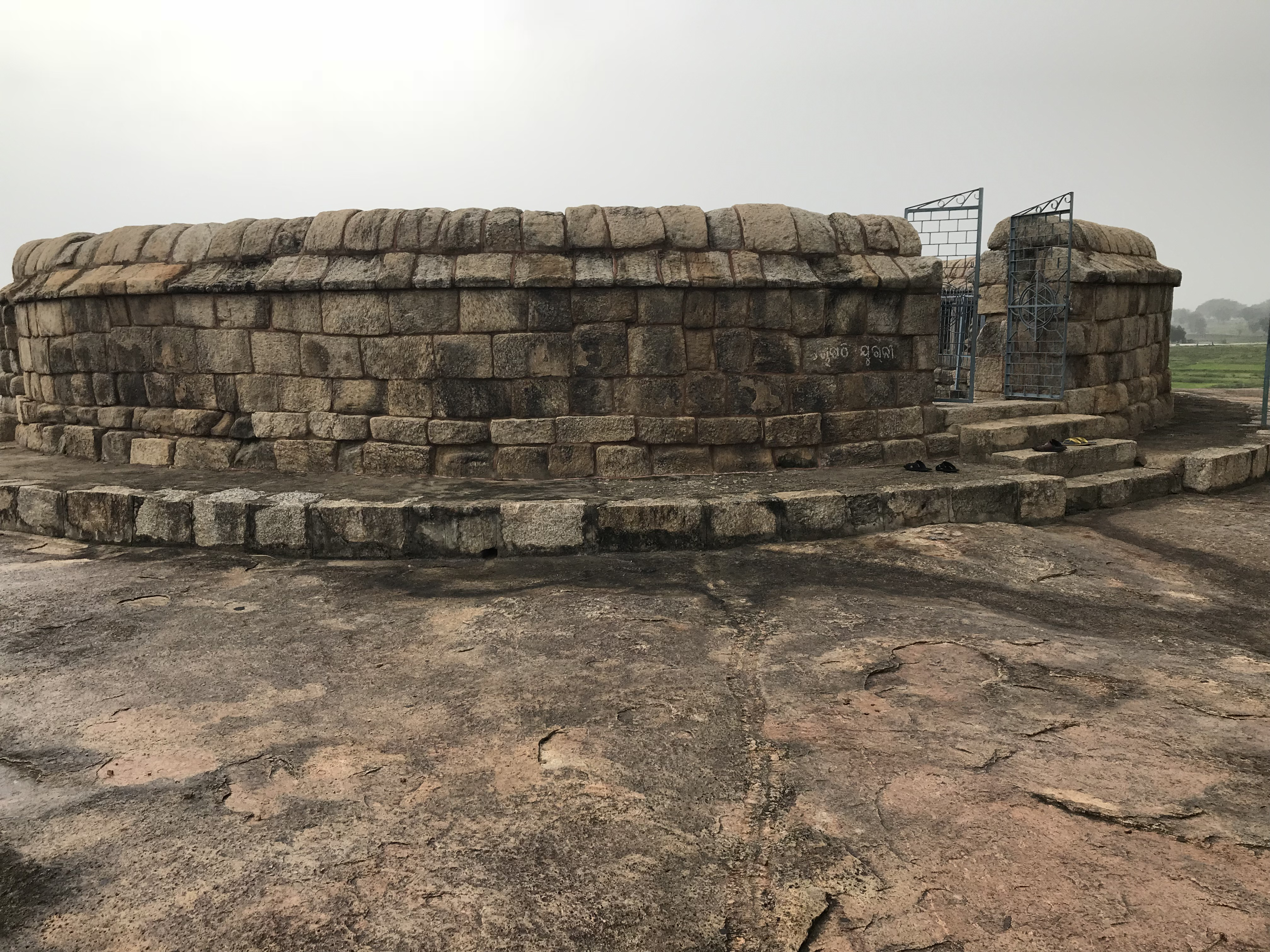
The exterior of the Ranipur-Jharial Yogini temple on its rocky outcrop

Chausath Yogini Temple of Ranipur Jharial in Balangir District, Odisha, is one of the circular, open air Yogini temples of India, dedicated to the 64 Yoginis. It appears to be an early temple from soon after 900 CE, and the presence of other temples indicates that it was an important site at that time. The surviving central shrine holds an image of dancing Shiva; all the Yogini images are, uniquely, similarly shown dancing.

== Temple ==
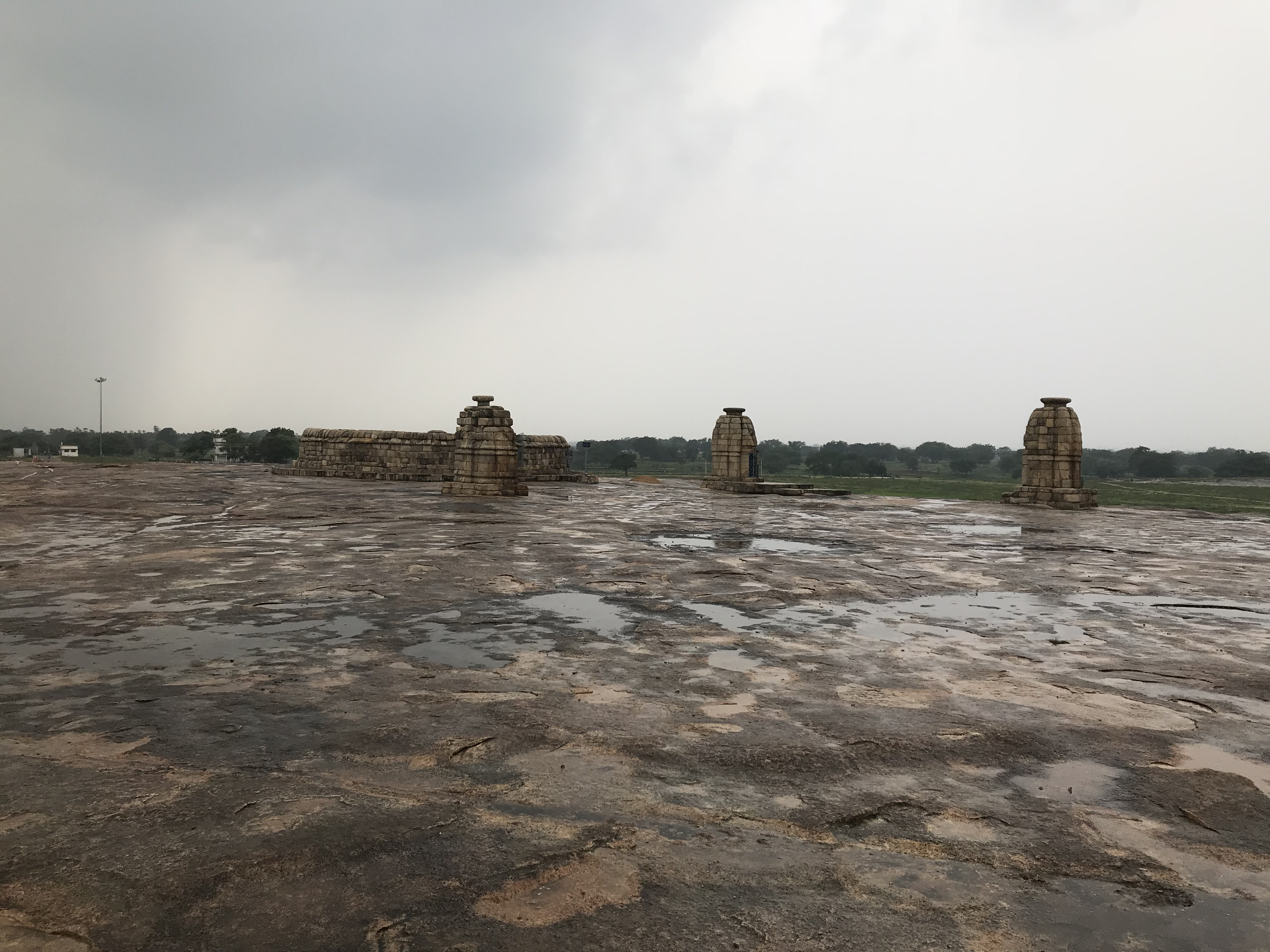
The site, with several small temples on the same rocky outcrop as the Yogini temple

The Chausath Yogini Temple, built in the 9th or 10th century in Ranipur-Jharial, in an isolated position some miles from the towns of Titilagarh and Kantabanjhi in Balangir district, Odisha, is a circular, hypaethral, 64-yogini temple made of sandstone, some 50 feet in diameter. 62 of the yogini images survive. The site, on an outcrop of rock, must have been important, given the presence of a large temple built of brick and several small temples of stone. The primary entrance is an opening in the circular wall towards the east; unlike at the Hirapur yogini temple, there was once a further opening towards the south, now filled in.

Ranipur-Jharial was the first of the Yogini temples to be discovered; it was described by Major-General John Campbell in 1853.

== Shrine to Shiva and Chamunda ==
At the centre of the temple is the original shrine with four pillars, holding an image of Nateshwar, Shiva as Lord of Dance. The Shiva image is three-faced and eight-armed, and is depicted with urdhva linga, an erection. Elephant-headed Ganesh and the bull Nandi are shown in the image's base. The similar-sized image of the goddess Chamunda in the temple may once have been housed with Shiva in the central shrine.

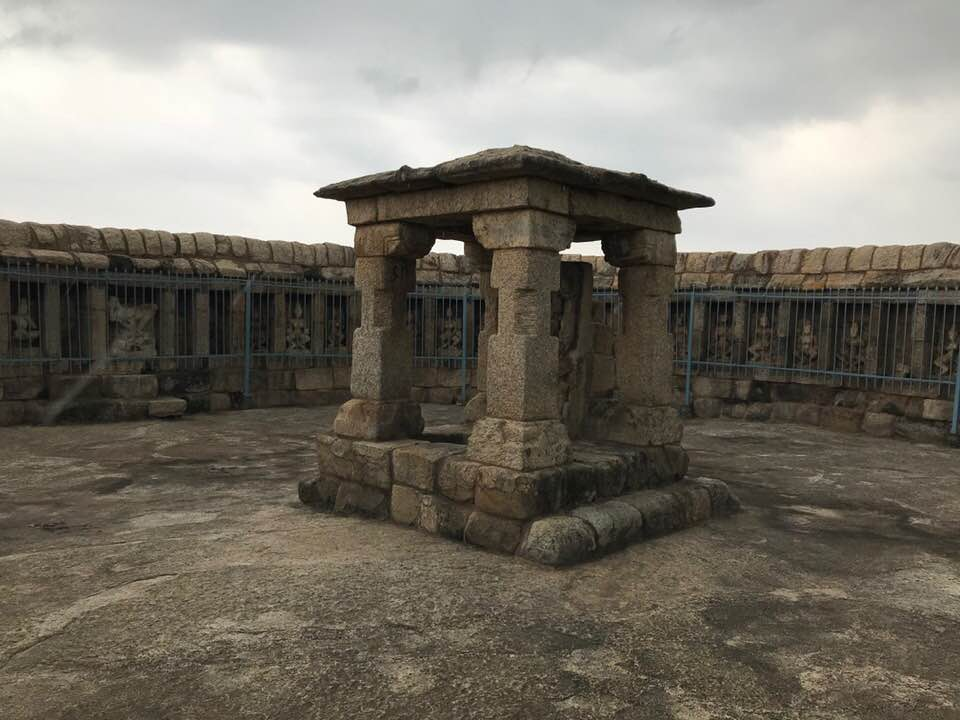
Simple 4-pillared central shrine

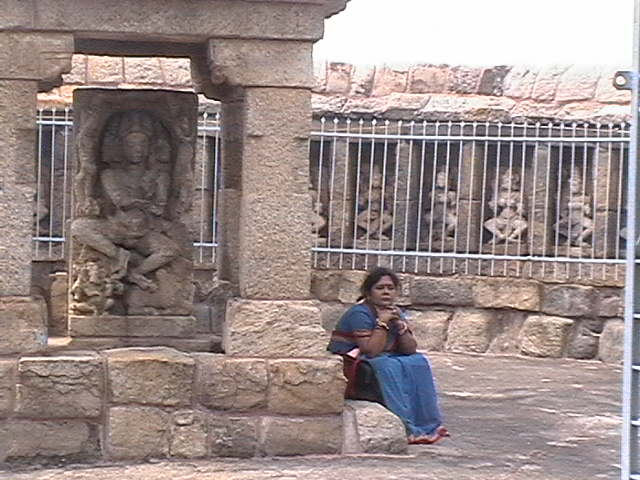
Statue of Nateshwar, Shiva as Lord of Dance, in central shrine

== Yogini images ==
The Ranipur Jharial Yoginis are made, like the temple walls, of a coarse sandstone, which was weathered; they were once finely carved. Uniquely, all the Yogini images are depicted poised about to dance, in the karana pose of Indian classical dance; Vidya Dehejia explains that the posture is taken up at the start of each group of movements. Like the Hirapur temple, but unlike other Yogini temples, there are no Matrikas, mother goddesses, among the Yoginis. 14 of the Yoginis are animal-headed; among them can be seen goddesses with the heads of a cat, an elephant, a snake, a horse, a buffalo, an antelope, and seemingly also of a leopard and a sow. The leopard-headed goddess is holding up a human corpse, suggestive of the corpse rituals (shava sadhana) of the Yogini cult. The absence of haloes or attendant figures as at later Yogini temples suggests that this temple was built relatively early.

The 19th century archaeologist Alexander Cunningham described two further Yogini images. One had the attributes of the Sun-god, Surya; she had two arms, a lotus flower in each hand, and seven horses. The other (now only from the knees down) was dancing on a reclining male; she had 6 or 8 arms, and was depicted pulling her mouth open wide; she held a skull-cup, a kettle-drum, and a sword.

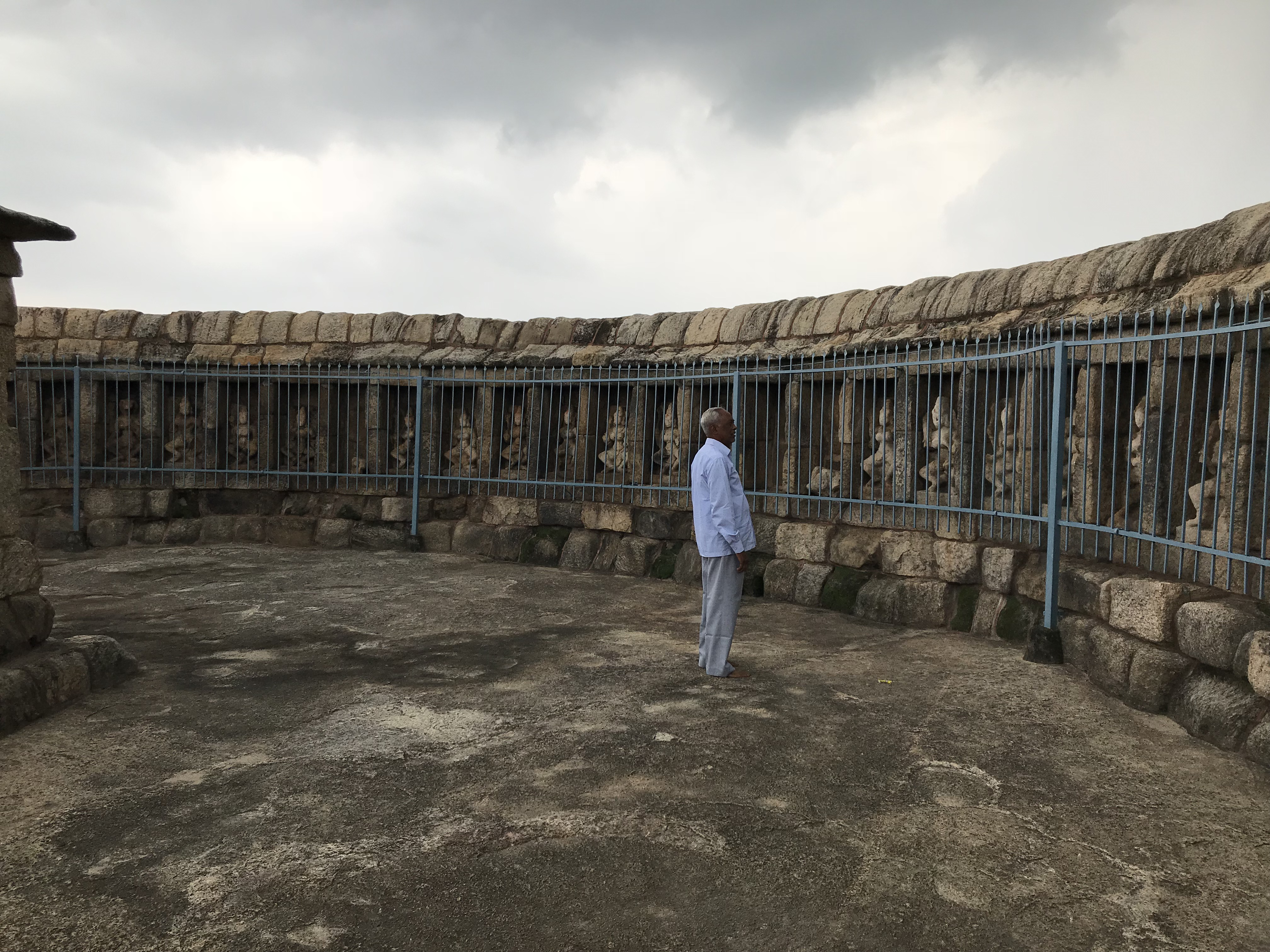
Yogini images in cells in the perimeter wall

== See also ==
- Chausath Yogini Temple, Hirapur
- Chausath Yogini Temple, Mitaoli
- Chausath Yogini Temple, Khajuraho
- Chausath Yogini Temple, Bhedaghat

== Sources ==
- Dehejia, Vidya (1986). Yogini Cult and Temples: A Tantric Tradition. National Museum, Janpath, New Delhi. pp. 103–114.
- Hatley, Shaman (2007). The Brahmayāmalatantra and Early Śaiva Cult of Yoginīs. University of Pennsylvania (PhD Thesis, UMI Number: 3292099). pp. 1–459. Archived from the original on July 23, 2010.
