= Chausath Yogini Temple, Mitaoli =

Temple in Morena, Madhya Pradesh, India

Chausath Yogini Temple
- Ekattarso Mahadeva
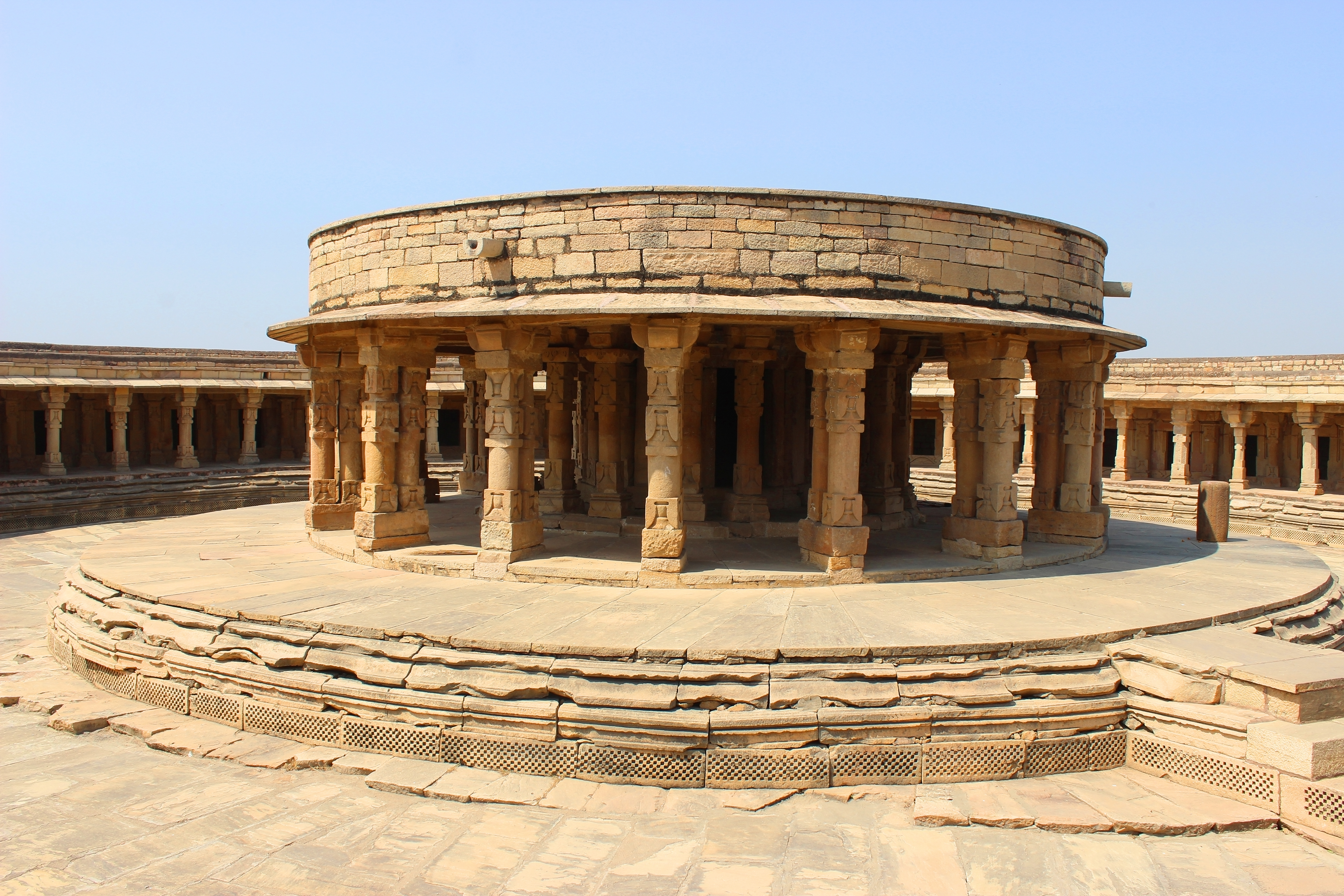
- Chausath Yogini Temple

- Location within Madhya Pradesh Location within India

Religion
- Affiliation: Hinduism

Location
- Location: Morena
- State: Madhya Pradesh
- Country: India
- Coordinates: 26°26′12″N 78°14′07″E

The Chausath Yogini Temple, Mitaoli, also known as Ekattarso Mahadeva Temple, is an 11th-century temple in Morena district in the Indian state of Madhya Pradesh. Build during Kachchhapaghata reign, it is one of the well-preserved Yogini temples in India. The temple is formed by a circular wall with 65 chambers, apparently for 64 yoginis and the goddess Devi, and an open mandapa in the centre of a circular courtyard, sacred to Shiva.

== Context: Yogini temples ==
Infographic on significance of Yogini temples, showing design for communion with yoginis, thought to be capable of flight

The Yogini shrines are usually circular enclosures, and they are hypaethral, open to the sky, unlike most Indian temples. This is because they were designed for communion with yoginis, thought to be capable of flight. Inside the circular wall are niches, most often 64, containing statues of female figures, the yoginis. Their bodies are described as beautiful, but their heads are often those of animals. Yogini temples normally stood somewhat outside the main group of temples, and at the highest point of the site.

== History ==
The Chausath Yogini temple is in Mitaoli village, (Note: Also spelled Mitauli, Mitawali or Mitavali.) Morena district, Madhya Pradesh. According to an inscription dated to 1323 CE (Vikram Samvat 1383), the temple was built by the Kachchhapaghata king Devapala (r. c. 1055 – 1075). It is said that the temple was the venue of providing education in astrology and mathematics based on the transit of the Sun.

The Archaeological Survey of India has declared the temple an ancient and historical monument under Act No. LXXI of 1951, dt.28/11/1951.

== Features ==
The temple is on a hill about 100 feet (30 m) in height; there are 100 steps to climb up to the entrance. It is circular with a radius of 170 feet (52 m), while inside it has 65 small chambers, each with a mandapa which is open and a facia of pilasters and pillars. The roof of the ring of shrines is flat, as is that of the central shrine to Shiva; the circular courtyard is hypaethral, open to the sky, with an open porch as its entrance. The parliament building of India is said to have been based on this temple.

The exterior surface of the outer wall, unlike other Yogini temples which are quite plain outside, was decorated with statues of couples flanked by maidens, mostly now lost or badly damaged.

Each of the chambers around the inside of the perimeter wall now contains an image of Shiva. However, originally these contained 64 Yogini images and probably one image of the great goddess Devi. The temple is therefore known as Chausath Yogini Temple (Chausath being the Hindi for "Sixty four"). It is said that the roofs over the 64 chambers and the central shrine had towers or shikharas, as those at the Chausath Yogini Temple, Khajuraho still do, but that these were removed during later modifications. The central shrine's roofing slabs are perforated to allow rainwater to drain through pipes to a large underground tank.

The temple is in the Seismic Zone III region and has survived several earthquakes, seemingly without any serious damage. This fact was cited when the issue of safety from earthquake effect of the circular Parliament House, its design supposedly based on the Mitaoli temple, was debated in the Indian Parliament.

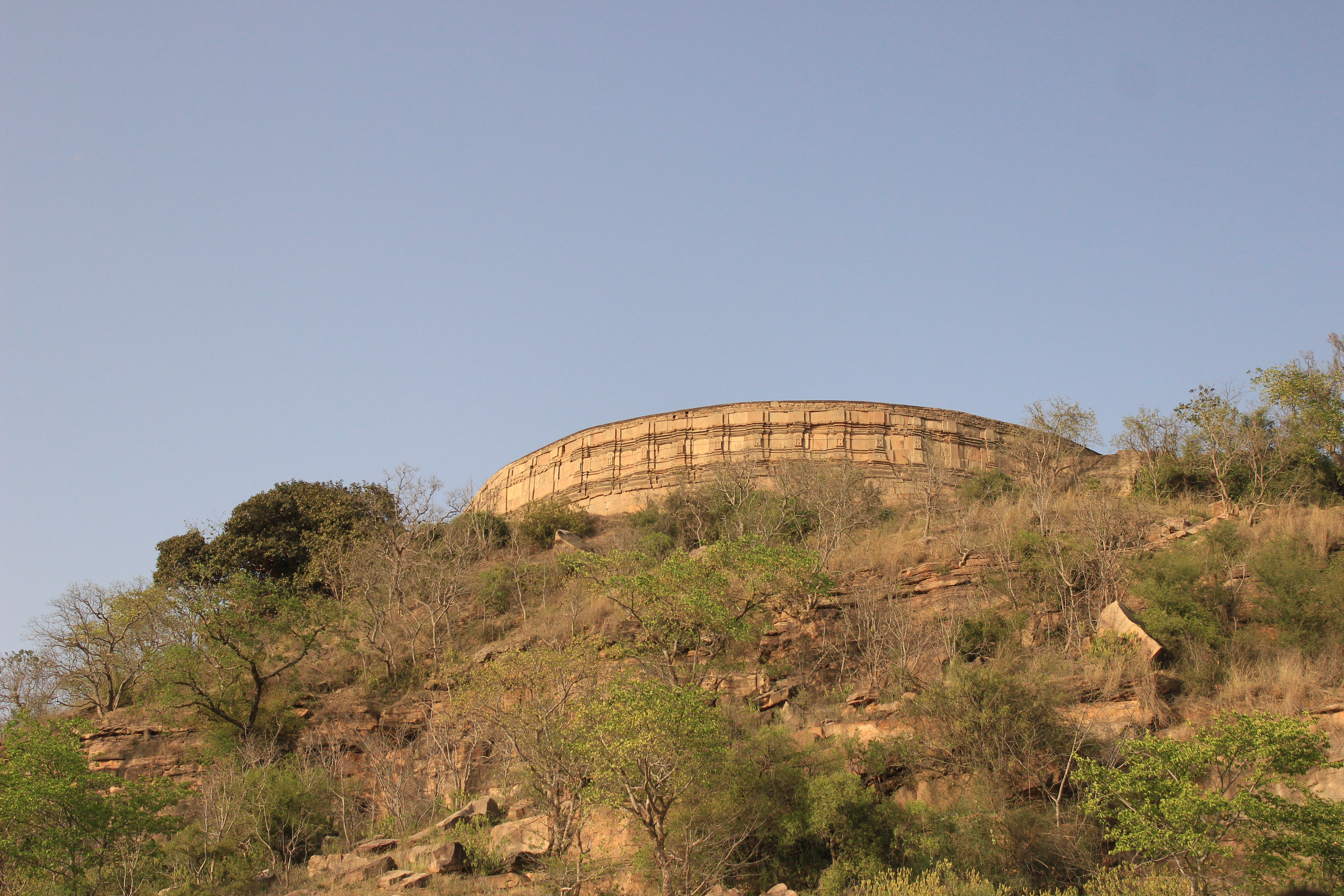
Chausath Yogini Temple on hilltop

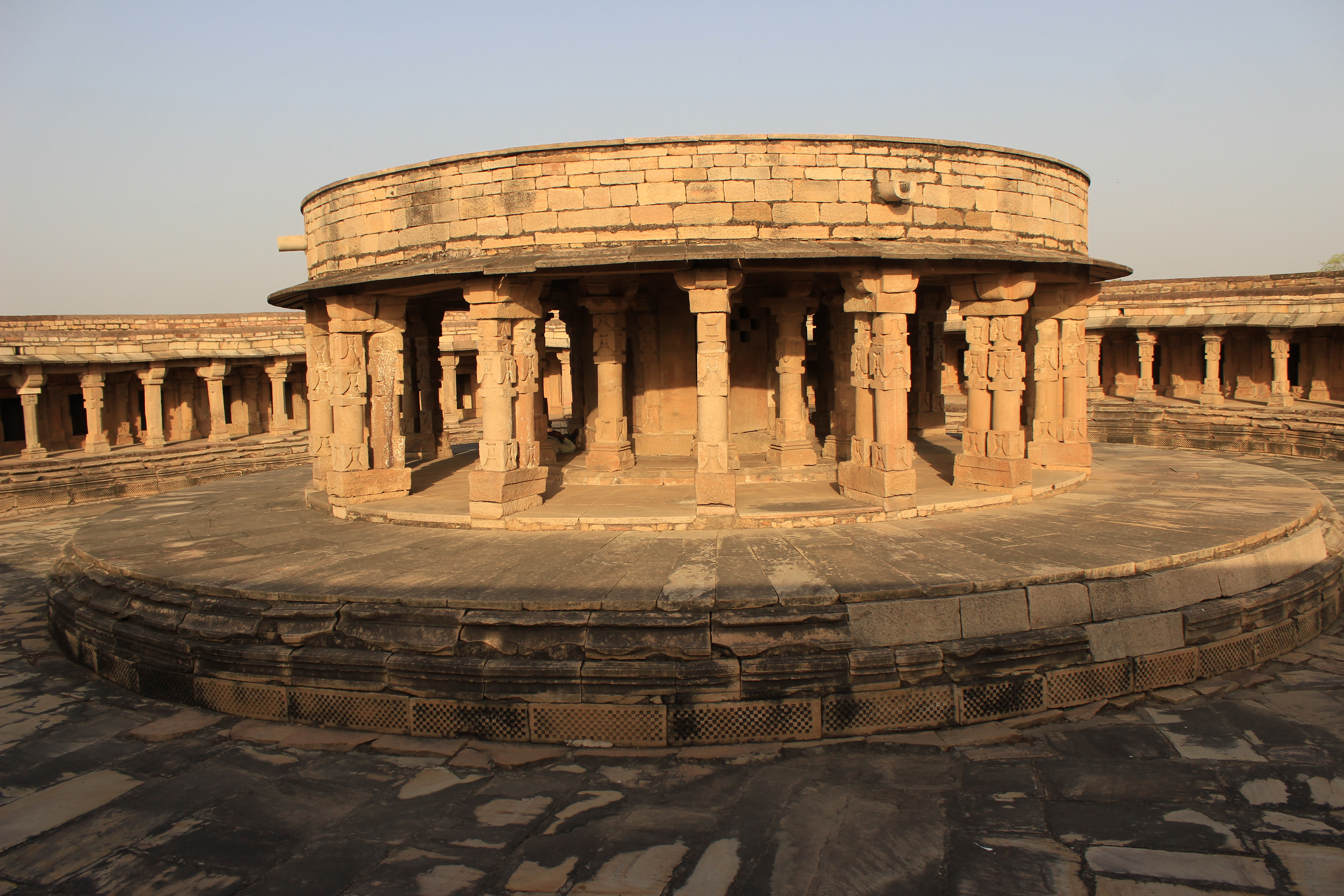
Central shrine

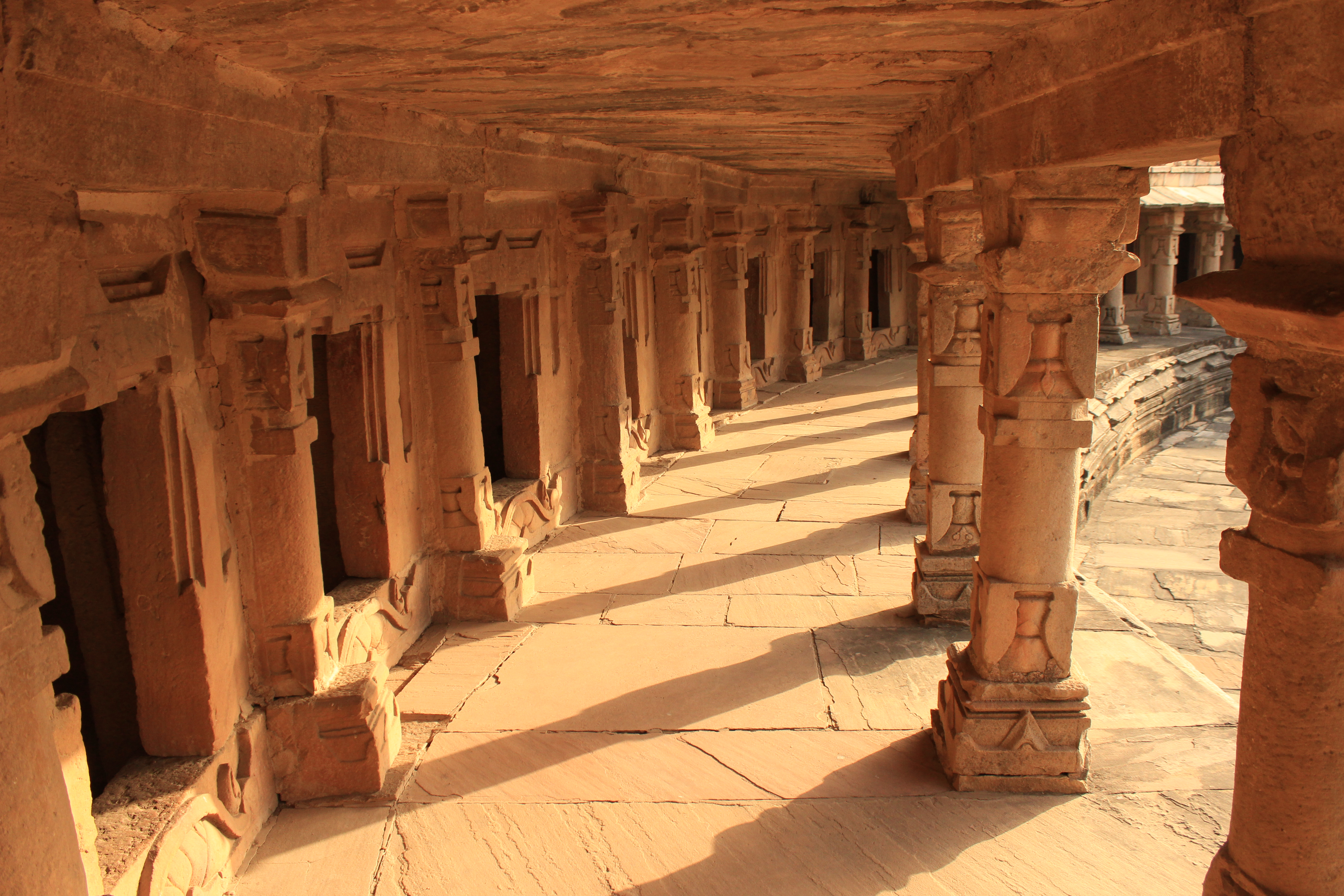
Circular walkway with shrines that once held Yogini images, now filled with Shiva Linga images

== See also ==
- Chausath Yogini Temple, Bhedaghat
- Chausath Yogini Temple, Ranipur Jharial
- Chausath Yogini Temple, Hirapur
- Chausath Yogini Temple, Khajuraho

== Bibliography ==
- Dehejia, Vidya (1986). Yogini Cult and Temples: A Tantric Tradition. National Museum, Janpath, New Delhi.
- Hatley, Shaman (2007). The Brahmayāmalatantra and Early Śaiva Cult of Yoginīs. University of Pennsylvania (PhD Thesis, UMI Number: 3292099). Archived from the original on 23 July 2010.
- Museums, Directorate of Archaeology & (2001). Puratan, Volume 12. Department of Archaeology and Museums, Madhya Pradesh.
