= Chausath Yogini Temple, Khajuraho =

Hindu temple in Madhya Pradesh, India

Chausath Yogini temple
- Chausath Yogini Mandir
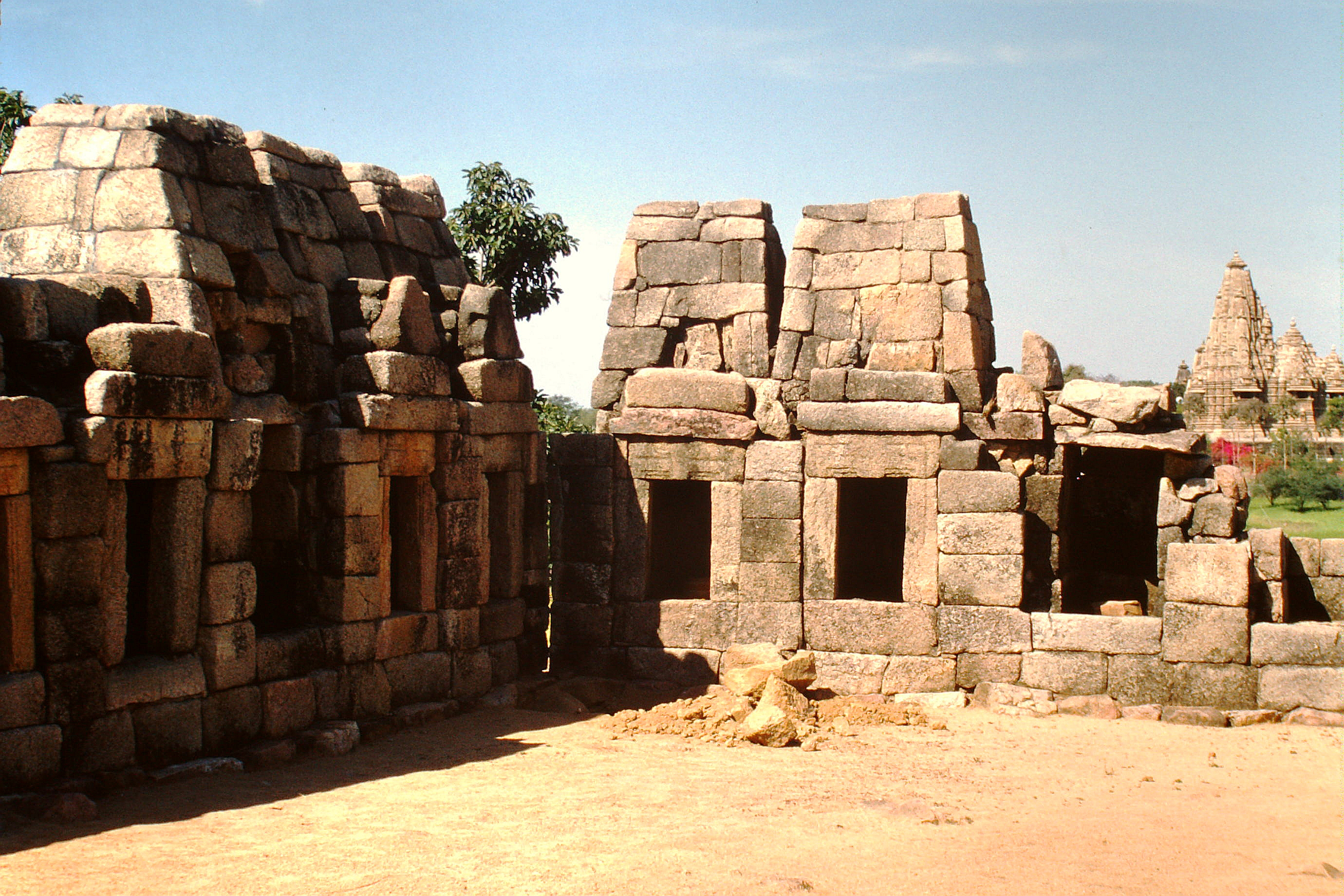

- Location in Madhya Pradesh, India Chausath Yogini Temple, Khajuraho (India)

Religion
- Affiliation: Hinduism (Tantra tradition)
- District: Chhatarpur
- Deity: Devi

Location
- Location: Khajuraho
- State: Madhya Pradesh
- Country: India
- Coordinates: 24.8495199°N 79.9181333°E

Architecture
- Established: 9th century CE

The Chausath Yogini temple is a ruined Yogini temple in the Khajuraho town of Madhya Pradesh, India. Dated to the late 9th century, it is the oldest surviving temple at Khajuraho. Unlike the Yogini temples at other places, it has a rectangular plan, but like them it is hypaethral, open to the air. As part of the Khajuraho Group of Monuments, and because of its unique Chandela architecture, the temple was inscribed on the UNESCO World Heritage List in 1986.

== History ==
The construction of the Khajuraho Yogini temple can be dated to approximately 885 CE. It is the earliest extant temple at the Chandela capital, Khajuraho. The temple has been classified as a Monument of National Importance by the Archaeological Survey of India.

Ruins of Yogini temples have been found at other places in and around the territory formerly ruled by the Chandelas or their feudatories, including Badoh, Bhedaghat Dudahi, Lokhari, Hinglajgarh, Mitaoli, Nareshwar, and Rikhiyan. This suggests that the cult of the Yoginis was well-established in the Chandela territory. The Chausath Yogini temples are connected to the Kapalika and Kaula sects.

== Architecture ==
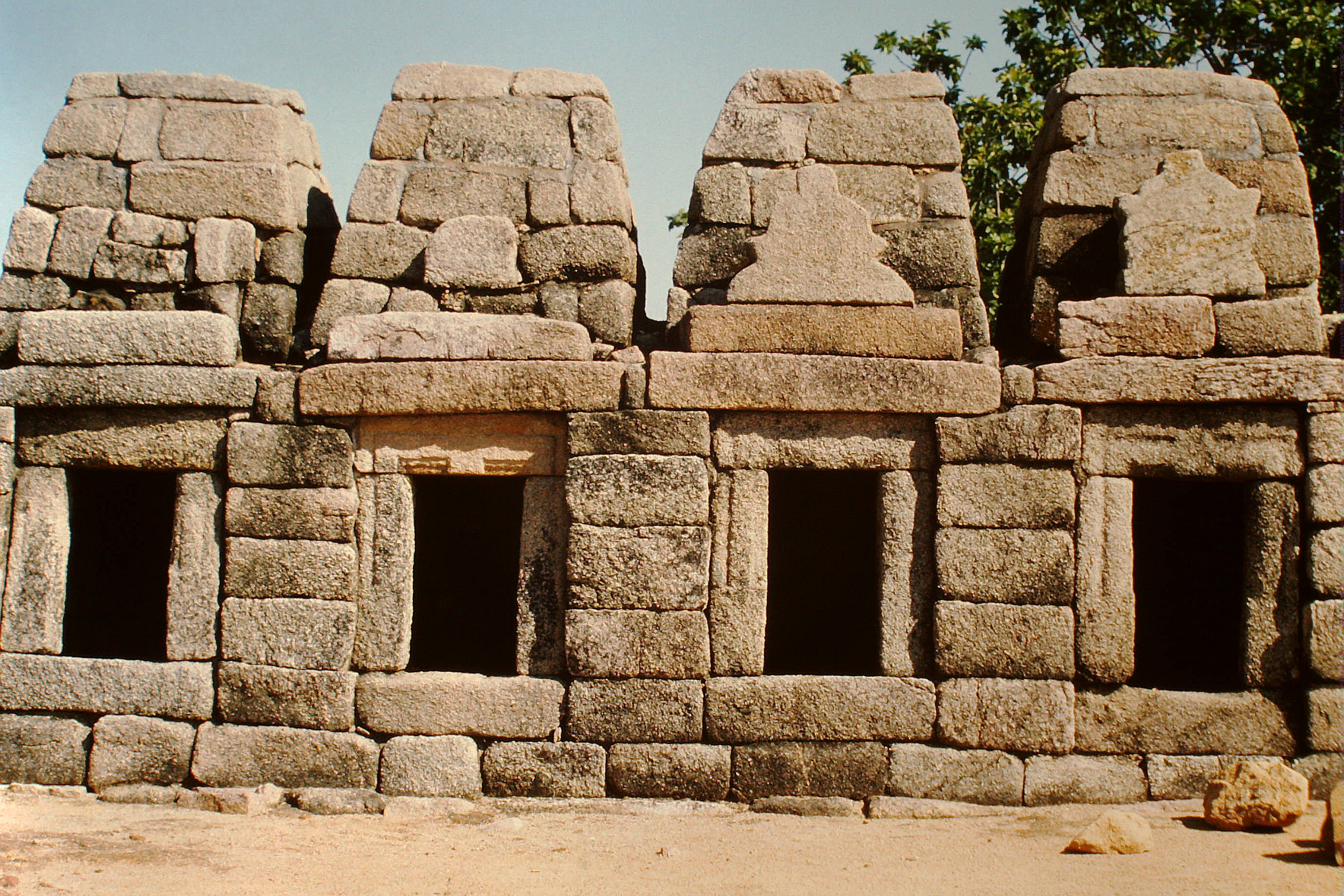
Shrine cells

Yogini temple plan, showing the 64 small shrines around a rectangular courtyard, and one larger shrine at the centre of the wall opposite the entrance

The temple is among the Western group of temples on a 5.4 m high platform. It has a rectangular plan measuring 31.4 m x 18.3 m. It is one of the historic Yogini temples across India; many of the others have a circular plan, though those at Rikhiyan and Badoh are also rectangular, so there was at least a local tradition of building them in this shape. Like all Yogini temples, the Khajuraho temple is hypaethral, open to the air.

The temple is made of large, coarse granite blocks, with an open courtyard at the centre. The courtyard was originally surrounded by 65 shrine cells: 10 on the front (north) wall, 11 on the back wall, and 22 on each side. Only 35 of these 65 cells now survive; each has a small doorway made of two squared granite pillars and a lintel stone, and a curvilinear tower roof. Above the lintel of the best-surviving cells is a triangular pediment. There is no surviving trace of a central shrine, whether to Shiva or the Goddess, as found in other Yogini temples.

Apart from a single much larger cell for the deity, each of the 64 cells for yoginis is approximately 1 m high and 1 m deep. The large cell is located at the centre of the back wall, and faces the entrance at the north. It was probably a shrine of Durga. The other 64 ("Chausath") cells presumably housed the statues of yoginis.

== Sculpture ==
No sculptures remain among the temple ruins. Three large statues of mother goddesses or Matrikas, found among the ruins, are now in the Khajuraho museum. The goddesses have been identified as Brahmani, Maheshvari, and Hingalaja or Mahishamardini. The image of Brahmani has three faces; her vehicle is a hamsa (swan or goose). Maheshvari is depicted with a trident and a humped bull. The image of Mahishamardini has one foot on a buffalo that she has defeated; she is holding its legs, and in two of her eight arms she wields a sword and shield. These statues are among the oldest sculptures of Khajuraho.

== See also ==
- Chausath Yogini Temple, Bhedaghat
- Chausath Yogini Temple, Ranipur Jharial
- Chausath Yogini Temple, Mitaoli
- Chausath Yogini Temple, Hirapur
