= Yogini temples =

9th- to 12th-century roofless hypaethral Hindu shrines

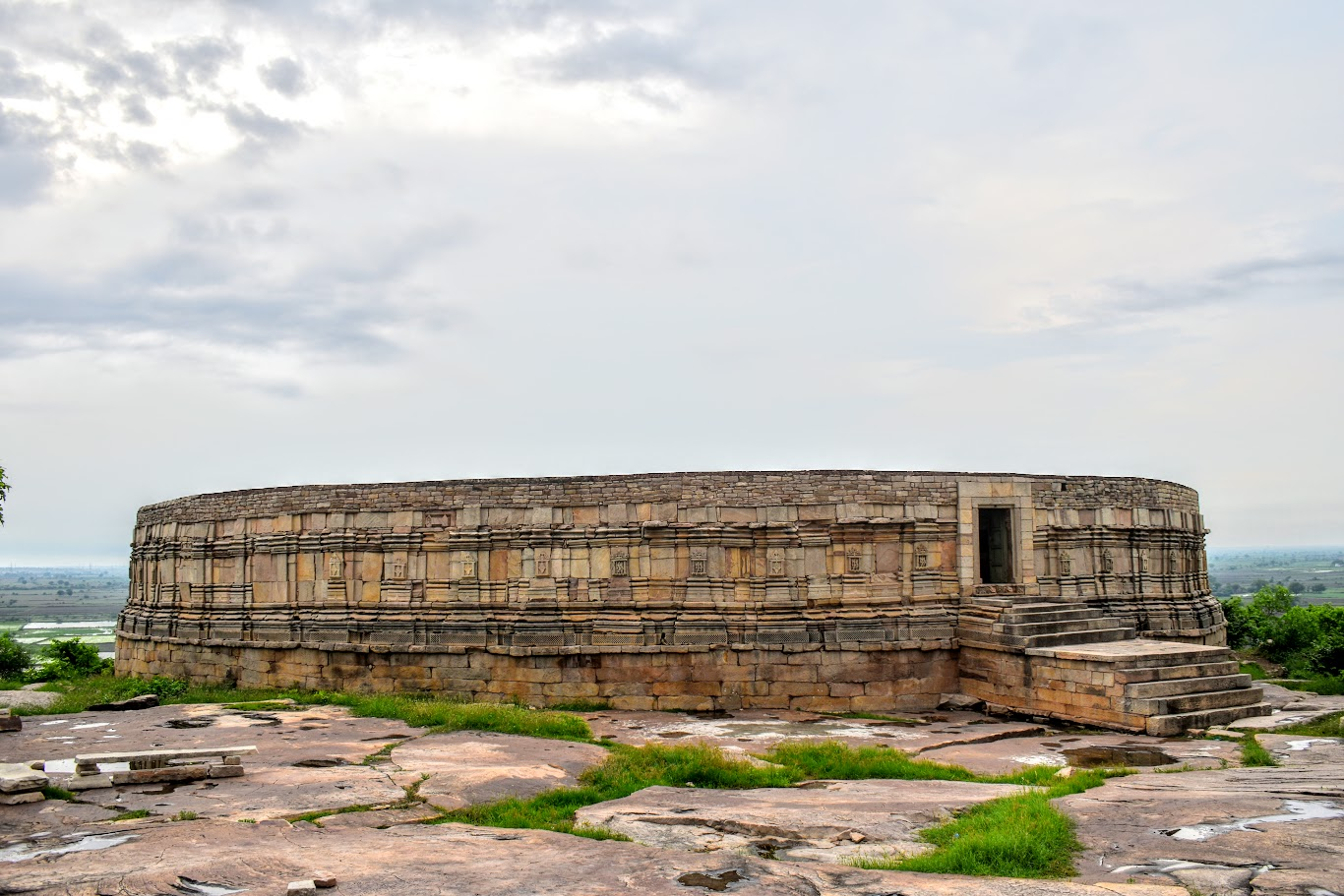
The Yogini temple at Mitaoli, on a rocky hilltop, open to the sky

Map of Yogini Temples in India

The Yogini temples of India are 9th- to 12th-century roofless hypaethral shrines to the yoginis, female masters of yoga in Hindu tantra, broadly equated with goddesses especially Parvati, incarnating the sacred feminine force. They remained largely unknown and unstudied by scholars until late in the 20th century. Several of the shrines have niches for 64 yoginis, so are called Chausath Yogini Temples (Chausath Yogini Mandir, from चौसठ, Hindi for 64, also written Chaunsath or Chausathi); others have 42 or 81 niches, implying different sets of goddesses, though they too are often called Chausath yogini temples. Even when there are 64 yoginis, these are not always the same.

The extant temples are either circular or rectangular in plan; they are scattered over central and northern India in the states of Uttar Pradesh, Madhya Pradesh, and Odisha. Lost temples, their locations identified from surviving yogini images, are still more widely distributed across the subcontinent, from Delhi in the north and the border of Rajasthan in the west to Greater Bengal in the east and Tamil Nadu in the south.

== Overview ==
=== Yoginis ===
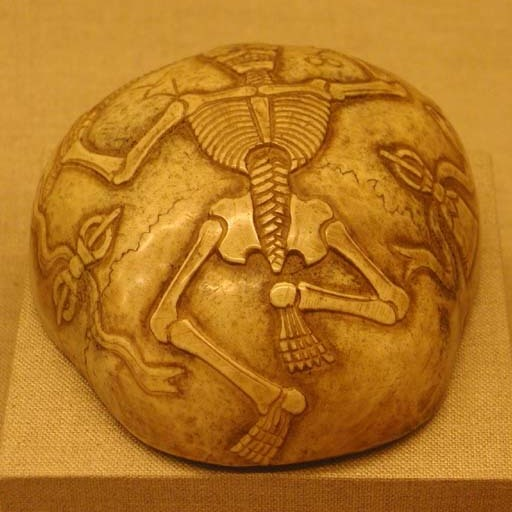
A kapala, a cup carved from a human skull, used in tantra, including by yoginis

From around the 10th century, Yoginis appear in groups, often of 64. They appear as goddesses, but human female adepts of tantra can emulate "and even embody" these deities, who can appear as mortal women, creating an ambiguous and blurred boundary between the human and the divine. Yoginis, divine or human, belong to clans; in Shaiva, among the most important are the clans of the 8 Mothers (matris or matrikas). Yoginis are often theriomorphic, having the forms of animals, represented in statuary as female figures with animal heads. Yoginis are associated with "actual shapeshifting" into female animals, and the ability to transform other people. They are linked with the Bhairava cult, often carrying skulls and other tantric symbols, and practising in cremation grounds and other liminal places. They are powerful, impure, and dangerous. They both protect and disseminate esoteric tantric knowledge. They have siddhis, extraordinary powers, including the power of flight; many yoginis have the form of birds or have a bird as their vahana or animal vehicle. In later Tantric Buddhism, dakini, a female spirit able to fly, is often used synonymously with yogini. The scholar Shaman Hatley writes that the archetypal yogini is "the autonomous Sky-traveller (khecari)", and that this power is the "ultimate attainment for the siddhi-seeking practitioner".

A Shaiva cult of yoginis flourished roughly between 700 and 1200. It is documented in the Brahmayamalatantra scripture. Non-yoginis consulted yoginis in "visionary, transactional encounters". The cult led to the building of stone temples from the 10th to perhaps the 13th centuries, across the Indian subcontinent.

=== Rediscovery ===
India's major extant shrines of the 64 Yoginis (Chausathi Jogan) are in Odisha and Madhya Pradesh. Alexander Cunningham visited and described them in the 19th century for the Archaeological Survey of India, and they were then largely forgotten. In 1986, Vidya Dehejia recorded that the shrines were "remote and difficult of access", scarcely explored for a hundred years, and frequented by dacoits, gangs of robbers, who used the temples as places of refuge unknown to the authorities. The well-preserved Chausathi Yogini Temple at Hirapur was only rediscovered in 1953, despite its proximity to the Bhubaneshwar temple site, something Dehejia describes as "quite amazing".

=== Characteristics ===
Infographic on significance of Yogini temples, showing design for communion with yoginis, thought to be capable of flight

The Yogini shrines are usually circular enclosures, and they are hypaethral, open to the sky, unlike most Indian temples. Inside the circular wall are niches, most often 64, containing statues of female figures, the yoginis. Their bodies are described as beautiful, but their heads are often those of animals. Yogini temples normally stood somewhat outside the main group of temples, and at the highest point of the site.

The iconographies of the yogini statues in the yogini temples are not uniform, nor are the yoginis the same in each set of 64. In the Hirapur temple, all the yoginis are depicted with their Vahanas (animal vehicles) and in standing posture. In the Ranipur-Jharial temple the yogini images are in dancing posture. In the Bhedaghat temple, the yoginis are seated in lalitasana, the royal position, and are surrounded by cremation-ground scenes complete with "flesh-eating ghouls" and scavenging animals.

=== Significance ===
Hatley, following Vidya Dehejia, suggests that the yogini temples relate to the tantric yogini-chakra. This is a "mandala of mantra-goddesses surrounding Shiva/Bhairava, installation of which ... was central to the ritual of the esoteric Shaiva cult of yoginis." Chapter 9 of the Kaulajnana Nimaya, attributed to the 10th-century sage Matsyendranath, describes a system of 8 chakras represented as eight-petalled lotus flowers, the total of 64 petals denoting the 64 yoginis.

Hatley comments that "tantric worship of 'circles' of yoginis (yoginichakras) appears to predate the temples by at least two centuries, and the remarkable congruity in Shaiva textual representations of yoginis and their depiction in sculpture suggest direct continuity" between the practices described in tantric texts and the yogini temples.

=== Practices ===
Hindu tantric practices were secret. However, texts from c. 600 CE describe esoteric rituals, often linked to cremation grounds. Female practitioners of Hindu tantrism, also called yoginis, were seen as embodying the superhuman yoginis.

Activities included Prana Pratishtha, the ritual consecration of images, such as of yoginis. Present-day rituals of this type can last three days, with a team of priests, involving ritual purification, an eye-opening ceremony, worship (yogini puja), invocation of protectors, and the preparation of a yantra diagram containing a yogini mandala and an array of areca nuts for the 64 goddesses. The earliest yogini practices were kapalika mortuary rites.

The Varanasimahatmya of the Bhairavapradurbhava describes ceremonies of worship involving singing and dancing in the yogini temple at Varanasi, summarised by Peter Bisschop:

For men who worship there nothing becomes in vain. Those who stay awake that night, performing the great festival of song and dance, and worship the circle of kulayoginis at daybreak, acquire the Kaula knowledge from them ... All Yoginis delight in that abode in the centre of Varanasi. The goddess Vikata stands there, it is the most divine abode.

The Kashikhanda section of the Skandapurana, which narrates the myth of the arrival in disguise of the 64 yoginis in Varanasi, states that worship can be simple, since the yoginis only need daily gifts of fruit, incense, and light. It prescribes a major ritual for the autumn, with fire libations, recitation of the names of the yoginis, and ritual offerings, while all residents of Varanasi should visit the temple in springtime at the festival of Holi to respect the goddesses.

Dehejia writes that

It seems probable that the Kaula Chakra [tantric ritual circle] was formed within the circle of the Yogini temple, with offerings to the Yoginis of matsya [fish], mamsa [meat], mudra [gesture], madya [alcohol], and finally maithuna [tantric sex] too.

Active worship (puja) continues in some yogini temples, such as at Hirapur.

== 64-yogini shrines ==
=== Hirapur ===
The small 9th-century yogini temple at Hirapur, only 25 feet in diameter, is in Khurda district, Odisha, 10 miles south of Bhubaneshwar. 60 of the yoginis are arranged in a circle around a small rectangular shrine that may have contained a Shiva image. The circle is reached via a protruding entrance passage, so that the plan of the temple has the form of a yoni-pedestal for a Shiva lingam. At least 8 of the yoginis stand on animal vehicles representing signs of the zodiac, including a crab, a scorpion, and a fish, suggesting a link with astrology or calendrical work.

The scholar István Keul writes that the yogini images are of dark chlorite rock, about 40 cm tall, and standing in varying poses on plinths or vahanas; most have "delicate features and sensual bodies with slender waists, broad hips, and high, round breasts" with varying hairstyles and body ornaments. He states that the central structure is faced with three yogini images and "four naked ithyphallic representations of Bhairava".

Around the outside of the temple are nine unsmiling goddesses, locally described as the nine katyayanis, an unusual feature for a yogini temple. The entrance is flanked by a pair of male dvarapala, door guardians. Two additional images near the dvarapalas may be bhairavas. The scholar Shaman Hatley suggests that if the temple is seen as a tantric mandala embodied in stone, Shiva is surrounded by 4 yoginis and 4 bhairavas of an inner circuit, and sixty yoginis of an outer circuit.

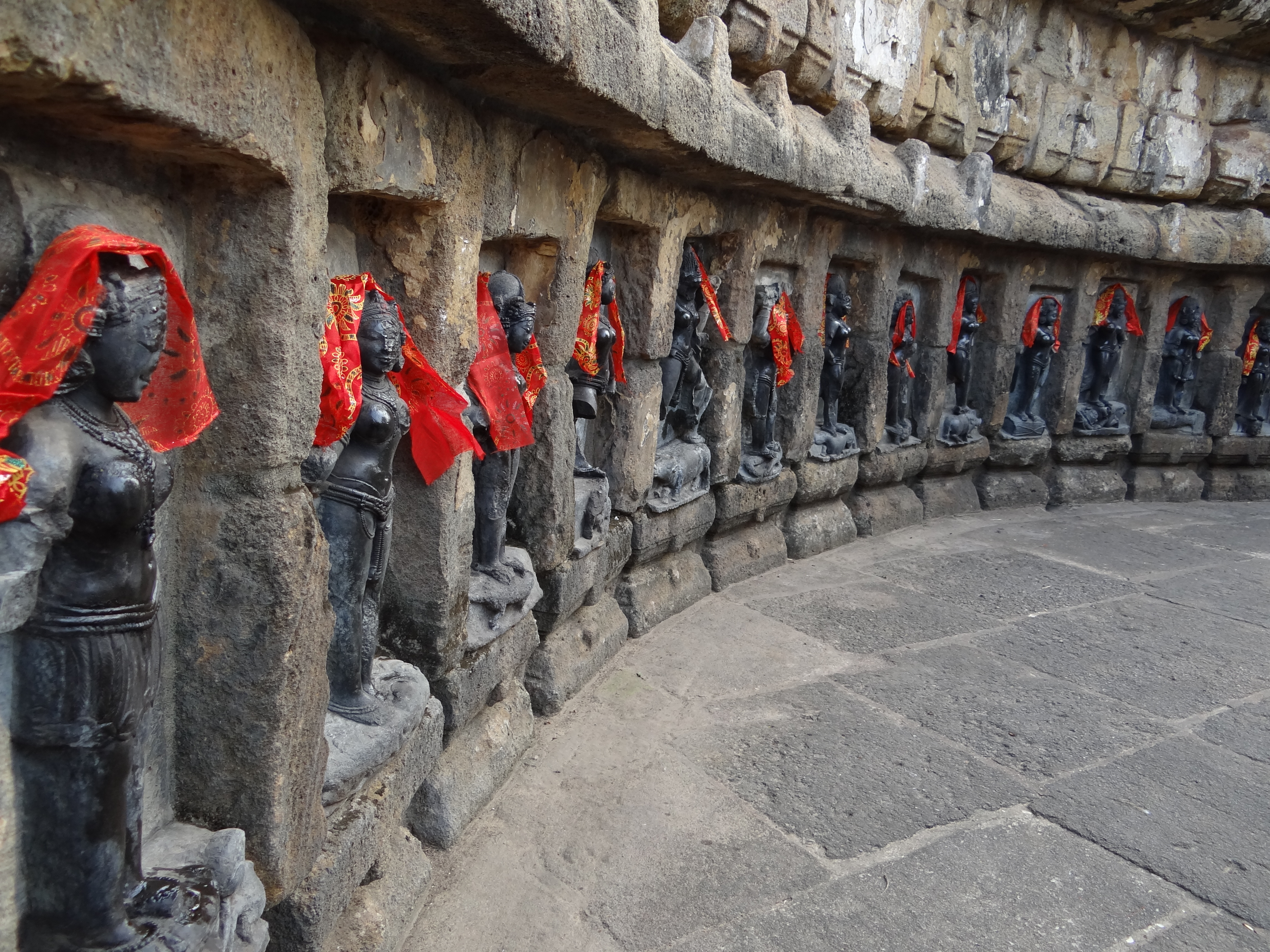
Chausathi Yogini Temple, Hirapur, Odisha, 2012. The yoginis have recently been venerated with a gift of headscarves.

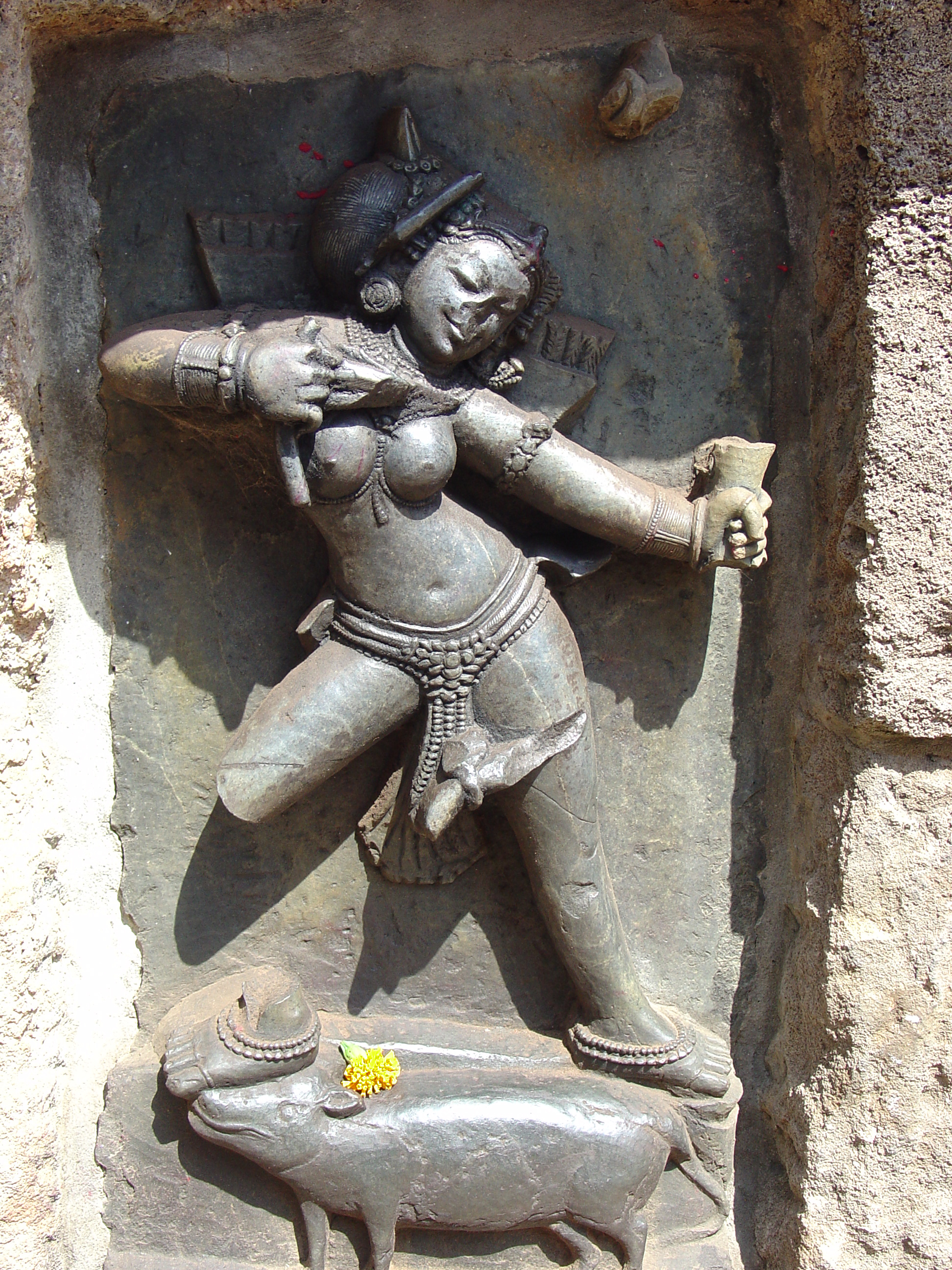
One of the Hirapur yoginis, with an offering of flowers at her feet

Plan; scholars have noted the resemblance to a yoni-pedestal

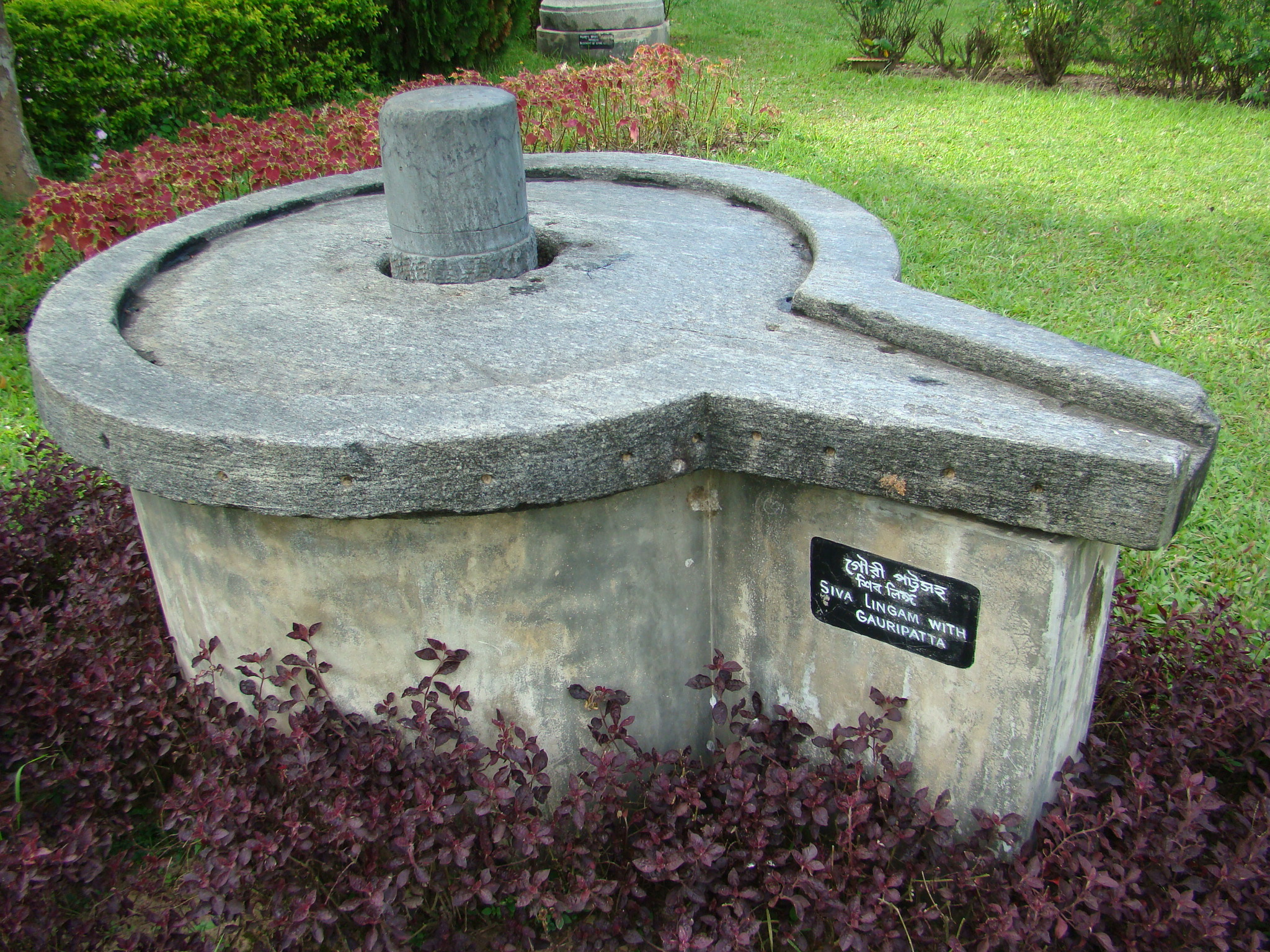
A yoni-pedestal with central Shiva lingam, for comparison

=== Ranipur-Jharial, Balangir ===
The Chausathi Yogini Pitha in Ranipur-Jharial, near the towns of Titilagarh and Kantabanjhi in Balangir district, Odisha, is a larger hypaethral 64-yogini temple. 62 of the yogini images survive. At the centre is a shrine with four pillars, holding an image of Nateshwar, Shiva as Lord of Dance. The similar-sized image of Chamunda in the temple may once have been housed with Shiva in the central shrine.

Ranipur-Jharial was the first of the Yogini temples to be discovered; it was described by Major-General John Campbell in 1853.

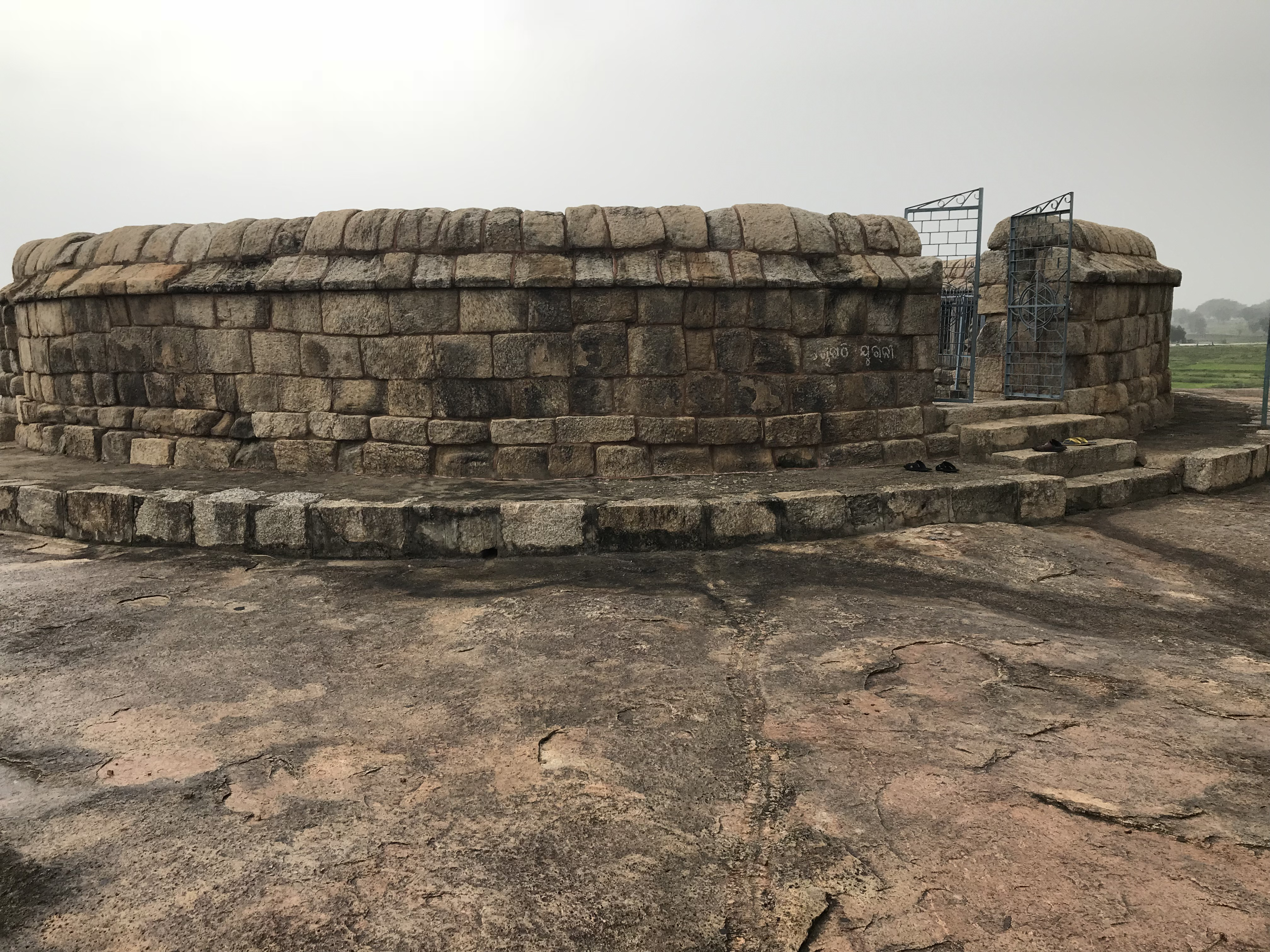
Exterior of the Ranipur-Jharial yogini temple

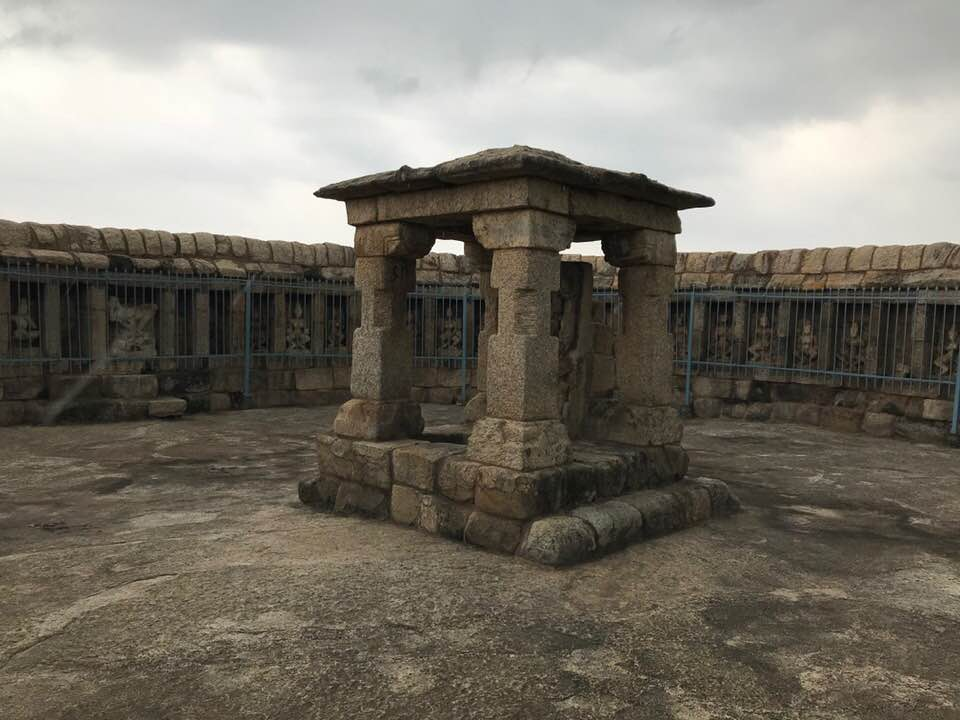
Simple 4-pillared central shrine

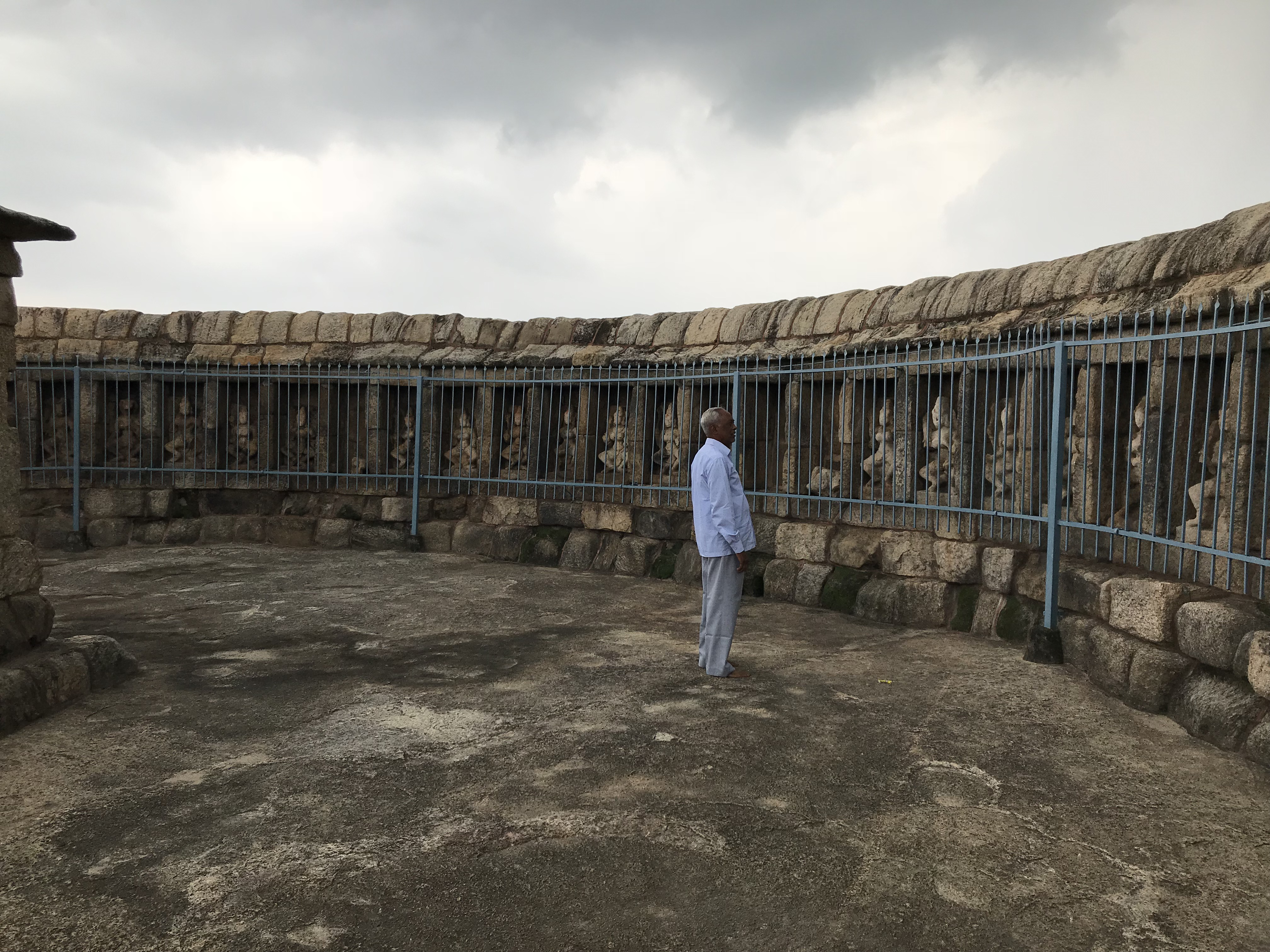
Yogini images in cells in the perimeter wall

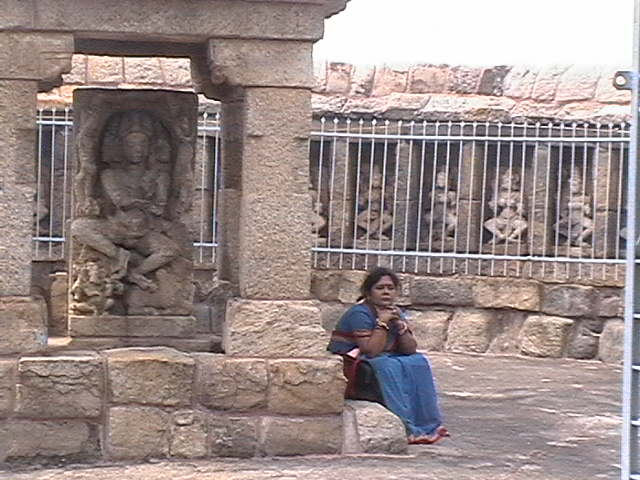
Statue of Nateshwar, Shiva as Lord of Dance, in central shrine

=== Khajuraho ===
The 9th- or 10th-century yogini temple at Khajuraho, Madhya Pradesh, lies to the southwest of the western group of temples in Khajuraho, near Chhatarpur in Chhatarpur District, and is the oldest temple on the site. It is rectangular, unlike the other yogini temples, but like them is hypaethral. There is no sign of a central shrine; the central deity, whether that was Shiva or the Goddess, was apparently housed in the niche, larger than the rest, opposite the entrance. It was constructed with 65 shrine cells (10 on the front, 11 at the back including the one for the central deity, and 22 on each side), each with a doorway made of two squared granite pillars and a lintel stone, and each with a tower roof. 35 of the cells survive. It stands on a 5.4 metre high platform. Three squat images, of Brahmani, Maheshwari and Hingalaja (Mahishamardini), survived at the site and are on display in the museum there.

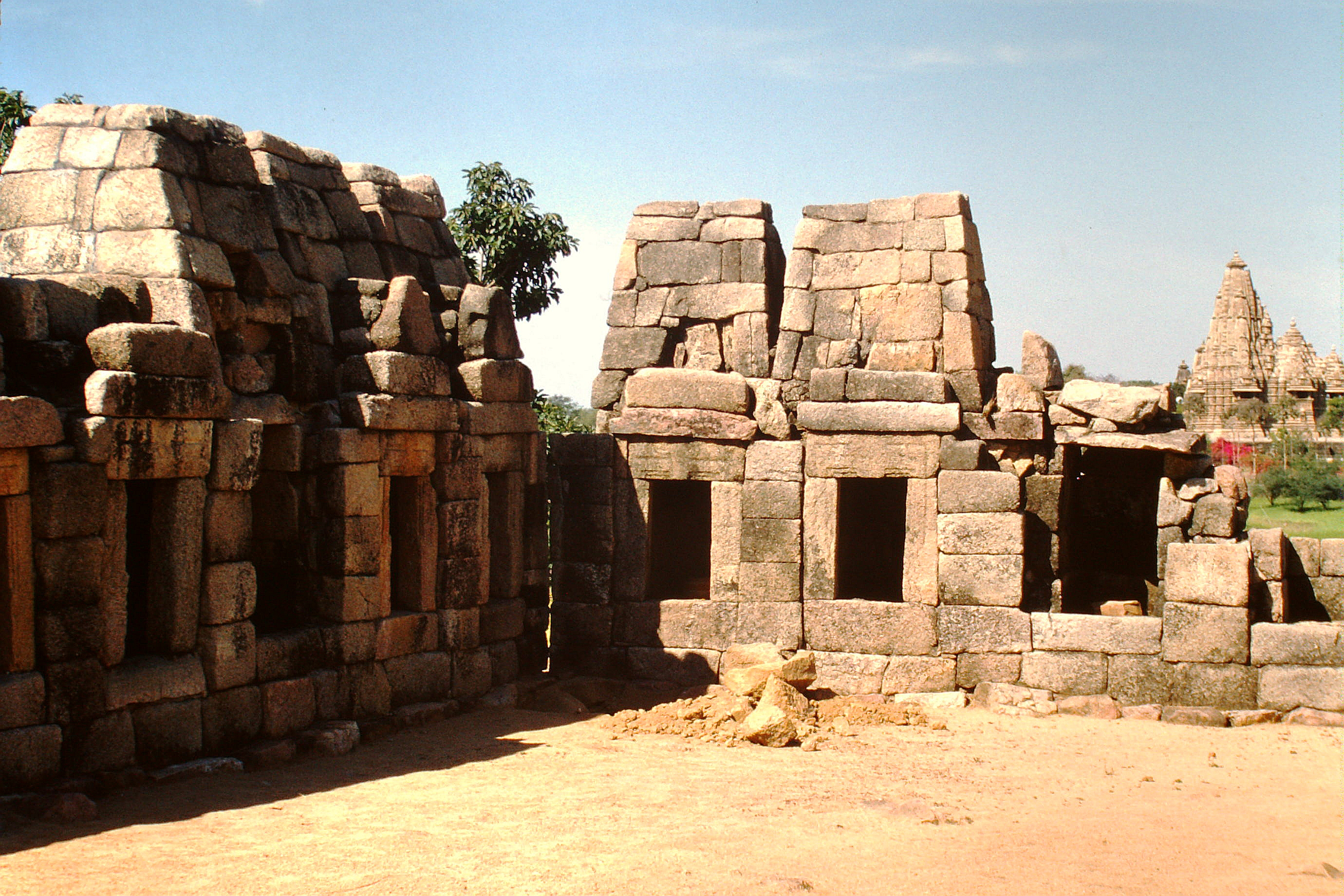
Khajuraho's Yogini temple is unusual in being rectangular.

Plan, with 64 small shrines around a rectangular courtyard, and one larger shrine opposite the entrance

=== Mitaoli, Morena ===
The well-preserved 11th-century yogini temple at Mitaoli (also spelt Mitavali and Mitawali) in Morena district, Madhya Pradesh, 30 miles north of Gwalior, also called Ekattarso Mahadeva Temple, has a central mandapa sacred to Shiva in an open circular courtyard with 65 niches. The niches are now all filled with statues of Shiva, but they once held statues of 64 yoginis and a deity.

The hypaethral temple stands alone on top of a rocky hill. The entrance is directly into the circular wall. The outside of the temple is adorned with small niches that once held statues of couples with maidens on either side, but most of these are now lost or heavily damaged. It is not clear why the temple had 65 rather than 64 cells; Dehejia notes the suggestion that the extra cell was for Devi, the consort of Shiva, who has the pavilion at the temple's centre, so the divine couple were then surrounded by the 64 yoginis. She observes that this could also explain the 65th cell at Khajuraho, in which case there would once have been a central shrine to Shiva there also.

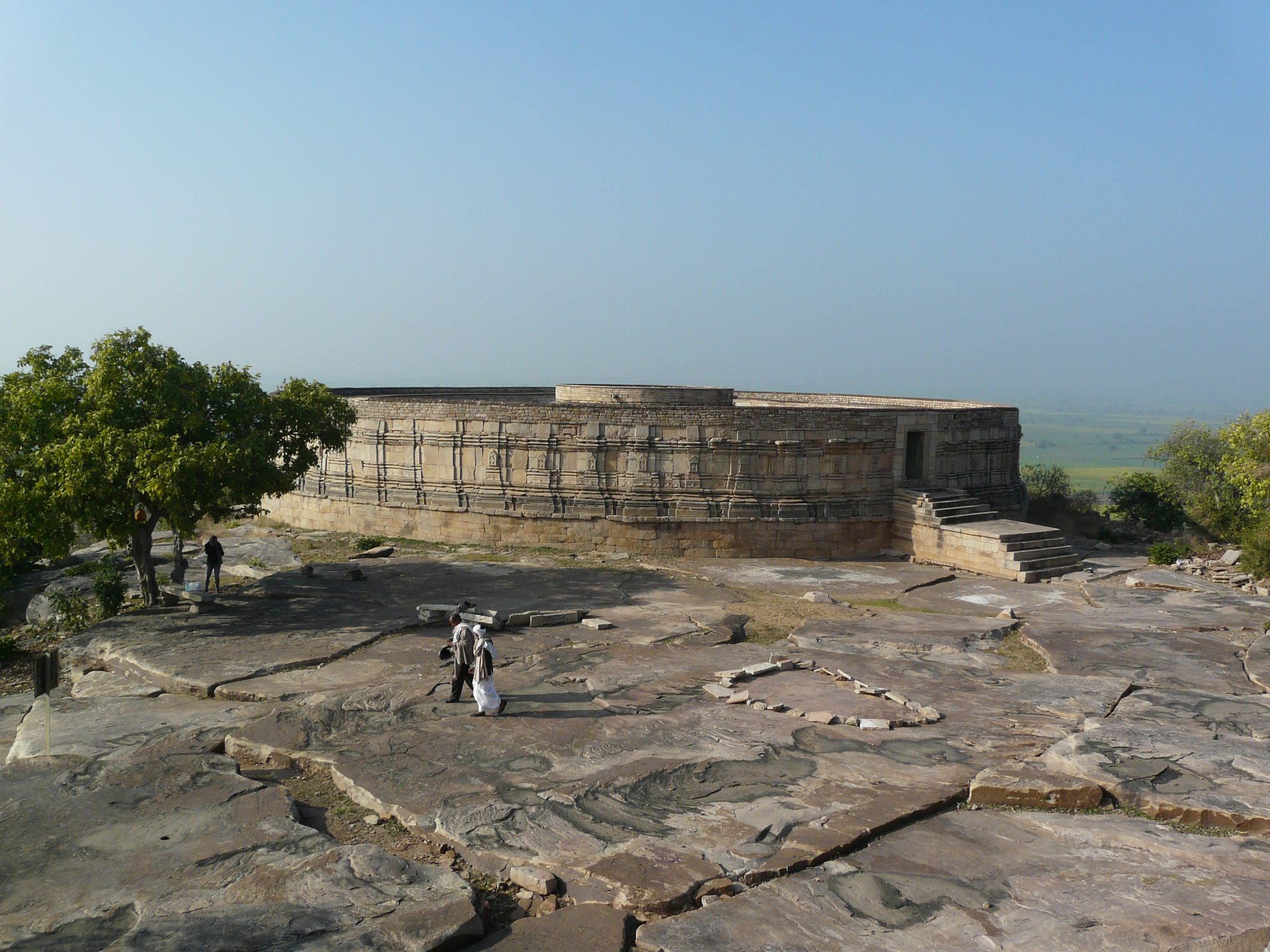
Exterior of the yogini temple at Mitaoli

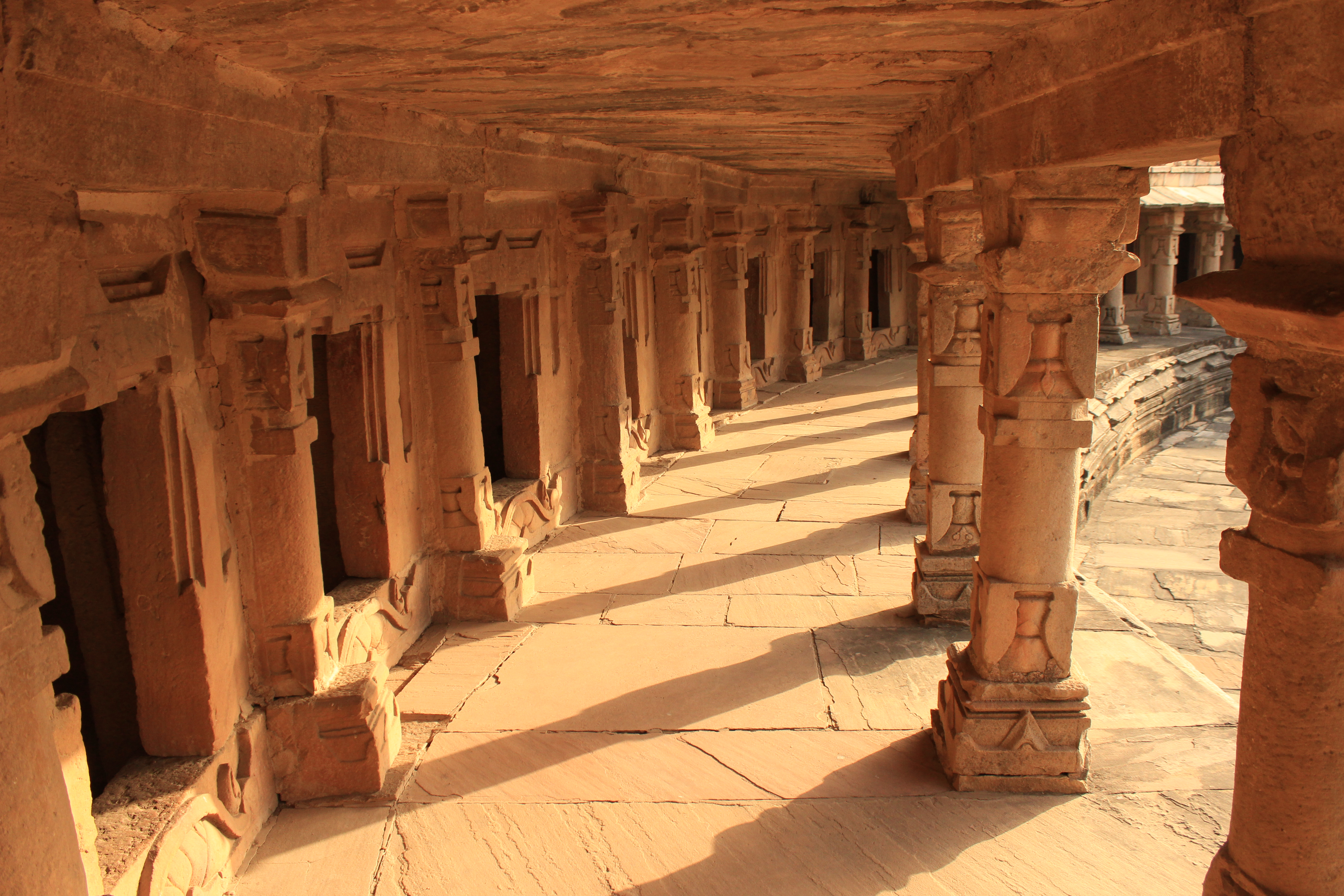
Walkway around the circle of yogini shrines

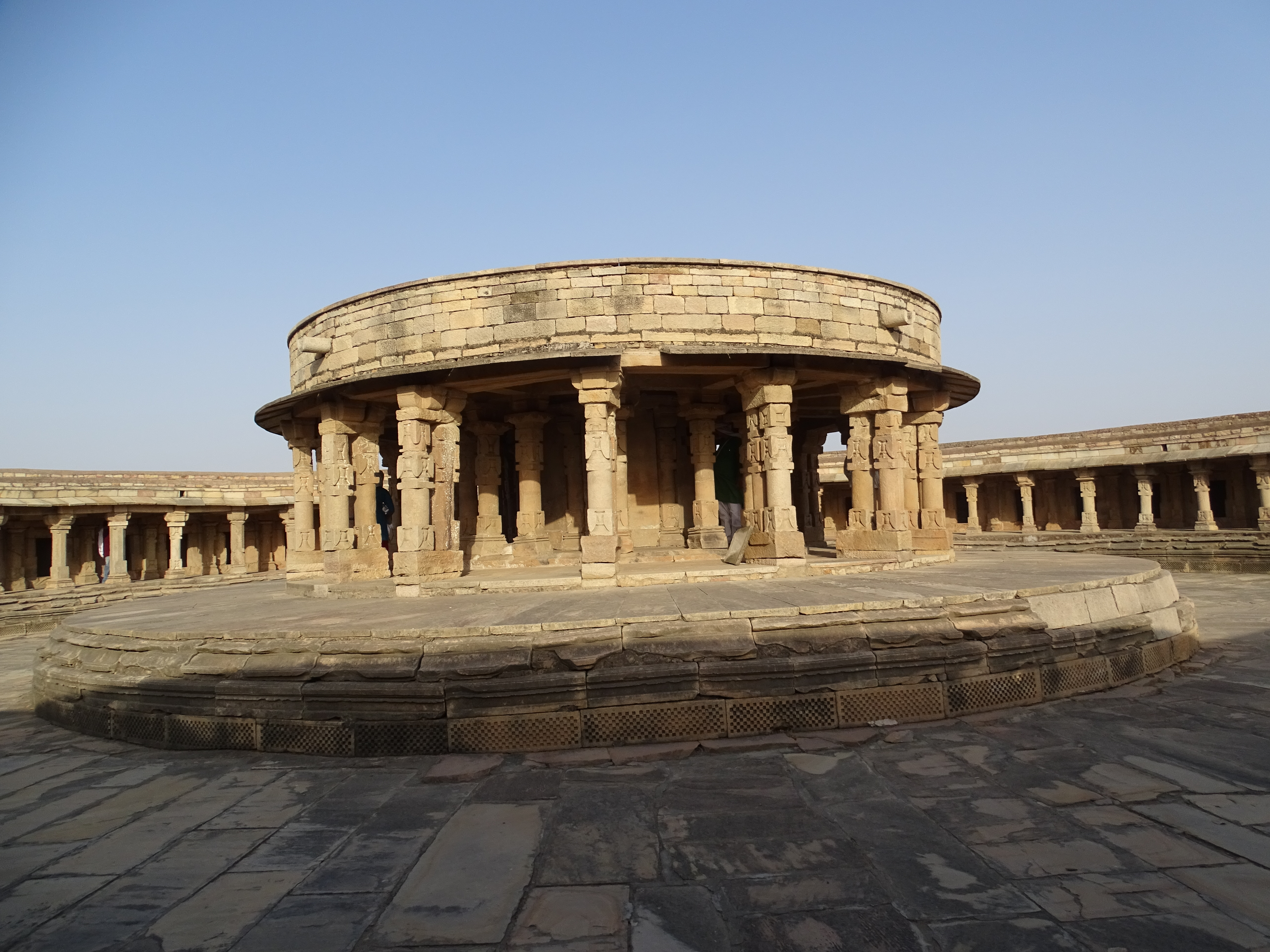
A shrine to Shiva is at the centre of the circle.

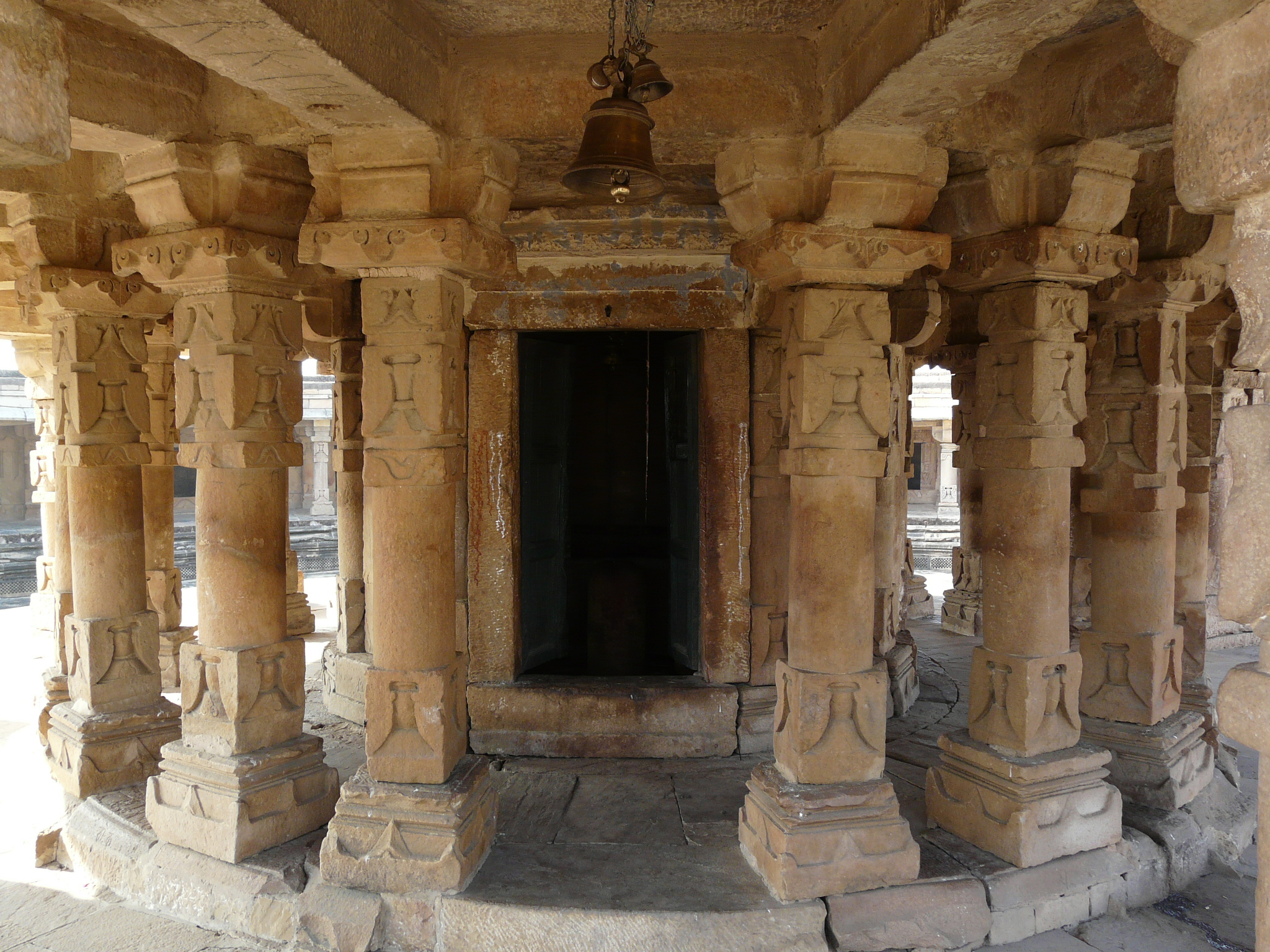
Detail of the Shiva shrine

== 81-yogini shrine ==
=== Bhedaghat, Jabalpur ===
The 10th-century Yogini temple in Bhedaghat (also written Bheraghat), near Jabalpur in Jabalpur district, Madhya Pradesh, is a shrine to 81 yoginis. It is the largest of the circular yogini temples, some 125 feet in diameter. Hatley calls Bhedagat the "most imposing and perhaps best known of the yogini temples". The temple had a covered walkway with 81 cells for yoginis around the inside of its circular wall. There is a later shrine in the centre of the courtyard. The 81 images include 8 Matrikas, Mother goddesses, from an earlier time.

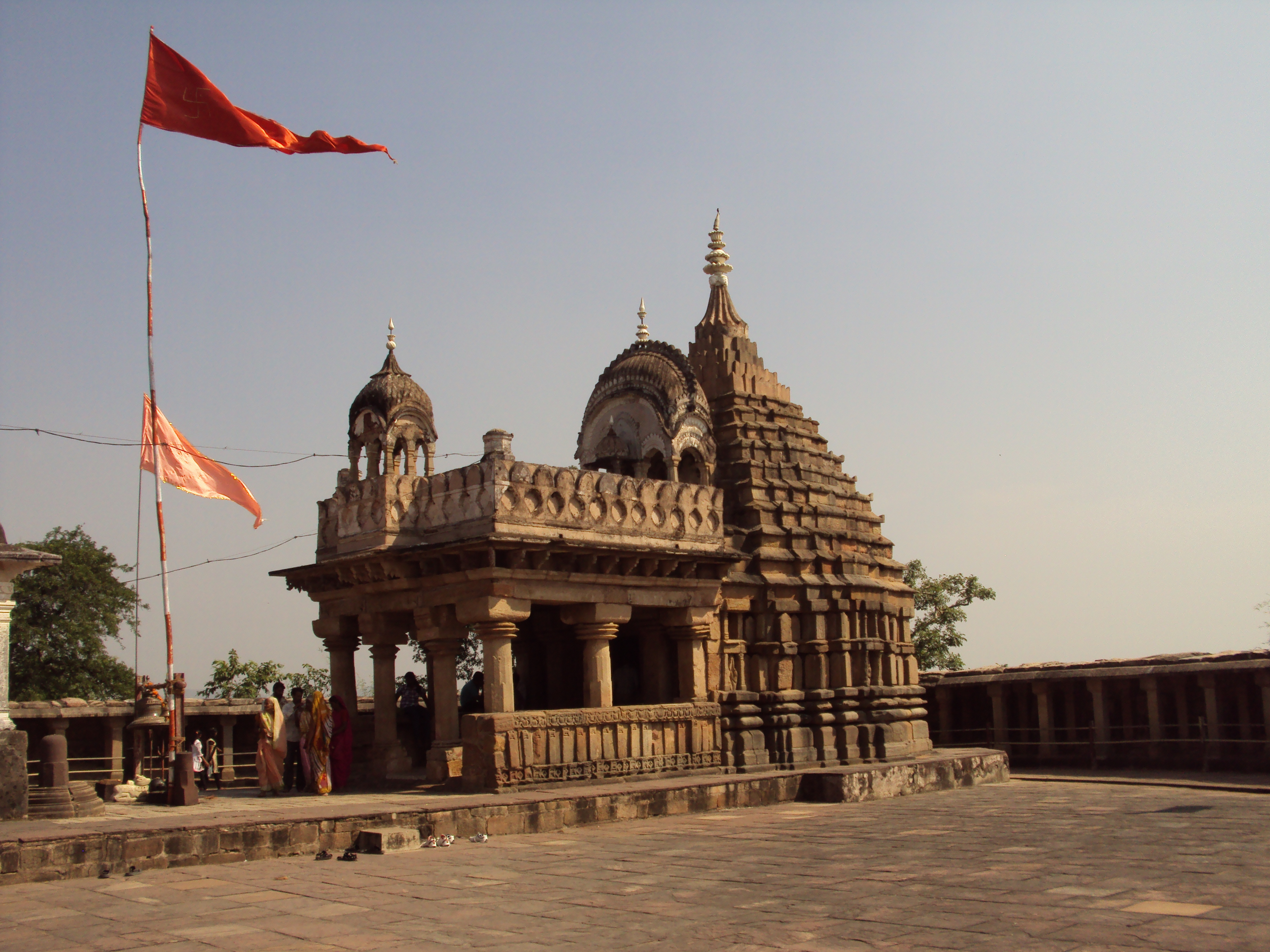
Inside the yogini temple, Bhedaghat, Jabalpur; the central shrine with shikhara is of later date.

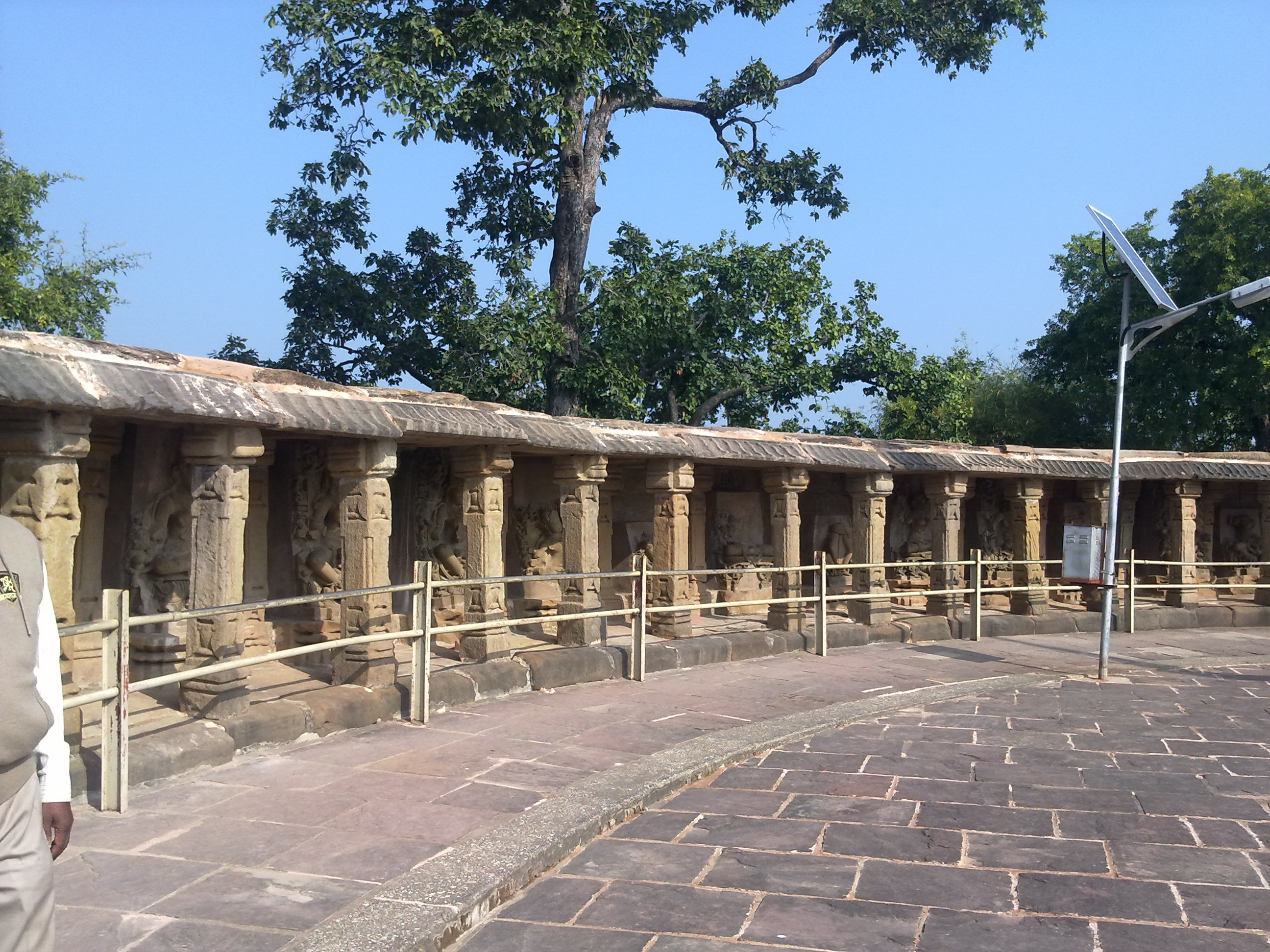
The circular wall has niches for 81 yoginis.

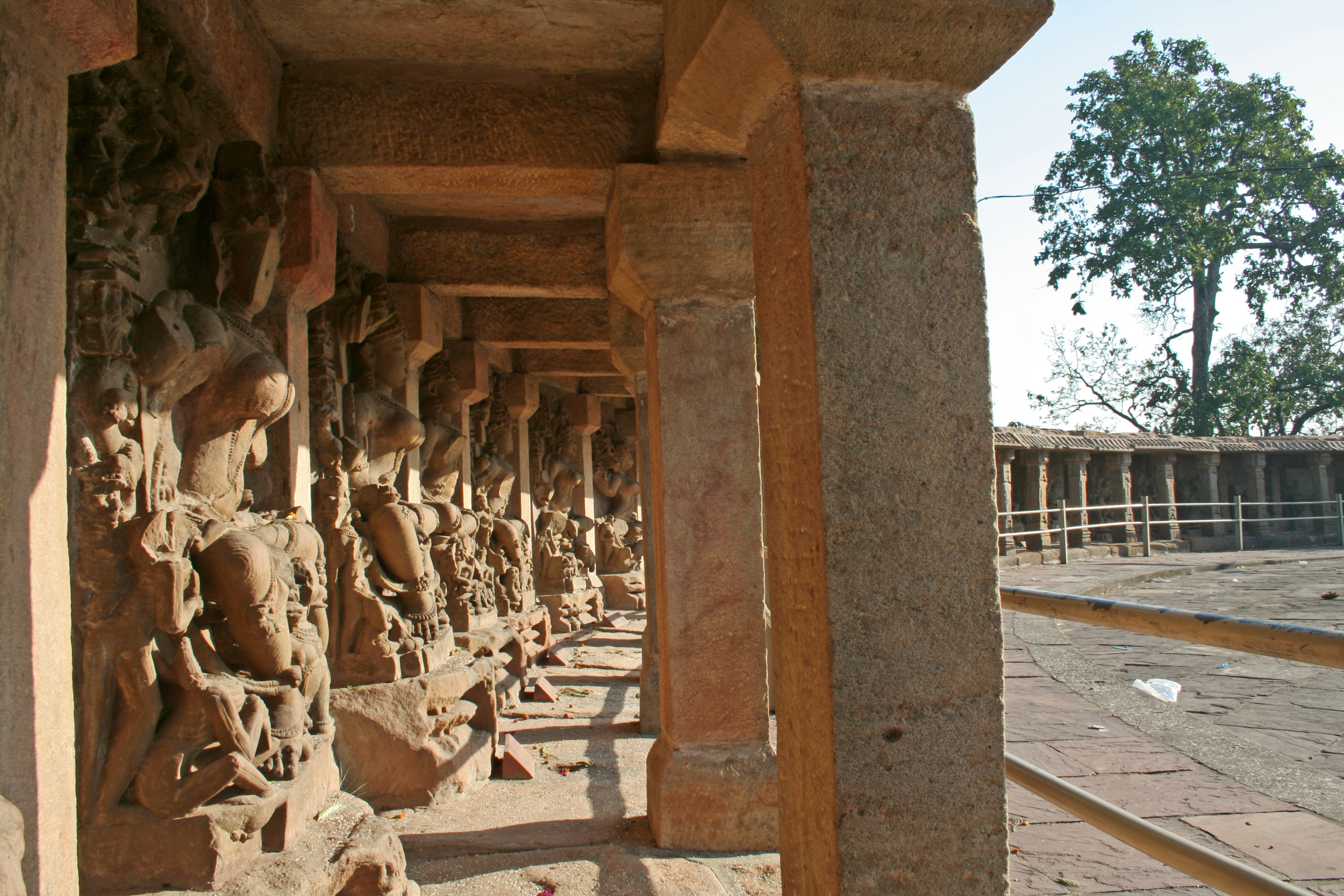
Yogini images

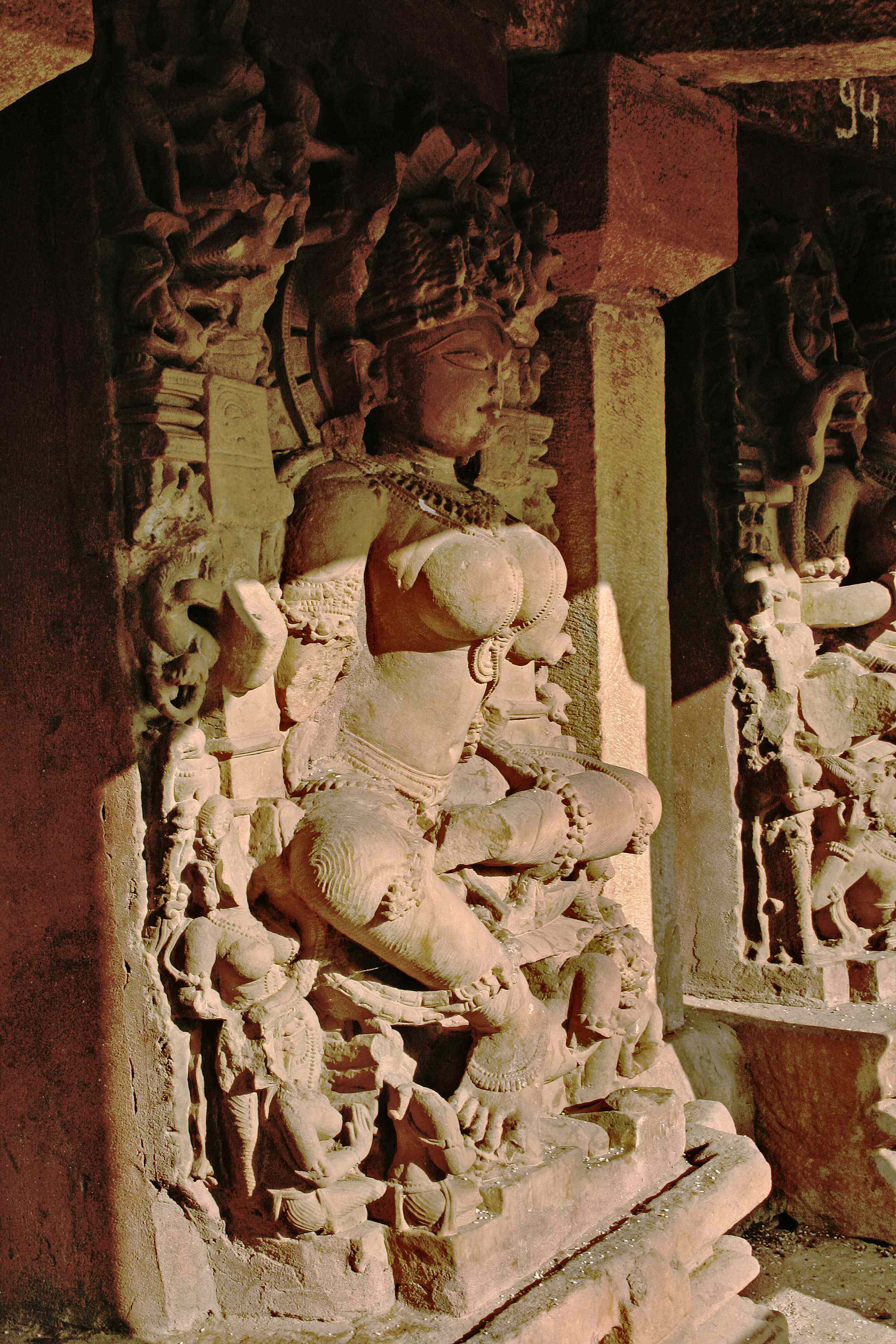
Yogini, seated in Lalitasana

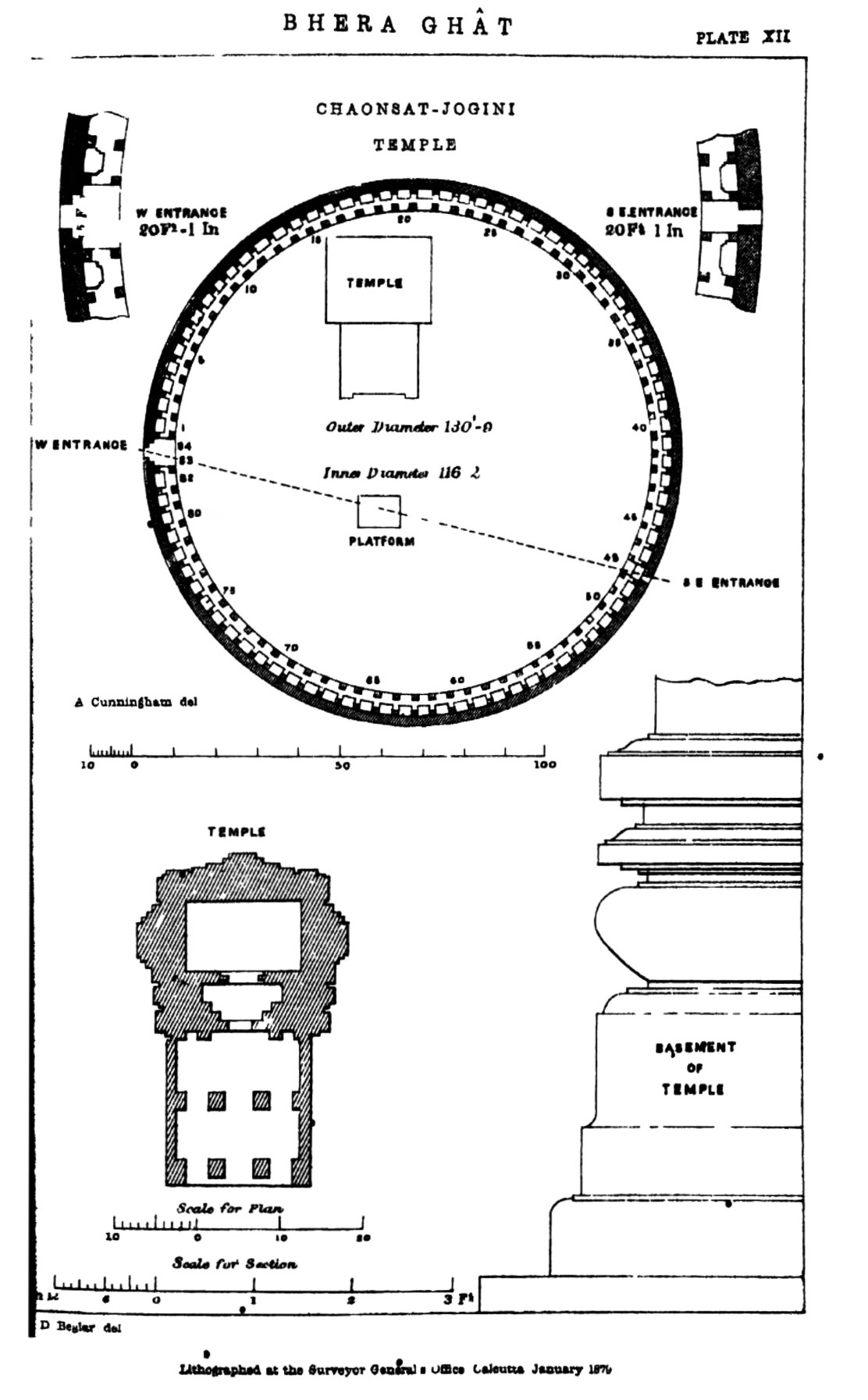
Yogini temple plan, giving outer diameter as 130 feet

== 42-yogini shrines ==
=== Dudahi ===
The temple at Dudahi, locally named Akhada, near Lalitpur in Uttar Pradesh, now in ruins, had a circular plan with niches for 42 yoginis. The circle is 50 feet in diameter.

=== Badoh ===
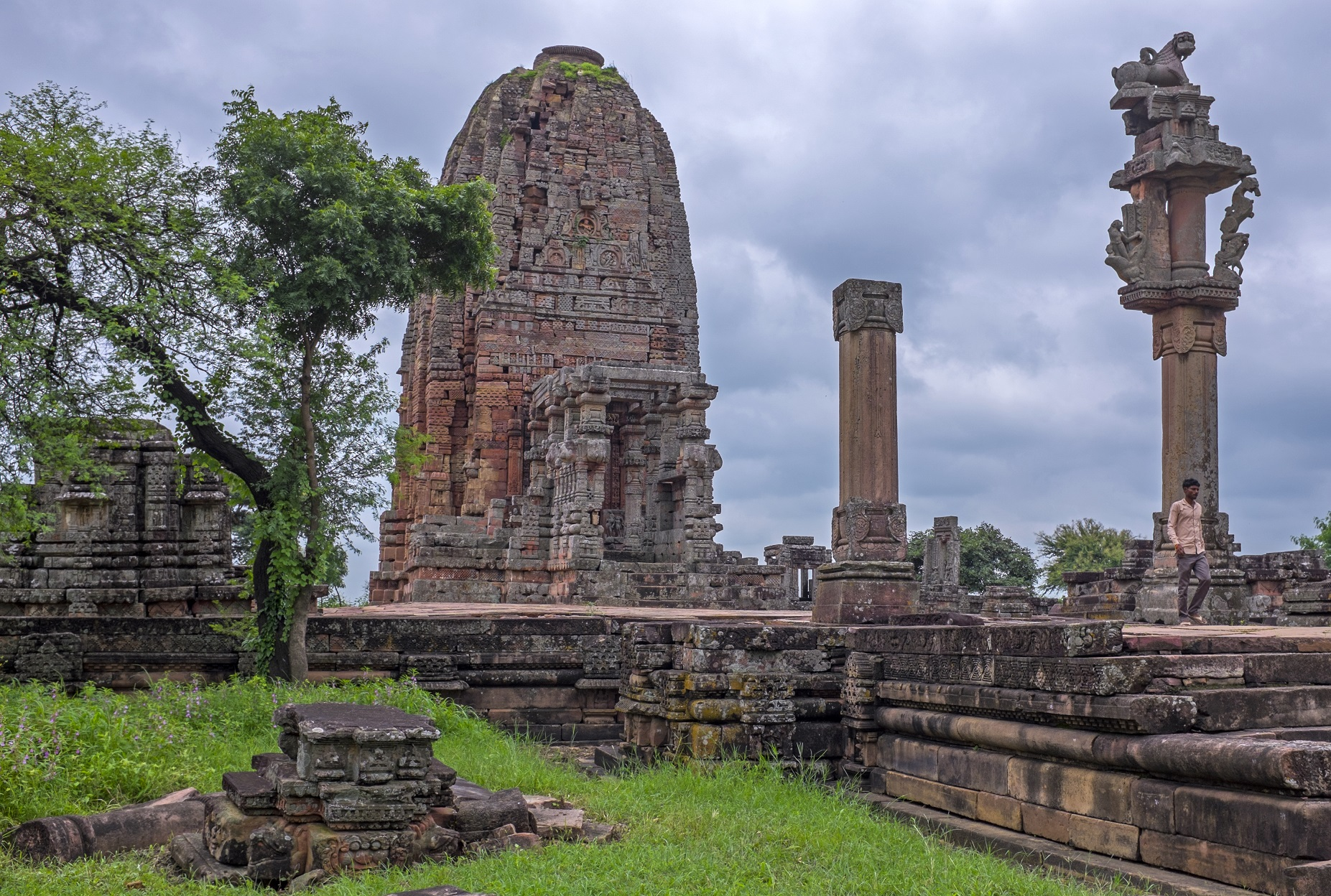
Gadarmal temple of the Mothers, Badoh, Uttar Pradesh, has 42 niches for yoginis.

Some 30 miles from Dudahi, at Badoh in Vidisha district, Madhya Pradesh is the Gadarmal temple of the Mothers, another 42-niche yogini temple, and one of the few that are rectangular. 18 broken images of the goddesses that once fitted into grooves in the temple platform are preserved from the waist down. It is composed of a rectangular shrine and a tall and massive Shikhara, adjacent to some Jain temples. Vidya Dehejia writes that the yogini temple must once have been hypaethral.

The two 42-yogini shrines probably date from sometime between 950 and 1100.

== Lost shrines ==
Several yogini temples have been lost, whether through deliberate destruction or plundering for building materials. These include the following.

=== Lokhari ===
There appears to have been an early 10th-century yogini temple on a hilltop at Lokhari, Banda District, Uttar Pradesh. A set of twenty images, nearly all theriomorphic, the figures having the heads of animals such as horse, cow, rabbit, snake, buffalo, goat, bear, and deer, has been recorded. Dehejia describes these as striking rather than specially artistic.

=== Nareshwar ===
Another set of twenty 10th-century images, with careless later inscriptions from the 12th century, was rescued from Nareshwar (also called Naleshvar and Naresar) in Madhya Pradesh, a site which still has some twenty small Shaivite temples, to the Gwalior Museum, some fifteen miles away.

=== Hinglajgarh ===
The site of Hinglajgarh, on the border of Madhya Pradesh and Rajasthan, was cleared of statuary for the building of the Gandhi Sagar Dam. The rescued statues contain enough fragments of yogini images for Dehejia to state that there was once a yogini temple at Hinglajgarh. (Note: Stella Dupuis, author of The Yoginī Temples of India, has placed a set of photographs of the Hinglajgarh yoginis on her website.)

=== Rikhiyan ===
Some 150 miles north of Khajuraho on the south bank of the River Yamuna, in the Banda District, Uttar Pradesh, are the fragmentary remains of what seems to have been a rectangular 64-Yogini temple in the Rikhiyan valley. This is part of a complex of other temples, unlike the solitary Yogini temples such as Mitaoli. When the site was photographed in 1909, ten four-Yogini slabs were present. Dehejia states that the multiples of 4 suggest a 64-Yogini total, while the straightness of the slabs implies a rectangular plan (as at Khajuraho). Seven were stolen on various occasions, and the last 3 of the slabs were moved to Gadhwa fort nearby for their safety. The slabs portray the Yoginis on a plain background without the usual attendant figures. They sit in the ceremonial pose of Lalitasana, one leg resting on their animal vehicle. They have "heavy breasts, broad waist[s] and large stomach[s]". One has the head of a horse, and holds a corpse, a severed head, a club, and a bell, and so may be Hayanana, "The Horse-headed". This and other Yoginis shown with corpses link the temple to a corpse ritual. Also photographed in 1909 were three three-Matrika slabs; Dehejia suggests that these formed part of a rectangular shrine to the Eight Matrikas accompanied by Ganesh. A well-preserved four-Yogini slab from Rikhiyan is held in the Denver Art Museum.

=== Shahdol ===
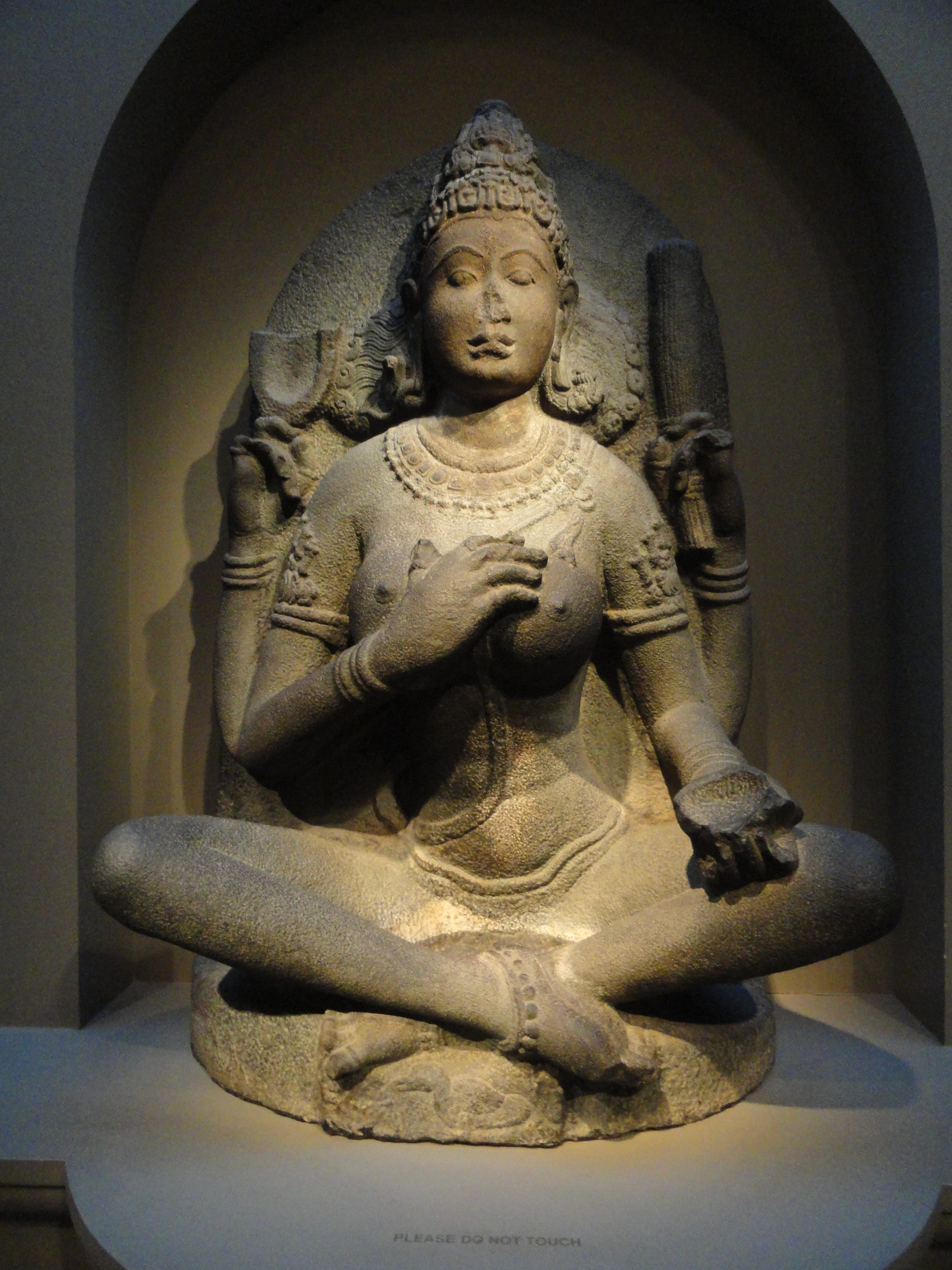
A 10th-century Yogini from Kaveripakkam, now in Arthur M. Sackler Gallery. She is holding a skull-cup.

Yogini images from Shahdol district (anciently Sahasa-dollaka) in Madhya Pradesh have been taken to the Dhubela Museum near Khajuraho, the Indian Museum at Calcutta, and the village temples of Antara and Panchgaon in Shahdol district. The yoginis are seated in the ceremonial Lalitasana pose, and they have haloes flanked by flying figures behind their heads.

=== Kanchipuram or Kaveripakkam ===
Dehejia publishes and discusses yogini images of the Chola period, around 900 CE, recovered from northern Tamil Nadu. These include one now in the British Museum, others in the Madras Museum, the Brooklyn Museum, the Minneapolis Institute of Arts, the Detroit Institute of Arts, and the Royal Ontario Museum. The British Museum yogini is ascribed to Kanchipuram; the collection site is not known, but many sculptures of the same style were recovered from a large "tank" (artificial lake) at Kaveripakkam, seemingly derived from nearby temples. The image formed part of a large set of yoginis.

=== Greater Bengal ===
There is evidence from inscriptions and archaeology that several yogini temples were built in greater Bengal. Dehejia notes that "texts on the Kaula Chakrapuja [worship in the tantric circle] indirectly reveal their Bengali origin in specifying varieties of fish known only in Bengal waters" and that "most of the texts containing lists of Yoginis were written in Bengal".

=== Varanasi ===
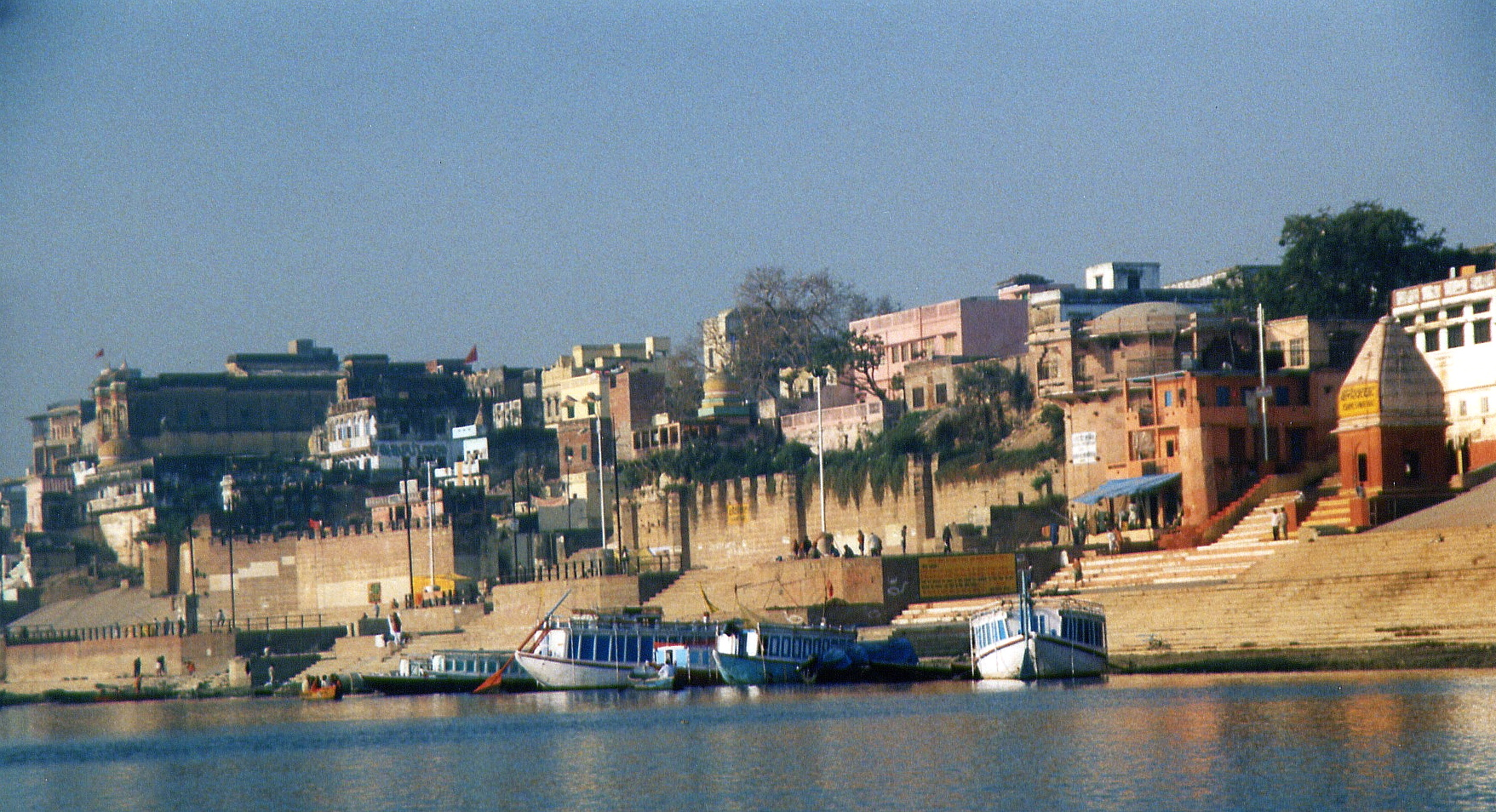
The cremation ground of Chaumsathi Ghat (far left) on the River Ganges at Varanasi

Texts from the 12th century CE, including the Varanasimahatmya of the Bhairavapradurbhava, suggest that there was a circular hypaethral yogini temple in Varanasi (also called Benares and Kashi) in the 11th century. Several yogini-related sites have been identified in the city. Just above the Chaumsathi Ghat cremation ground is Chaumsathi Devi temple; it is not mentioned in the scriptures, but is where modern-day devotees gather, especially at the Holi spring festival, as prescribed in the Kashikhanda.

=== Delhi ===
Legend has it that a yogini temple was built in the south Delhi district of Mehrauli; tradition places this as the Yogmaya Temple there, without reliable evidence. The region outside the imperial city of Indraprastha, described in the Mahabharata, was called Yoginipura, the yogini city. Indraprastha has been identified with Delhi.

== Influence ==
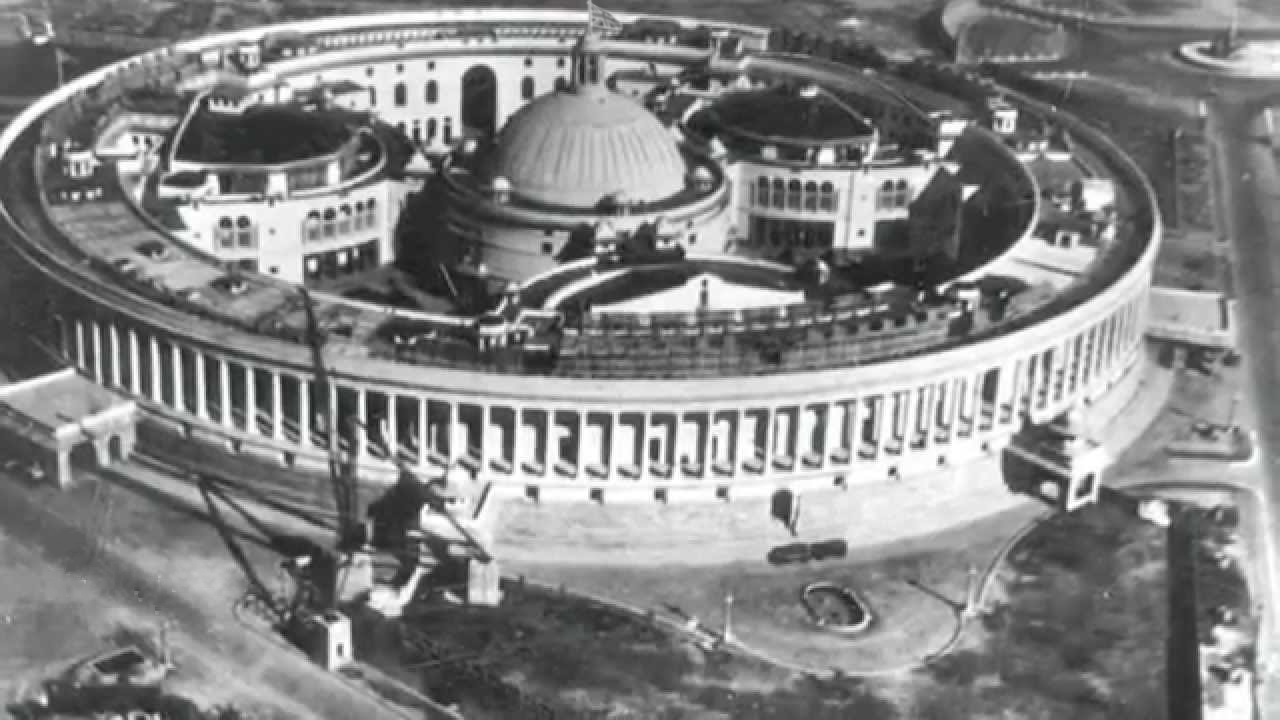
The circular Sansad Bhavan in New Delhi, home of India's parliament

The circular plan of the Mitaoli temple is popularly supposed, without reliable evidence, to have inspired the architecture of India's Parliament House, the Sansad Bhavan, which was designed by the British architects Sir Edwin Lutyens and Sir Herbert Baker in 1912-1913, and completed in 1927.

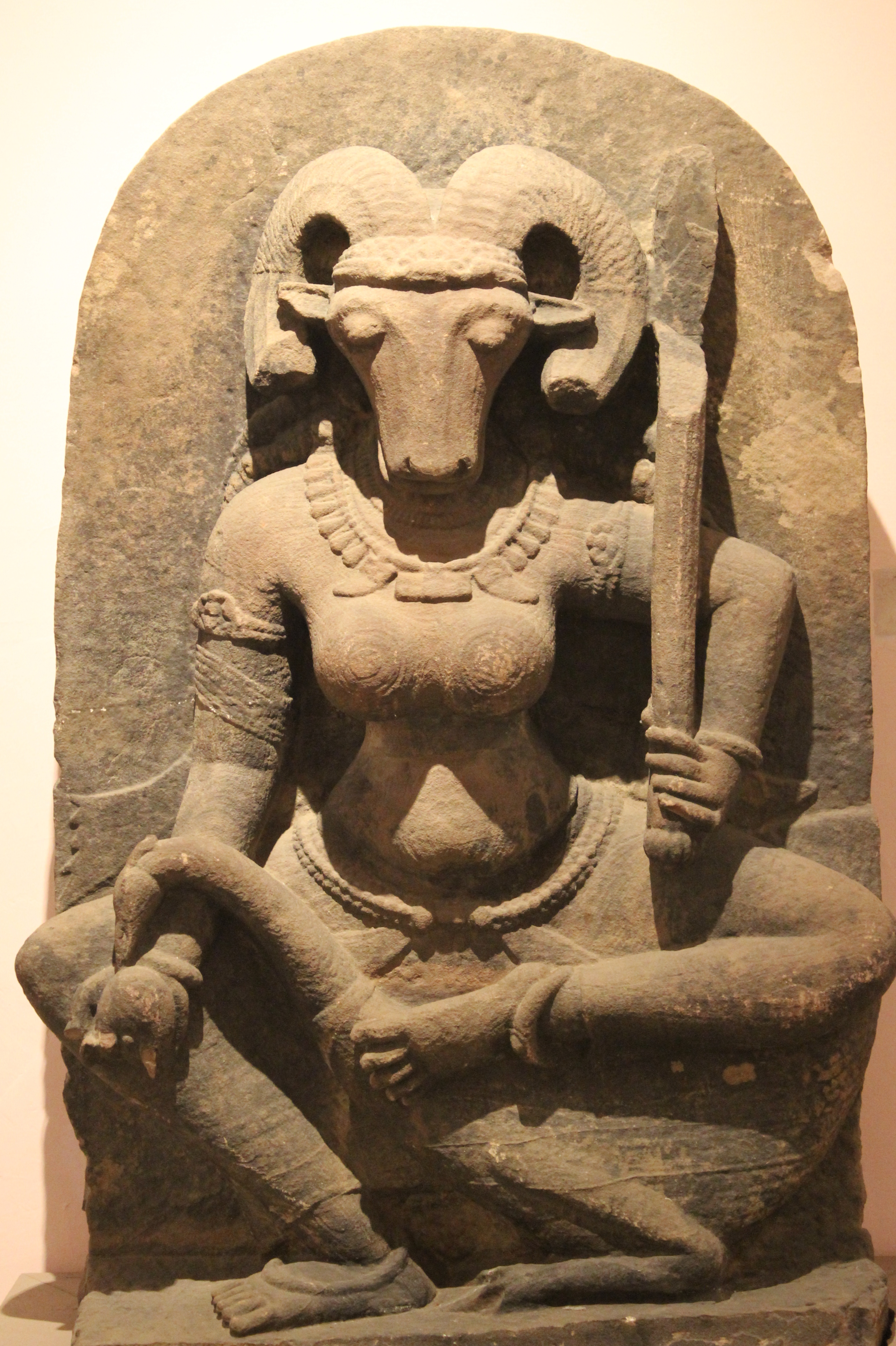
The buffalo-headed Vrishanana Yogini image stolen, smuggled to France, and recovered to India

A 10th-century buffalo-headed Vrishanana yogini was stolen from a museum in Uttar Pradesh and smuggled to France. The image was identified as one of those published in Dehejia's book, and the collector Robert Schrimpf was contacted by the National Museum, Delhi. His widow donated the sculpture to India in 2008, and it was returned in 2013, described as "priceless" by the Deccan Herald and welcomed "home" to the National Museum with a special exhibition. The newspaper noted that the isolated locations of yogini temples made them vulnerable to antique smugglers.

Padma Kaimal has written a travel book about the processes by which the yogini statues have been turned from religious images to artworks to be looted, smuggled, purchased, and collected in the western world.

== See also ==
- Yoga for women

== Sources ==
- Das, Adyasha (2019). The Chausathi Yoginis of Hirapur : from tantra to tourism. Bhubaneswar: Black Eagle Books. ISBN 978-1-64560-012-1. OCLC 1200743540.
- Dehejia, Vidya (1986). Yogini Cult and Temples: A Tantric Tradition. National Museum, Janpath, New Delhi.
- Donaldson, Thomas Eugene (2002). Tantra and Sakta Art of Orissa. New Delhi: D. K. Printworld. ISBN 978-8124601990.
- Dupuis, Stella (2008). The Yoginī Temples of India : in the pursuit of a mystery, travel notes. Varanasi: Pilgrims Publishing. ISBN 978-81-7769-665-3. OCLC 298129207.
- Hatley, Shaman (2007). The Brahmayāmalatantra and Early Śaiva Cult of Yoginīs. University of Pennsylvania (PhD Thesis, UMI Number: 3292099). pp. 1–459. Archived from the original on 23 July 2010.
- Hatley, Shaman (2014). "11: Goddesses in Text and Stone : Temples of the Yoginis in Light of Tantric and Puranic Literature". In Benjamin Fleming; Richard Mann (eds.). Material Culture and Asian Religions: Text, Image, Object. Routledge. pp. 195–226. ISBN 978-1138546141.
- Kaimal, Padma Audrey (2012). Scattered Goddesses: Travels with the Yoginis. Association for Asian Studies. ISBN 978-0-924304-67-5.
- Keul, István (2012). "Blending into the Religious Landscape: The Yoginīs in Benares". Numen. 59 (4). Brill: 366–402. doi:10.1163/156852712x641796. ISSN 0029-5973. JSTOR 23244944.
- Roy, Anamika (2015). Sixty-four Yoginis : cult, icons and goddesses. Delhi: Primus Books. ISBN 978-93-84082-12-3. OCLC 919909942.
- White, David Gordon (2006) [2003]. Kiss of the Yogini: 'Tantric Sex' in its South Asian Contexts. University of Chicago Press. ISBN 978-0226894843.
