= Shaman Hatley =

Yoga scholar

- Occupation: Yoga scholar
- Known for: Work on Yoginī temples, Kuṇḍalinī

Academic background
- Education: University of Pennsylvania
- Thesis: The Brahmayāmalatantra and the Early Saiva Cult of Yoginīs (2007)
- Website: UMass Boston

Shaman Hatley is a scholar of Asian religions, specializing in the goddess cults and tantric rituals of medieval India, including the yogini cults and the history of yoga.

== Biography ==
Hatley contributed to identifying the significance of India's medieval Yoginī temples.

Shaman Hatley was educated in liberal arts at Goddard College, graduating in 1998. He then studied Indology and religious studies at the University of Pennsylvania, gaining his PhD on the Brahmayāmalatantra and the Early Saiva Cult of Yoginīs there in 2007; he began teaching at Concordia University that same year. In 2015 he moved to the University of Massachusetts Boston, becoming the chair of Asian studies there in 2020.

Hatley's work on the yogini temples of India, starting with his dissertation, brought scholarly attention to their place in translating the purana literature and ritual mandalas into the dramatic circular architecture of these temples.

== Works ==
- 2007: "Mapping the Esoteric Body in the Islamic Yoga of Bengal", History of Religions, vol. 46, issue 4.
- 2012: "Tantric Śaivism in Early Medieval India: Recent Research and Future Directions", Religion Compass.
- 2012: "From Mātṛ to Yoginī: Continuity and Transformation in the South Asian Cults of the Mother Goddesses", Transformations and Transfer of Tantra in Asia and Beyond, ed. by István Keul. Walter de Gruyter.
- 2013: "What is a Yoginī? Towards a Polythetic Definition", "Yogini" in South Asia: Interdisciplinary Approaches, ed. by Istvan Keul. Routledge.
- 2014: "Kuṇḍalinī", Encyclopedia of Indian Religions, Springer.
- 2014: "Goddesses in Text and Stone: Temples of the Yoginīs in Light of Tantric and Purāṇic Literature." Material Culture and Asian Religions: Text, Image, Object, edited by Benjamin Fleming and Richard Mann. Routledge.
- 2015: "Śakti in Early Tantric Śaivism: Historical observations on goddesses, cosmology, and ritual in the Niśvāsatattvasaṃhitā"
- 2016: "Erotic Asceticism: The Razor's Edge Observance (asidhārāvrata) and the Early History of Tantric Coital Ritual", Bulletin of the School of Oriental & African Studies, vol. 79, issue 2.
- 2016: "Converting the Ḍākinī: Goddess Cults and Tantras of the Yoginīs between Buddhism and Śaivism", Tantric Traditions in Transmission and Translation, edited by David Gray and Ryan Richard Overbey. Oxford University Press.
- 2018: The Brahmayāmala or Picumata, Volume I: Chapters 1–2, 39–40, & 83. Revelation, Ritual, and Material Culture in an Early Śaiva Tantra.
- 2019: "Yoginī", Encyclopedia of Indian Religions, Hinduism and Tribal Religions.
- 2019: "Sisters and Consorts, Adepts and Goddesses: Representations of Women in the Brahmayāmala", Tantric Communities in Context.
- 2019: "The Lotus Garland (padmamālā) and Cord of Power (śaktitantu): The Brahmayāmala’s Integration of Inner and Outer Ritual".
- 2019: "The Brahmayāmalatantra and Early Śaiva Cult of Yoginīs".
- 2020: Śaivism and the Tantric Traditions Essays in Honour of Alexis G.J.S. Sanderson, edited by Dominic Goodall, Shaman Hatley, Harunaga Isaacson, and Srilata Raman. Brill.
- 2020: "Tantra" (Overview), Encyclopedia of Indian Religions. Hinduism and Tribal Religions.
- 2025 "The Wheel of the Navel and Lotus of the Heart"
