= Pretakshi Devi =

Yogini among the 64 Yoginis in Tantric Hinduism

Pretakshi (Pretākṣī)
- Spirits
- Member of The sixty-four Yoginīs
- Venerated in: Tantric traditions
- Associate: Kṣetrapāla (as subordinate)
- Gender: Female
- Region: Regional Indian traditions
- Temples: Chausath Yogini Temples

Pretākṣī (lang-sa|प्रेताक्षी, Pretākṣī) is one of the sixty-four Yoginis in the Shakta-Tantric tradition of Hinduism. The name is a compound of preta ("departed spirit" or "ghost") and akṣī ("eye"), commonly interpreted as "She whose eyes are on the spirits" or "She who oversees the departed". She belongs to the circle of fierce, esoteric goddesses associated with cremation grounds, protection from malevolent spirits, and the acquisition of supernatural powers.

== Scriptural and textual mentions ==
Pretākṣī appears primarily in lists of the Catuḥṣaṣṭi Yoginī (sixty-four Yoginis) found in Tantric texts and some Jain manuscripts. She is enumerated as the fifth Yogini in the Chausatha Yogini Namavali. In Jain sources she is described as a subordinate attendant of the guardian deity Kṣetrapāla. No detailed narrative or independent chapter about her exists in the major Puranas; her presence is confined to specialised Yogini lists and Tantric compendia.

== Iconography ==
Detailed canonical iconography for Pretākṣī alone is not widely recorded. As one of the sixty-four Yoginis, she is typically depicted in the open-air circular temples (e.g., Chausath Yogini Temple, Hirapur or Bhedaghat) with a distinctive posture, mount (vāhana), and set of emblems. Given her name's association with preta, scholars suggest her imagery may include cremation-ground attributes such as a skull cup (kapāla), severed head, or fierce expression, similar to other Yoginis linked to the śmaśāna (cremation ground).

== Associated shrines ==
Pretākṣī has no known independent major temple. She is represented as one of the sixty-four sculpted Yoginis in the surviving Chausath Yogini temples of central and eastern India (notably Hirapur in Odisha, Bhedaghat in Madhya Pradesh, and the ruined temples at Khajuraho and Ranipur-Jharial).

== Relation to other deities ==
Pretākṣī is regarded as a manifestation of the supreme Shakti and belongs to the broader circle of fierce goddesses such as Kali and the Matrikas. Her connection with spirits places her functionally alongside Yoginis and deities who govern the dead and protect against ghostly affliction.

== Folk and regional traditions ==
The Yogini tradition itself is widely understood as a Sanskritised incorporation of powerful local and tribal female spirits. Pretākṣī's name strongly suggests an original folk role as a protector against ghosts and malevolent spirits, a function still attributed to many village guardian goddesses (grāmadevatā) across India.

== Academic views ==
Scholars view the sixty-four Yoginis, including Pretākṣī, as evidence of the medieval Tantric assimilation of regional shamanic and folk goddesses into the Brahmanical-Shakta pantheon. Her specific association with preta underscores the Tantric interest in cremation-ground practices and the control of spirits for the attainment of supernatural powers (siddhi).
