= Chausath Yogini Temple, Bhedaghat =

Hindu temple in Madhya Pradesh, India

Coordinates: 23.1297°N 79.8013°E

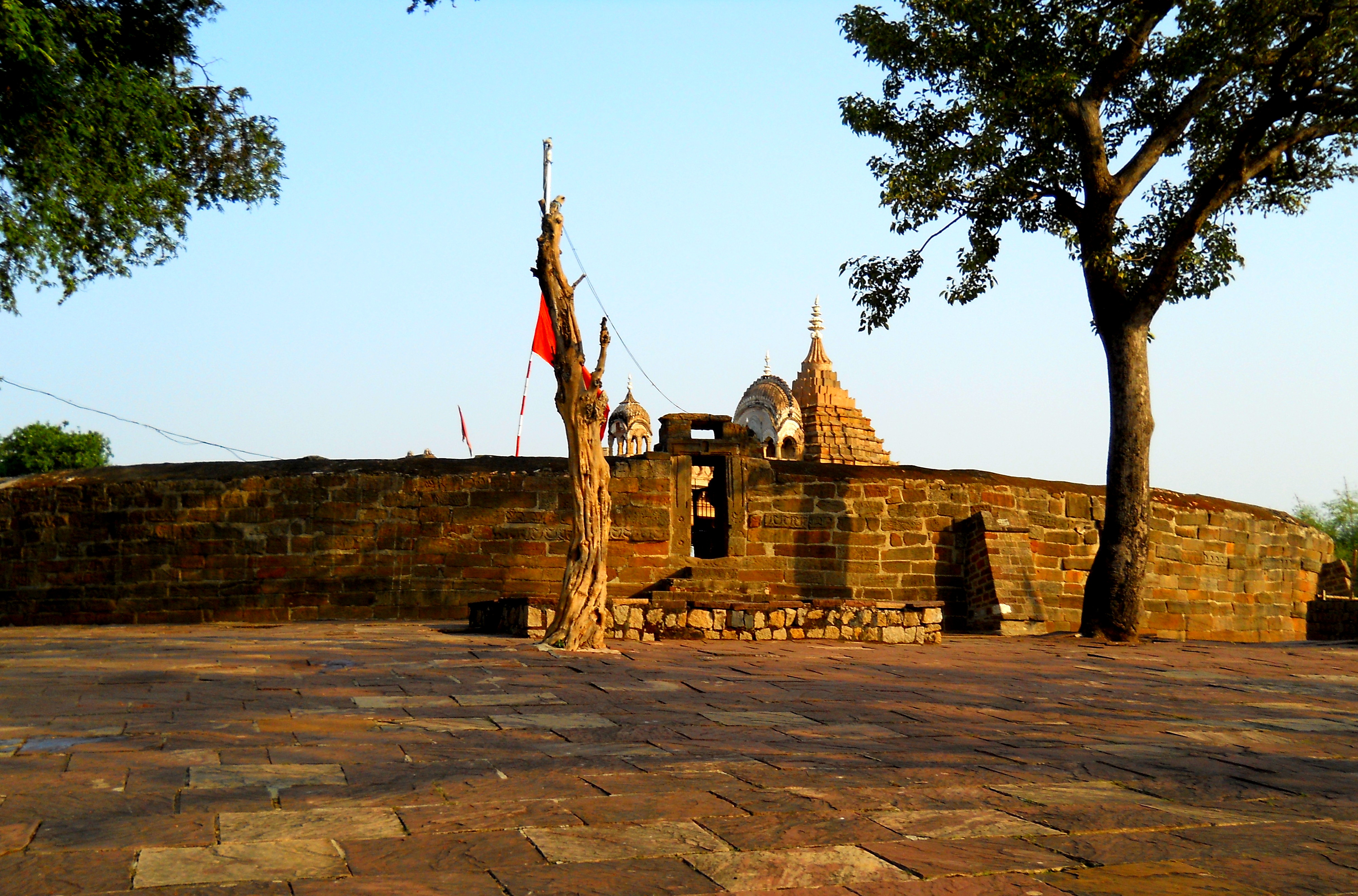
Exterior of the Yogini temple at Bhedaghat, showing the raised plinth and circular perimeter, with part of the central shrine in the background

The Chausath Yogini Temple, Bhedaghat, also called the Golaki Math ("circular lodge"), is one of India's yogini temples, but exceptionally it has shrines for 81 rather than the usual 64 yoginis. All the same, scholars include it among the 64-yogini temples (चौंसठ chausath meaning 64 in Hindi). The group of 81 (ekashi in Hindi) is a mark of royalty, implying that the temple was founded by a king. The large temple is on a hilltop above the river Narmada in Bhedaghat (Hindi भेड़ाघाट, also transliterated Bheraghat), some 5 km from Jabalpur, Madhya Pradesh.

== Temple ==
The temple is the largest of the circular yogini temples, some 125 feet in diameter. The scholar Shaman Hatley calls it the "most imposing and perhaps best known of the yogini temples". It has a covered walkway with 81 cells for yoginis around the inside of its circular wall; three niches, two to the west, and one to the southeast remain open as entrances. There is a later shrine in the centre of the courtyard; the temple was adapted as a Gauri-Shankar temple with the construction of the building in the south-centre of the circle in 1155 CE, at which time the central deities (Bhairava or dancing Shiva) were moved. The temple was built early in the 11th century CE by King Yuvaraja II, of the dynasty of the Kalachuris of Tripuri; he lived around 975–1025 CE. The city of Tripuri was four miles away, just across the Narmada river from the temple. According to the scholar David Gordon White, the temple would have been the Kalachuri dynasty's largest building project. The town's name was formerly Bhairavaghat; yogini temples held an image of either Shiva or Bhairava at their centre.

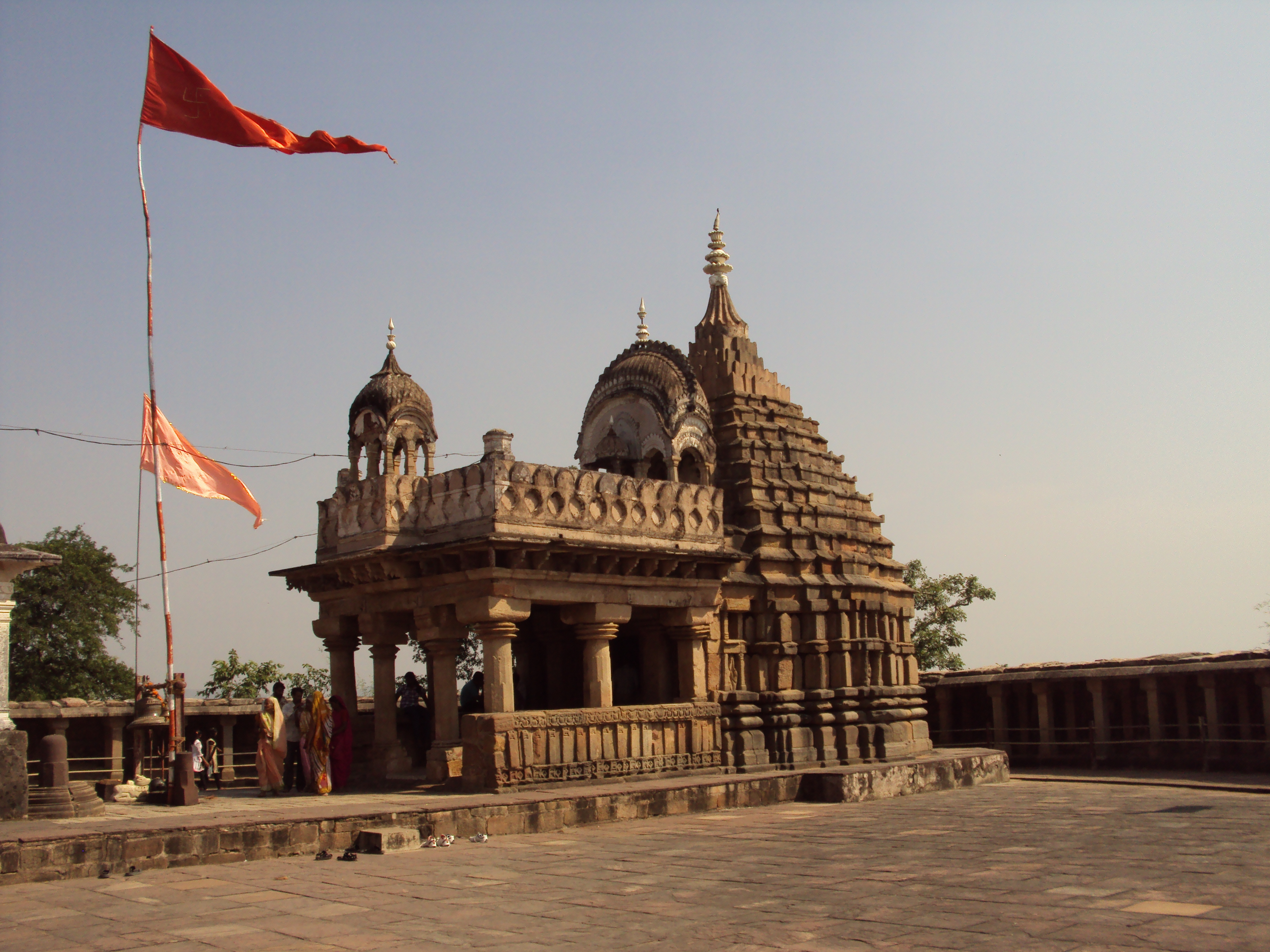
Inside the Yogini temple; the central shrine with shikhara is of later date.

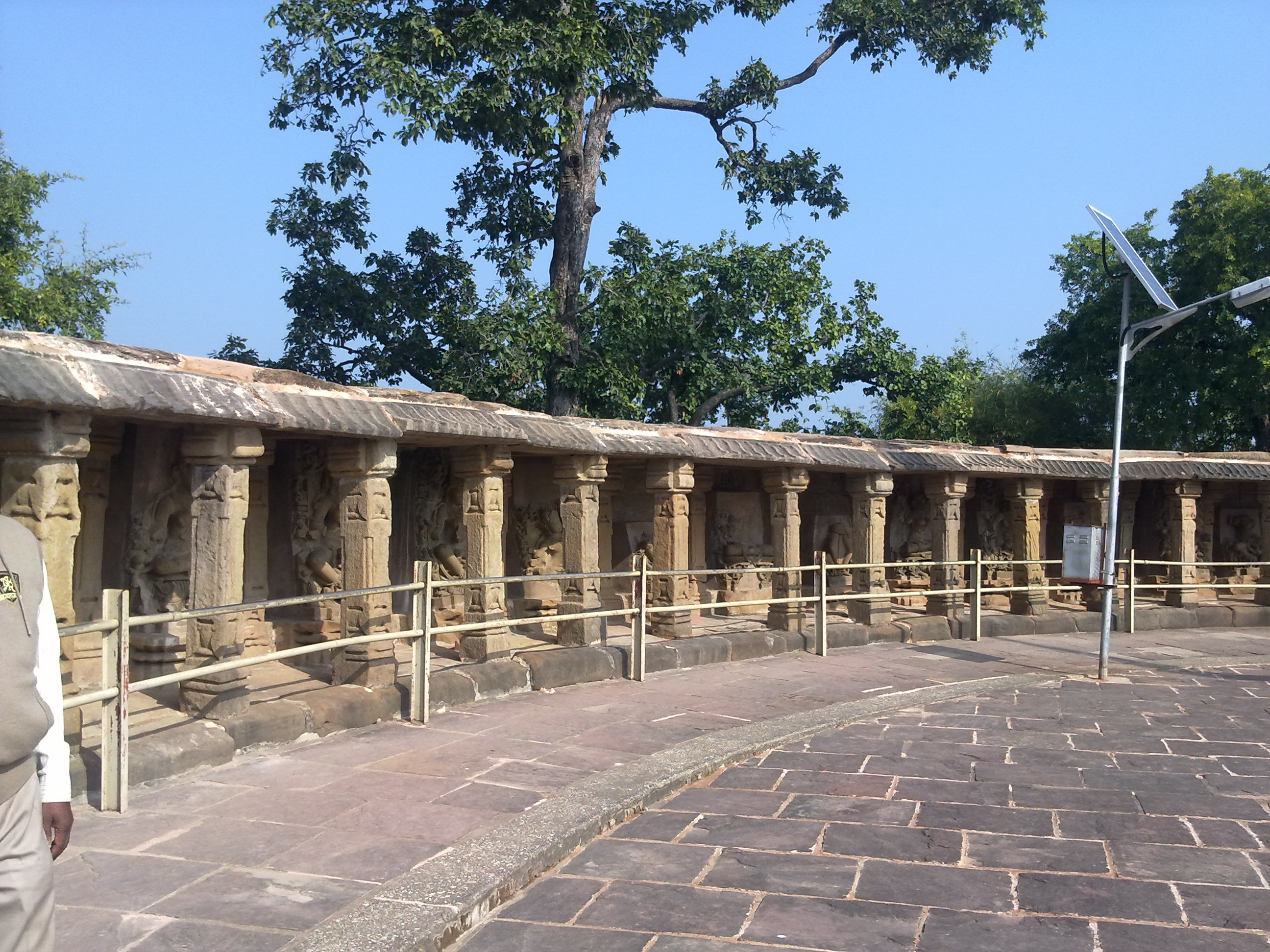
The circular wall has niches for 81 yoginis.

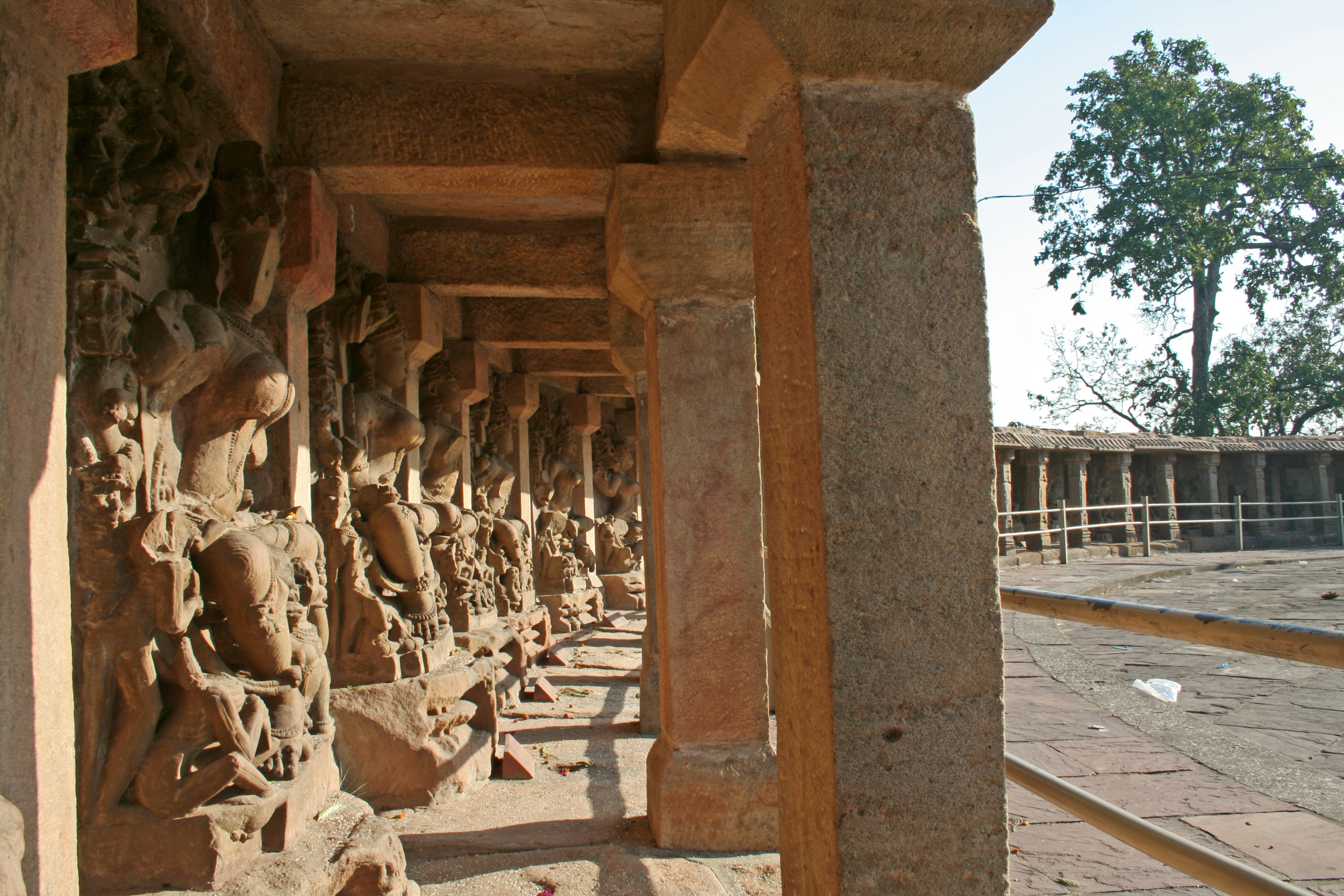
Yogini images inside the perimeter wall and walkway

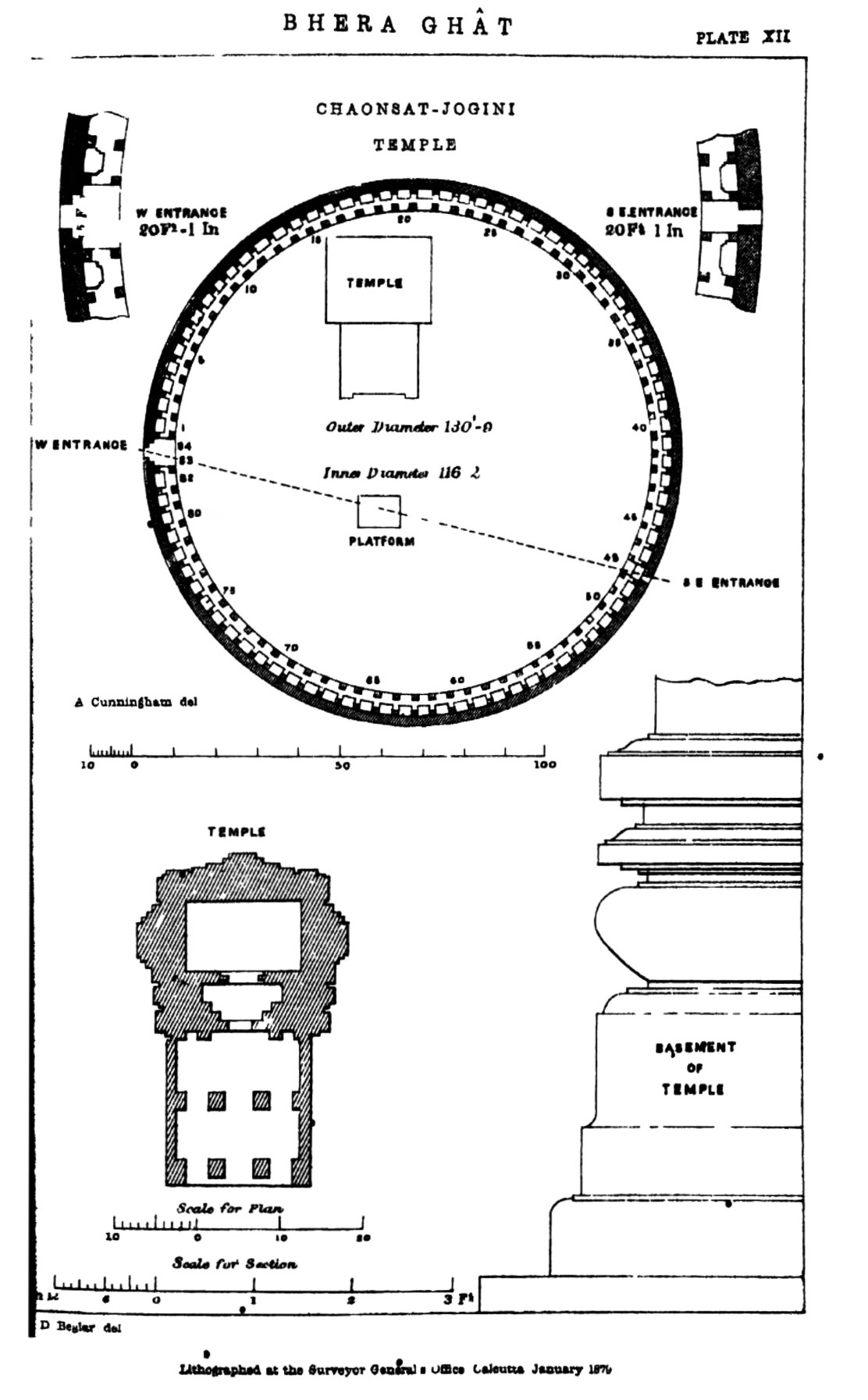
Plan, giving the outer diameter as 130 feet

== Yogini images ==
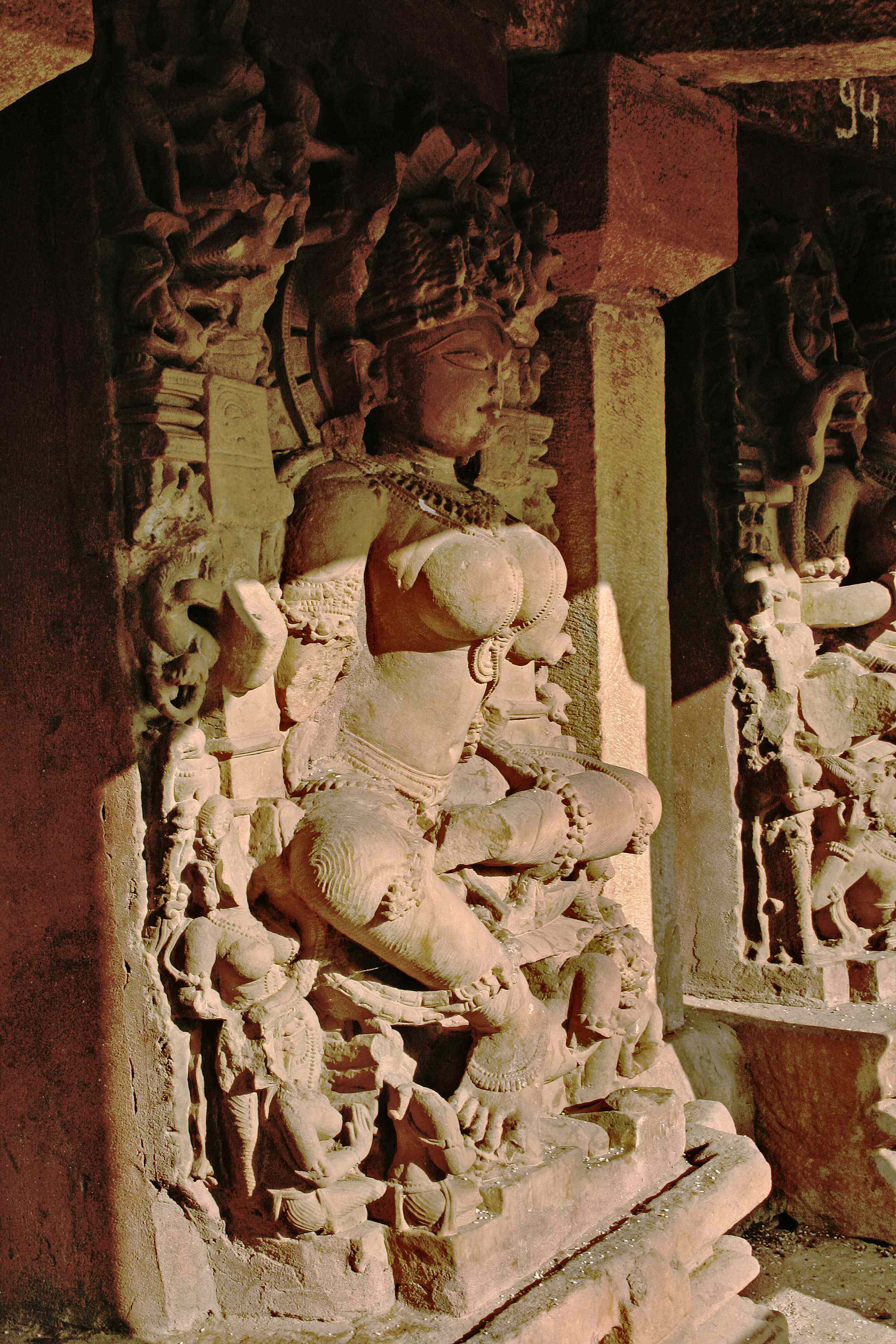
A yogini

The temple contains stone images of the yoginis; among them are Kamada ("Giver of Sexual Love"), whose image includes a yonipuja, worship of the yoni. The 81 images include 8 Matrikas, Mother goddesses, from an earlier time; one of them is Chandika, who is depicted riding a human corpse in a cremation ground. Three niches are now occupied by male gods, namely a dancing Ganesh and two Shivad, most likely from the central shrine as originally constructed. The yogini images that once occupied those niches have been lost, like many of the surviving but badly damaged yogini images heavily vandalised. Most of the images have had their faces broken; some survive only from the waist down. One image, that of the horse-faced yogini Erudi, survives in perfect condition.

The scholar of Indian and South Asian art Vidya Dehejia writes that the yoginis form a "statuesque seated group", rather over life-size; she describes them as "mature, voluptuous beauties, generously endowed with ample hips and heavy melon-like breasts". They are naked down to the waist, adorned with many earrings, necklaces, garlands, armlets, and bracelets. On their hips, they bear a "jewelled girdle" which supports a flimsy ankle-length skirt. Each has a halo and from 4 to 18 arms, both attributes of divinity; their faces are dignified and majestic, unsmiling. The "regal presence" of the yoginis suggests to Dehejia that the yoginis are either acolytes or directly aspects of Devi, the Great Goddess. Both Kamada and Sarvatomukhi are names of Devi; the Sarvatomukhi image has three faces, with large teeth, bristling hair, a garland of skulls, and a terrifying aspect. Each yogini image is carved from a rectangular slab of stone with several smaller figures on the base, an ornate throne, and flying deities above. The slab's base contains a label chiselled into the stone; each slab stands on a stone pedestal. The smaller figures are mostly in scenes of cremation grounds, with what White calls "flesh-eating ghouls" along with scavenging jackals and birds. Human yoginis and their male counterparts, yogeshvaris, are depicted, but with few or no indications of sexual practices: there are some thin ithyphallic male figures. Many of the human yoginis are shown eating severed human limbs.

The 81 yoginis are described in the Mula Chakra of the Sri Matottara Tantra, which survives in manuscript form in Nepal. It tells of 9 Matrikas (not the usual 8); each is counted as a yogini, and leads a group of 8 other yoginis, so that there are 9 groups of 9. The inscriptions identify six of the Matrikas as Varahi, Brahmani, Maheshvari, Indrani, and Vaishnavi, along with Chandika who is not usually included as a Matrika but is named in the Mula Chakra. Dehejia suggests that two of the heavily damaged images may be of Chamunda and Mahalakshmi and that image of Kaumari found at another site, Mandla, looks as if it was one of the Bhedaghat yoginis.

== See also ==
- Chausath Yogini Temple, Hirapur
- Chausath Yogini Temple, Ranipur Jharial
- Chausath Yogini Temple, Mitaoli
- Chausath Yogini Temple, Khajuraho

== Sources ==
- Dehejia, Vidya (1986). "Bheraghat: A Temple of Eighty-one Yoginis". Yogini Cult and Temples: A Tantric Tradition. National Museum, New Delhi. pp. 125–140.
- Dupuis, Stella (2008). The Yoginī Temples of India : in the pursuit of a mystery, travel notes. Varanasi: Pilgrims Publishing. ISBN 978-81-7769-665-3. OCLC 298129207.
- Hatley, Shaman (2007). The Brahmayāmalatantra and Early Śaiva Cult of Yoginīs. University of Pennsylvania (PhD Thesis, UMI Number: 3292099). pp. 1–459. Archived from the original on 23 July 2010.
- Hatley, Shaman (2014). "11: Goddesses in Text and Stone : Temples of the Yoginis in Light of Tantric and Puranic Literature". In Benjamin Fleming; Richard Mann (eds.). Material Culture and Asian Religions: Text, Image, Object. Routledge. pp. 195–226. ISBN 978-1138546141.
- Roy, Anamika (2015). Sixty-four Yoginis : cult, icons and goddesses. Delhi: Primus Books. ISBN 978-93-84082-12-3. OCLC 919909942.
- White, David Gordon (2006) [2003]. Kiss of the Yogini: 'Tantric Sex' in its South Asian Contexts. University of Chicago Press. ISBN 978-0226894843.
