= Trajan's Kiosk =

Ancient building on Philae, Egypt

Coordinates: 24.0251°N 32.8846°E

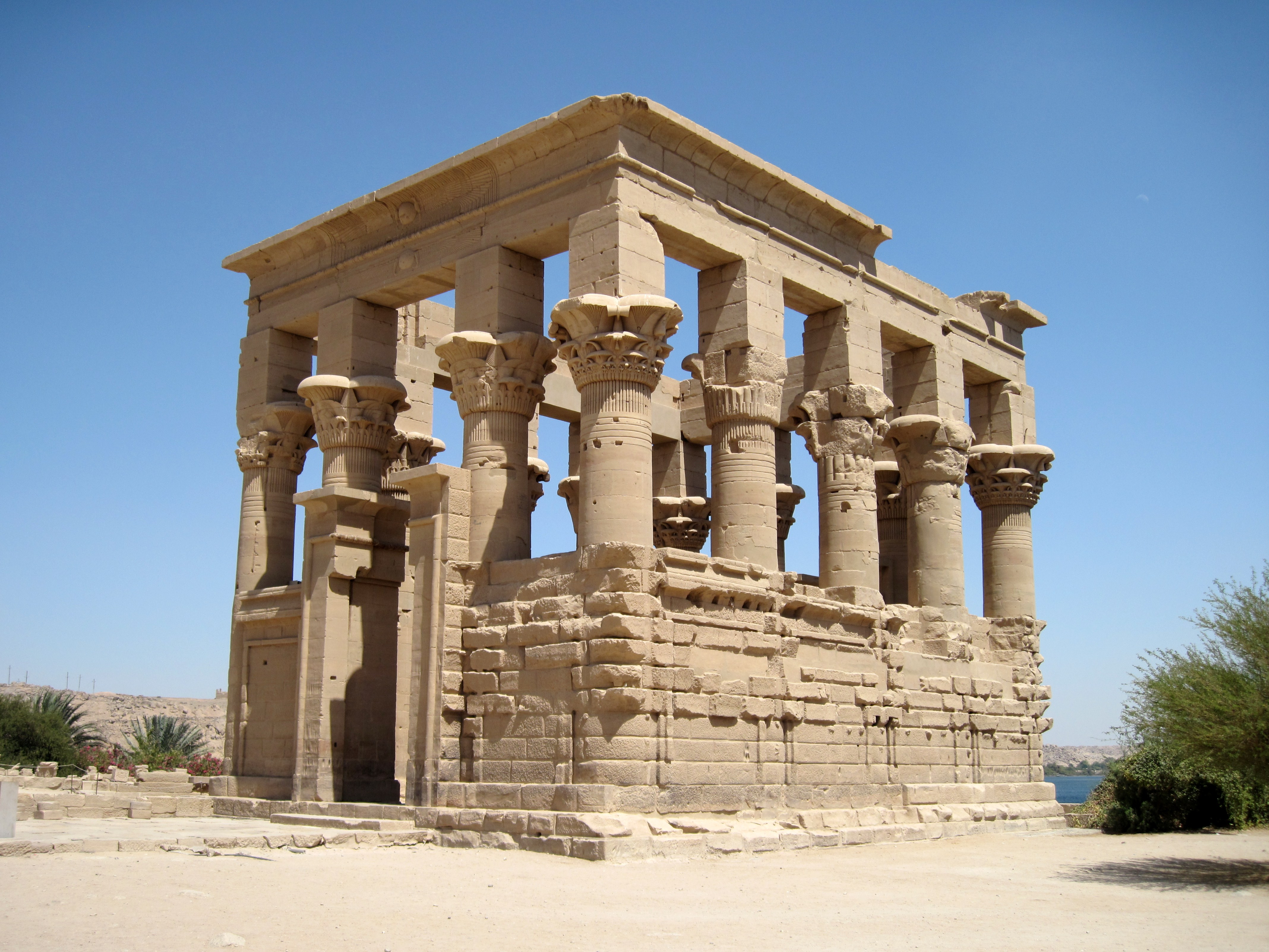
Trajan's Kiosk on Agilika island

Trajan's Kiosk, also known as Pharaoh's Bed (Arabic: سرير فرعون) by the locals, is a hypaethral temple currently located on Agilkia Island in southern Egypt. The unfinished monument is attributed to Trajan, Roman emperor from 98 to 117 AD, due to his depiction as pharaoh seen on some of the interior reliefs. However, the majority of the structure dates to an earlier time, possibly to the reign of Augustus. The temple was originally built on the island of Philae, near the lower Aswan Dam, and served as main entrance to the Philae Island Temple Complex from the Nile river. It was relocated to Agilika Island in the 1960s as part of the International Campaign to Save the Monuments of Nubia to save it from the rising waters of the Nile that followed the construction of the Aswan High Dam.

This 15-x-20 metre kiosk is 15.85 metres high; its function was likely "to shelter the bark of Isis at the eastern banks" of Philae island. Its four by five columns each carry "different, lavishly structured composite capitals that are topped by 2.10-metre-high piers" and were originally intended to be sculpted into Bes piers, similar to the birthhouses of Philae, Armant, and Dendera though this decoration was never completed.

The structure is today roofless, but sockets within the structure's architraves suggest that its roof, which was made of timber, was indeed constructed in ancient times. Three 12.50-metre-long, presumably triangulated trusses, "which were inserted into a ledge at the back of stone architecture, carried the slightly vaulted roof." All the fourteen columns are connected by a screening wall, with entrances in the eastern and western facades. This building represents an example of the unusual combination of wood and stone in the same architectural structure for an Egyptian temple. The attribution to Emperor Trajan is based on a carving inside the kiosk structure, depicting the emperor burning incense before Osiris and Isis.

== Gallery ==
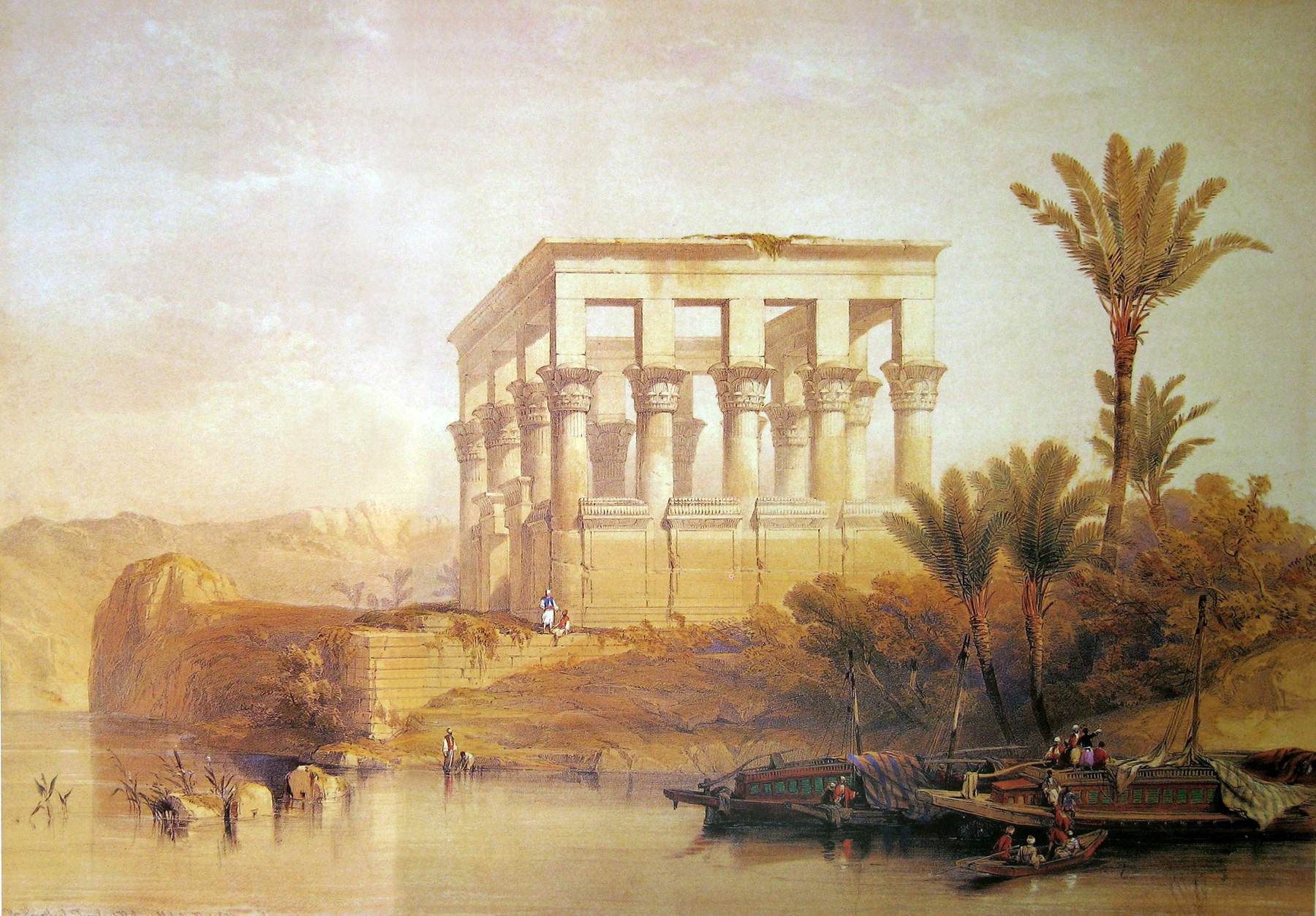
The Hypaethral Temple of Philae by David Roberts, 1838, in The Holy Land, Syria, Idumea, Arabia, Egypt, and Nubia

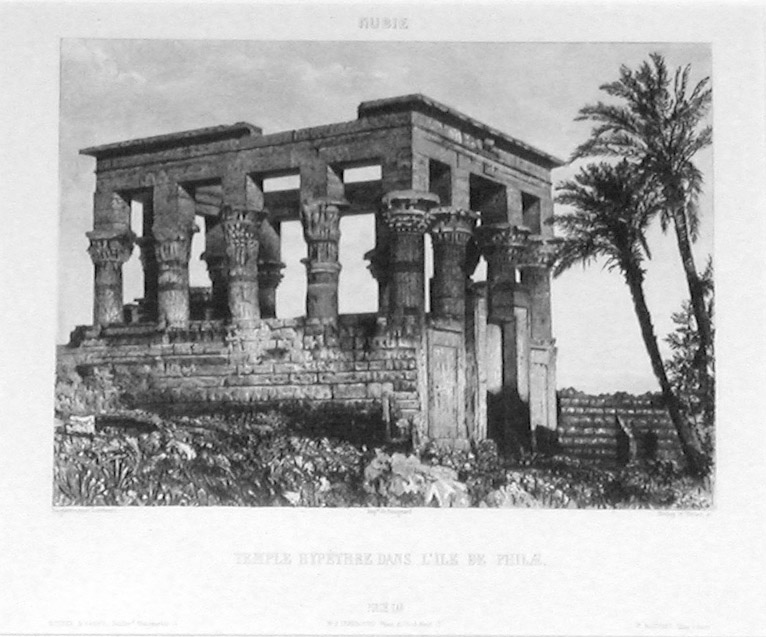
Kiosk in December, 1839, Pierre-Gustave Joly de Lotbinière

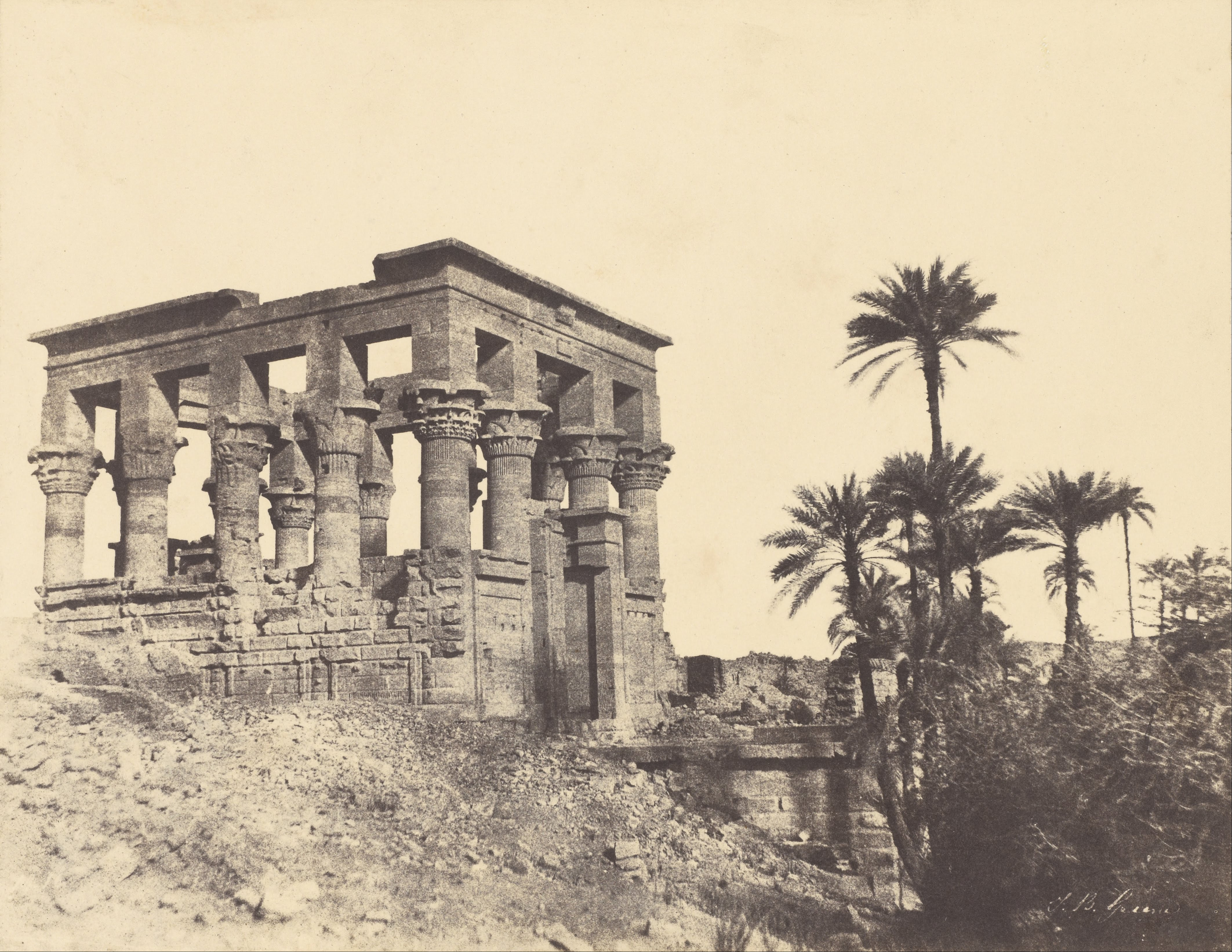
Kiosk in 1854 by John Beasley Greene

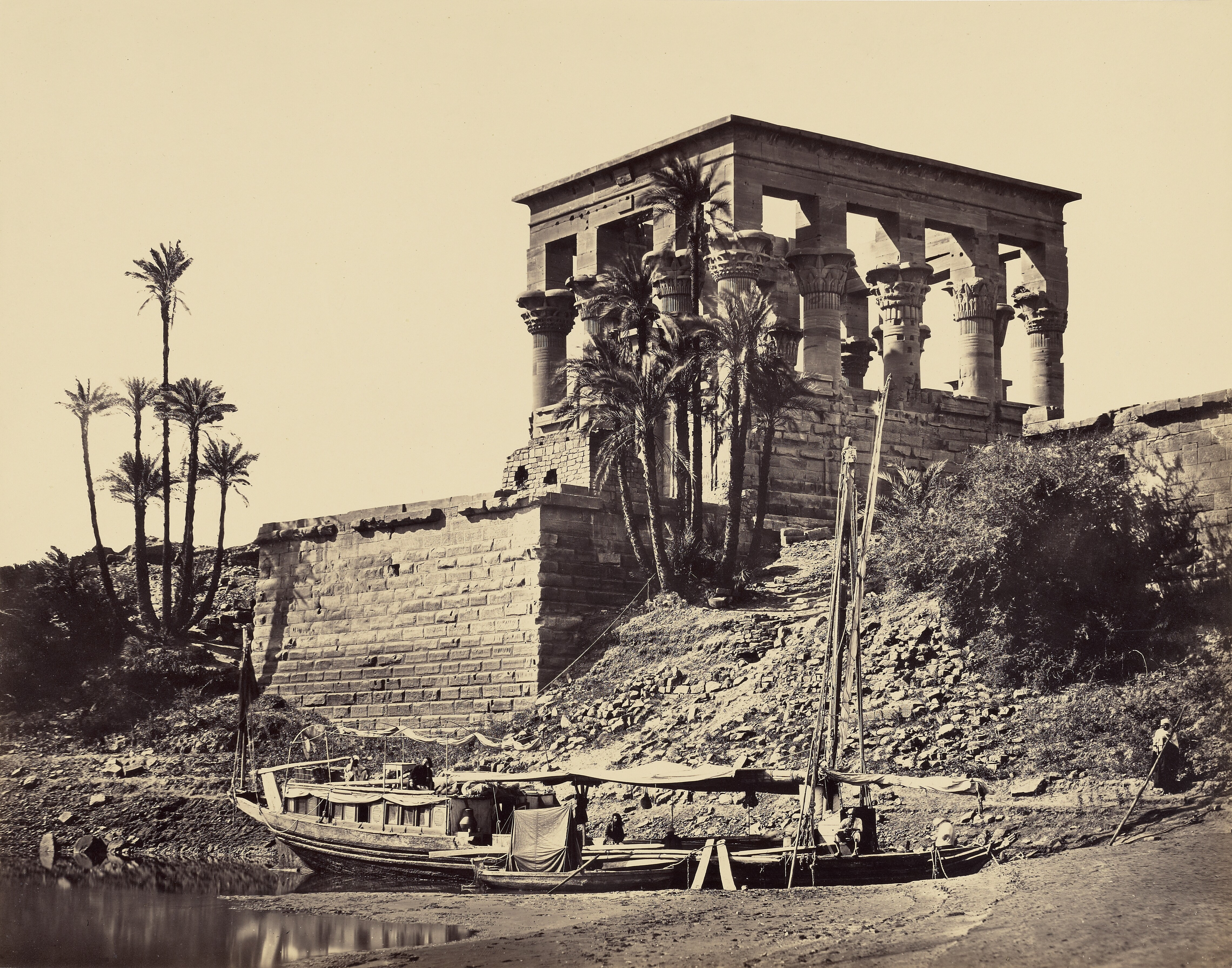
The Hypaethral Temple, Philae, by Francis Frith, 1857; from the collection of the National Galleries of Scotland
