= Hypaethral =

Ancient temple with no roof

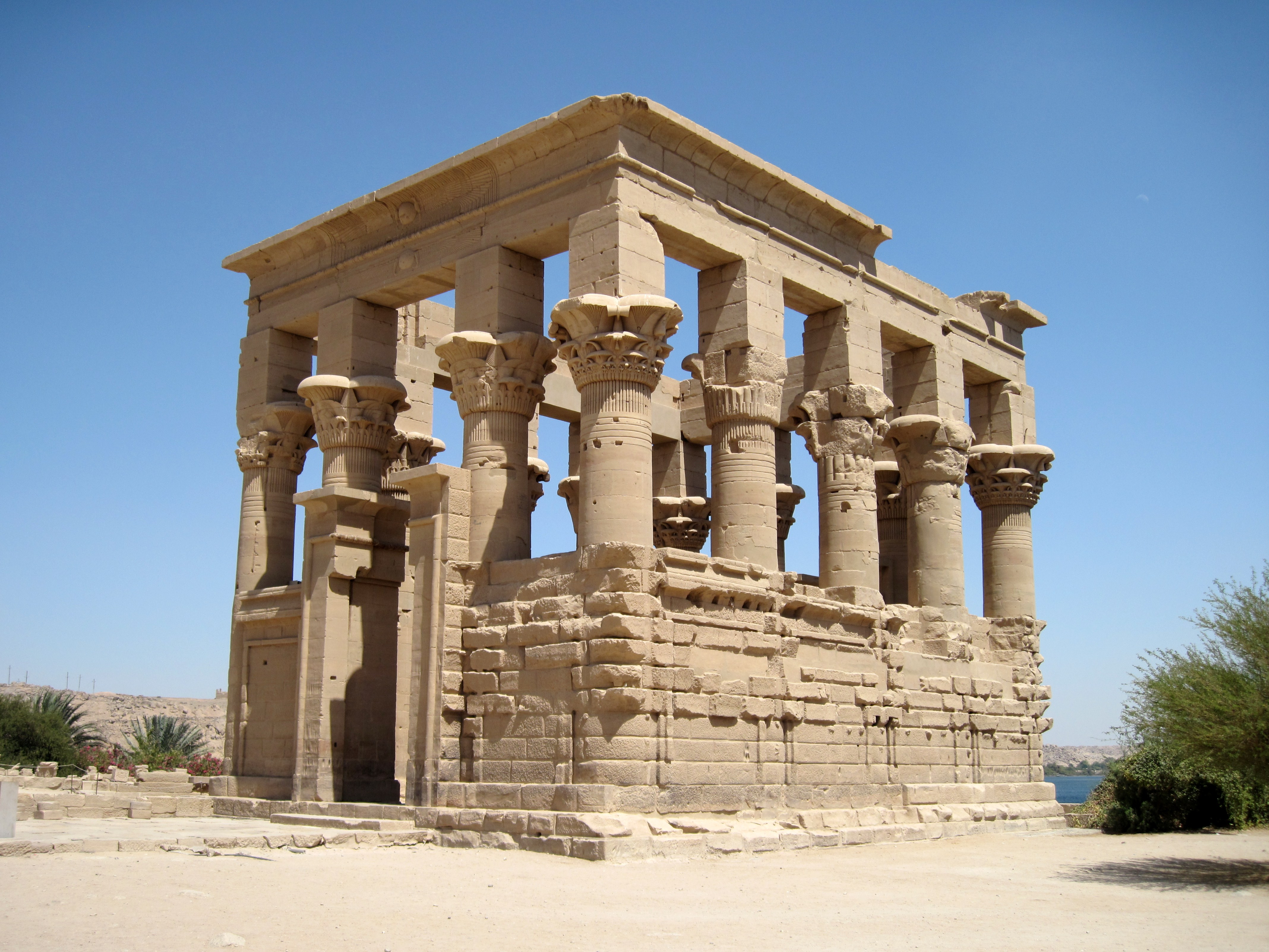
Trajan's Kiosk on Agilkia Island

In classical architecture, hypaethral describes a building with no roof and with columns forming a partial wall.

The term originates from Latin hypaethrus, from Ancient Greek ὕπαιθρος hupaithros ὑπό hupo- "under" and αἰθήρ aither "sky, air". It was described by the Roman architect Vitruvius in his treatise De architectura, written for the emperor Caesar Augustus probably about 15 BC.

== Overview ==
Hypaethral is in contradistinction to cleithral, a term applied to a covered temple. The hypaethros or hypaethral opening is the term Vitruvius (iii. 2) used for the opening in the middle of the roof of temples, an example being found in Athens in the temple of Jupiter Olympius, which is octastyle. There was no example in Rome.

However, at the time Vitruvius wrote (c. 25 AD) the cella of this temple was unroofed, because the columns which had been provided to carry, at all events, part of the ceiling and roof had been taken away by Sulla in 80 BC. The decastyle temple of Apollo Didymaeus near Miletus was, according to Strabo (c. 50 BC), unroofed, on account of the vastness of its cella, in which precious groves of laurel bushes were planted.

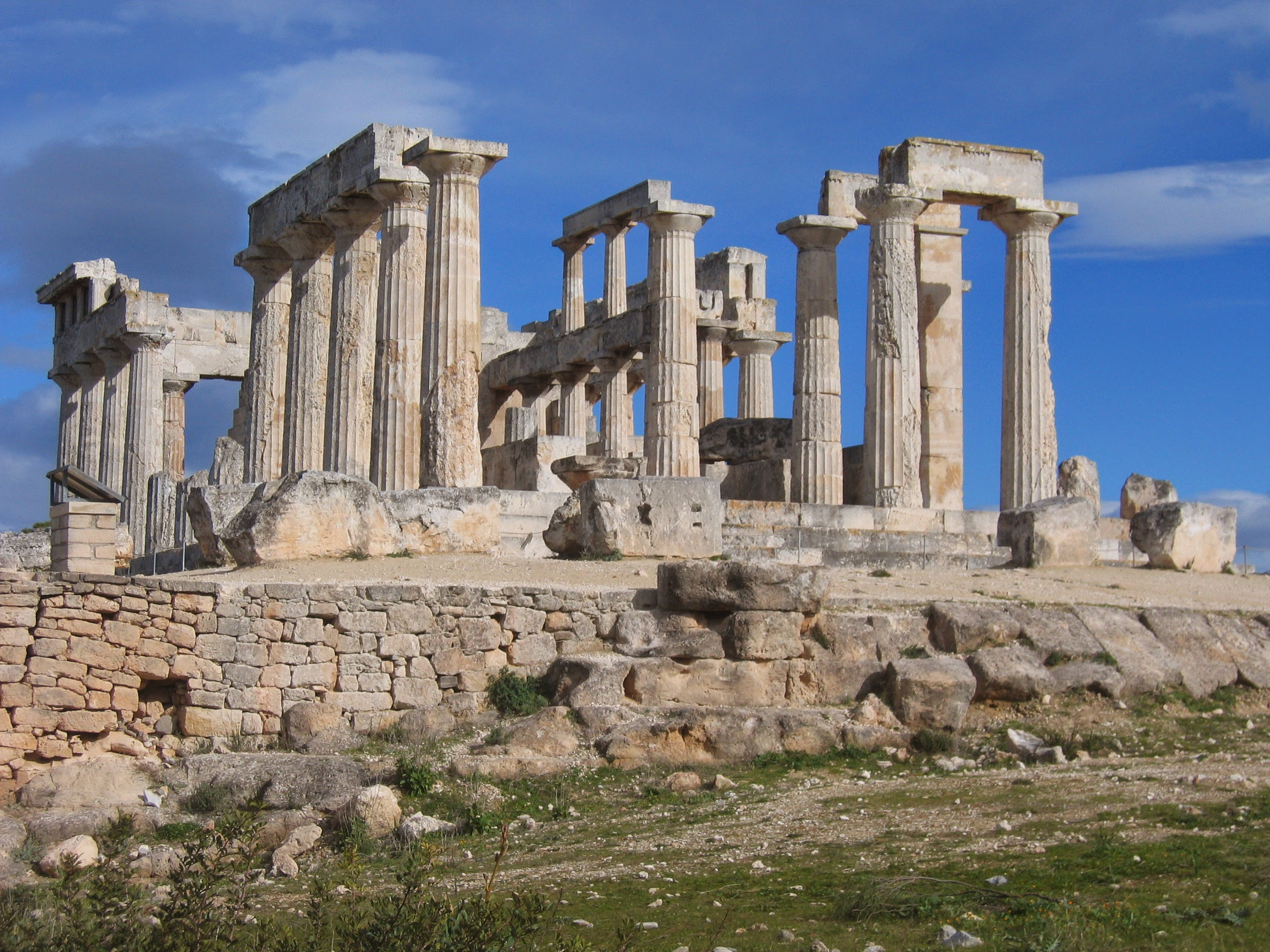
The Temple of Aphaea on the Greek island of Aegina

Apart from these two examples, the references in various writers to an opening of some kind in the roofs of temples dedicated to particular deities, and the statement of Vitruvius, which was doubtless based on the writings of Greek authors, that in decastyle or large temples the centre was open to the sky and without a roof (medium autem sub diva est sine tecto), render the existence of the hypaethros probable in some cases; and therefore C. R. Cockerell's discovery in the temple at Aegina of two fragments of a coping-stone, in which there were sinkings on one side to receive the tiles and covering tiles, has been of great importance in the discussion of this subject. In the conjectural restoration of the opaion or opening in the roof shown in Cockerell's drawing, it has been made needlessly large, having an area of about one quarter of the superficial area of the cella between the columns, and since in the Pantheon at Rome the relative proportions of the central opening in the dome and the area of the rotunda are 1:22, and the light there is ample, in the clearer atmosphere of Greece it might have been less. The larger the opening, the more conspicuous would be the notch in the roof which is so greatly objected to; in this respect, Jacques Hittorf would seem to be nearer the truth when, in his conjectural restoration of Temple R at Selinus, he shows an opaion about half the relative size shown in Cockerell's of that at Aegina, the coping on the side elevation being much less noticeable.

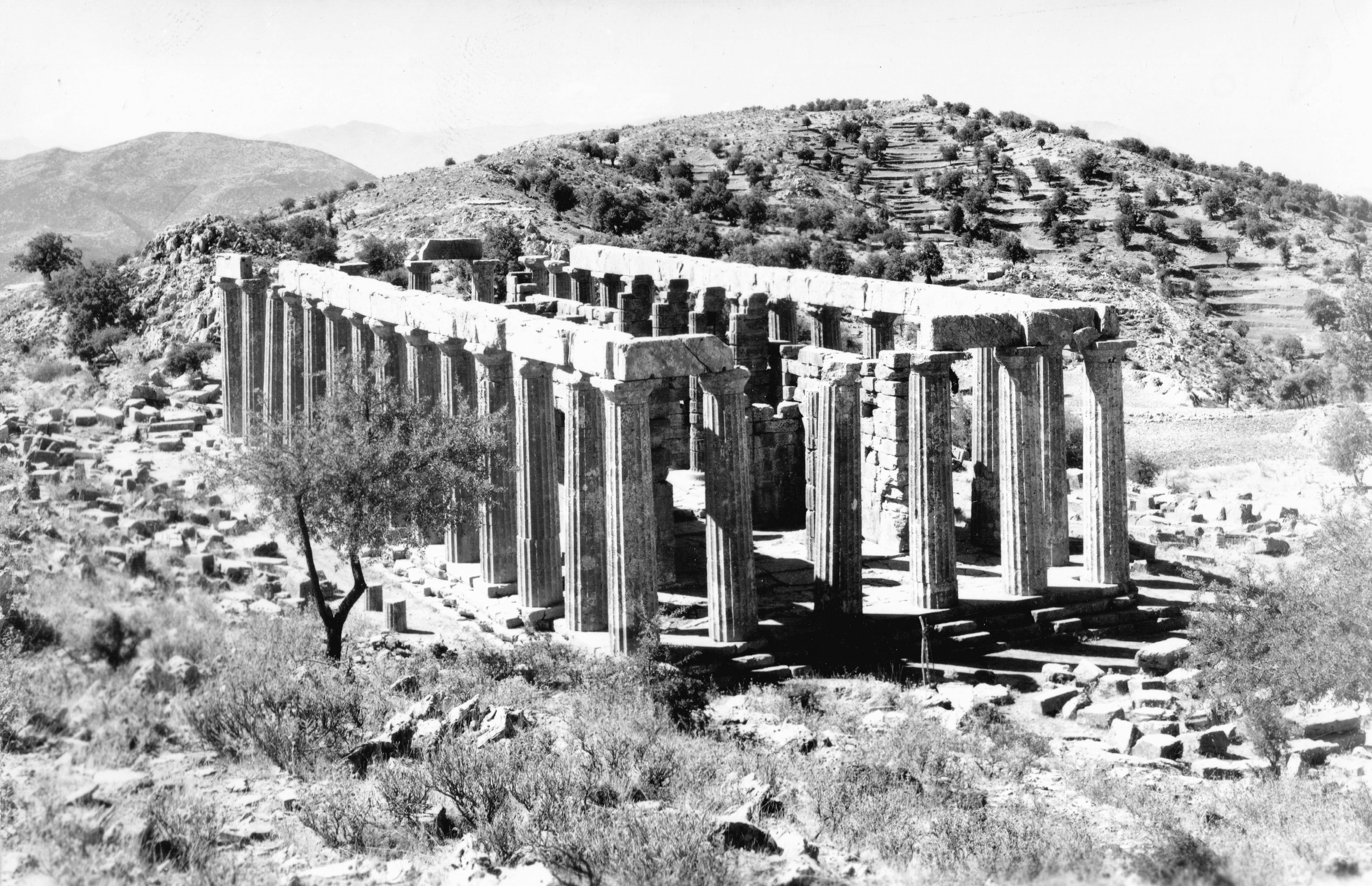
Temple of Apollo Epikourios at Bassae (Greece)

The problem was apparently solved in another way at Bassae, where, in the excavations of the temple of Apollo by Cockerell and Baron Hailer von Hallerstein, three marble tiles were found with pierced openings in them about 18 inches by 10 in.; five of these pierced tiles on either side would have amply lighted the interior of the cella, and the amount of rain passing through (a serious element to be considered in a country where torrential rains occasionally fall) would not be very great or more than could be retained to dry up in the cella sunk pavement. In favor of both these methods of lighting, the interior of the cella, the sarcophagus tomb at Cyrene, about 20 feet (6.1 m) long, carved in imitation of a temple, has been adduced, because, on the tor of the roof and in its centre, there is a raised coping, and a similar feature is found on a tomb found near Delos; an example from Crete now in the British Museum shows a pierced tile on each side of the roof, and a large number of pierced tiles have been found in Pompeii, some of them surrounded with a rim identical with that of the marble tiles at Bassae.

On the other hand, there are many authorities, among them Wilhelm Dörpfeld, who have adhered to their original opinion that it was only through the open doorway that light was ever admitted into the cella, and with the clear atmosphere of Greece and the reflections from the marble pavement, such lighting would be quite sufficient. There remains still another source of light to be considered, that passing through the Parian marble tiles of the roof; the superior translucency of Parian to any other marble may have suggested its employment for the roofs of temples, and if, in the framed ceilings carried over the cella, openings were left, some light from the Parian tile roof might have been obtained. It is possibly to this that Plutarch refers when describing the ceiling and roof of the temple of Demeter at Eleusis, where the columns in the interior of the temple carried a ceiling, probably constructed of timbers crossing one another at right angles, and one or more of the spaces was left open, which Xenocles surmounted by a roof formed of tiles.

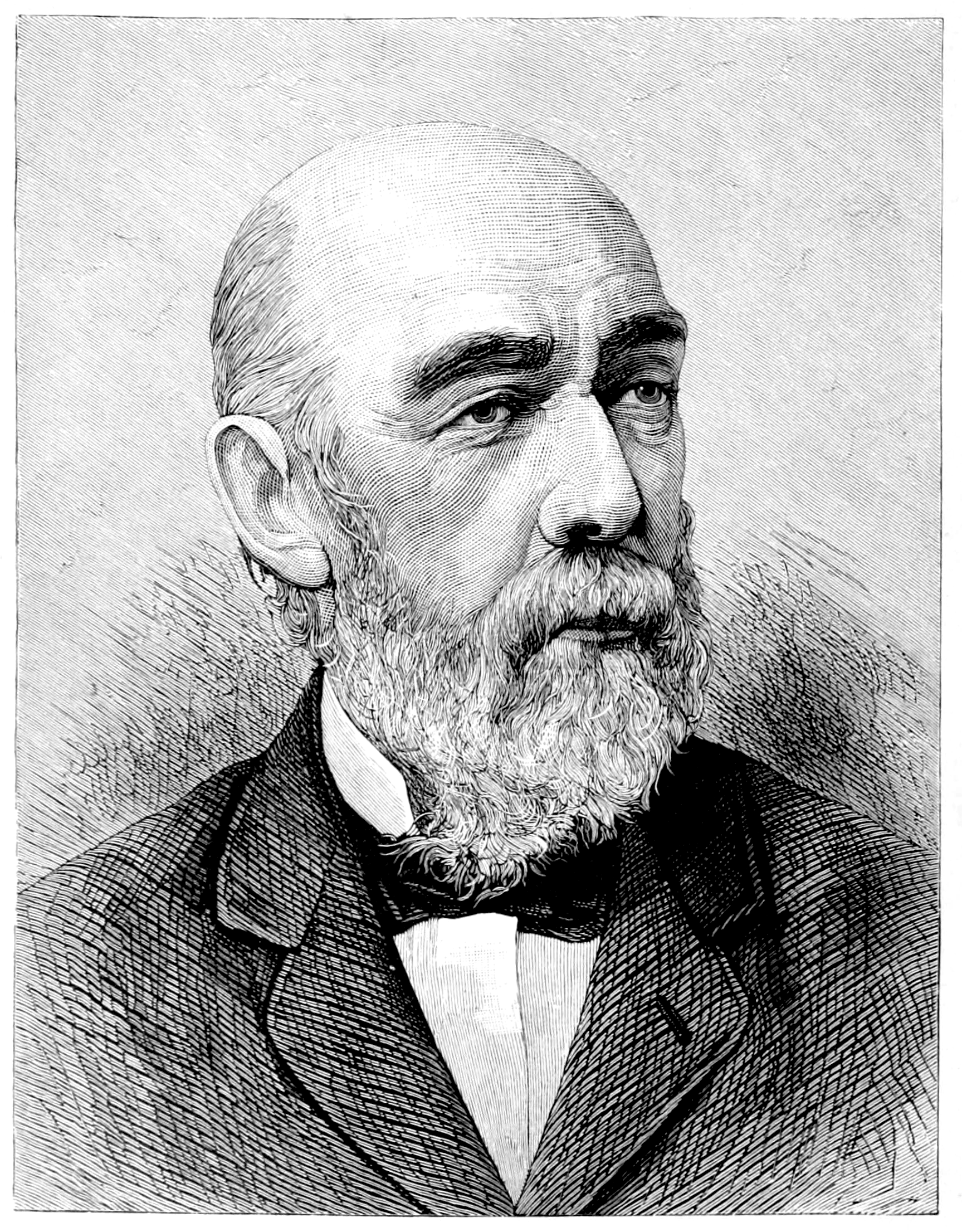
James Fergusson

In his 1849 Historical Inquiry into the True Principles of Beauty in Art: More Especially with Reference to Architecture, the architect James Fergusson put forward a conjectural restoration in which he adopted a clerestory above the superimposed columns inside the cella; in order to provide the light for these windows, he indicated two trenches in the roof, one on each side, and pointed out that the great Hall of Columns at Karnak was lighted in this way with clerestory windows; but in the first place the light in the latter was obtained over the flat roofs covering lower portions of the hail, and in the second place, as it rarely rains in Egyptian Thebes, there could be no difficulty about the drainage, while in Greece, with the torrential rains and snow, these trenches would be deluged with water, and with all the appliances of the present day it would be impossible to keep these clerestory windows watertight. There is, however, still another objection to Fergusson's theory: the water collecting in these trenches on the roof would have to be discharged, for which Fergusson's suggestions are quite inadequate, and the gargoyles shown in the celia wall would make the peristyle insupportable just at the time when it was required for shelter.

No drainage otherwise of any kind has ever been found in any Greek temple, which is fatal to Fergusson's view. Nor is it in accordance with the definition open to the sky. English cathedrals and churches are all lighted by clerestory windows, but no one has described them as open to the sky, and although Vitruvius's statements are sometimes confusing, his description is far too clear to leave any misunderstanding as to the lighting of temples (where it was necessary on account of great length) through an opening in the roof.

There is one other theory that has been put forward, but which can only apply to non-peristylar temples, that light and air were admitted through the metopes, the apertures between the beams crossing the cella, and it has been assumed that because Orestes was advised in one of the Greek plays to climb up and look through the metopes of the temple, these were left open; but if Orestes could look in, so could the birds, and the statue of the god would be defiled. The metopes were probably filled in with shutters of some kind, which Orestes knew how to open.

== Examples ==
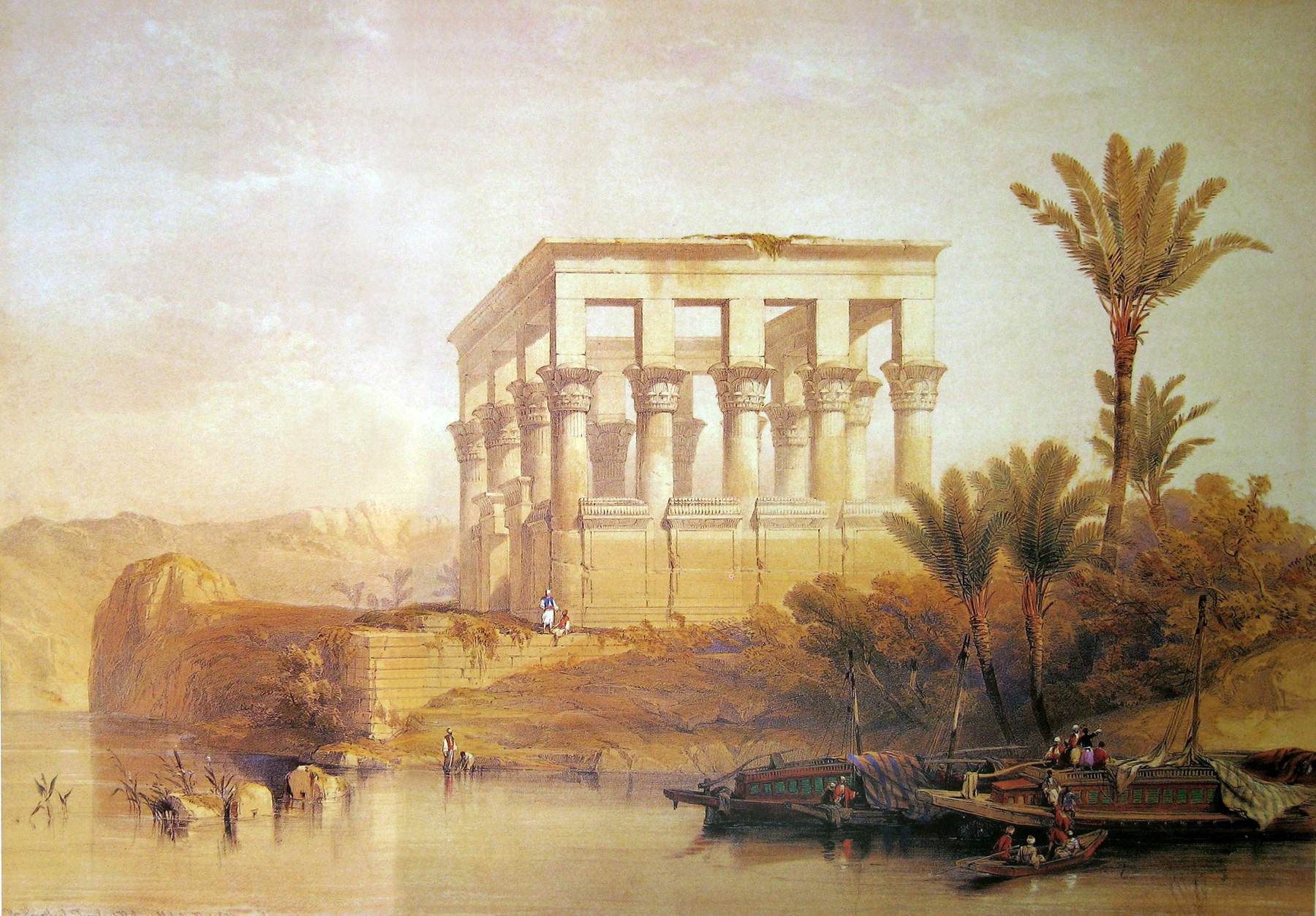
The Hypaethral Temple of Philae, a romantic depiction after David Roberts painted in 1838, published in The Holy Land, Syria, Idumea, Arabia, Egypt, and Nubia

- Trajan's Kiosk (shown above right) on the island of Philae near Aswan, Egypt; now located on Agilkia Island.
- Intraurban Sanctuary of Demeter and Persephone at Cyrene, Libya
- Temple of Apollo at Didyma, at Didim, Turkey
- Five rare hypaethral temples dedicated to 64 flying yoginis (often with bird mounts) in India:
  - Chausathi Jogini Temple, at Odisha
  - Ranipur-Jharial, also in Odisha
  - Hirapur near Bhubaneswar
  - Khajuraho and Bheraghat near Jabalpur
  - Dudhai near Lalitpur

== See also ==
- Oculus (architecture)
