= Chausath Yogini Temple, Hirapur =

Hindu temple in Odisha, India

Chausathi Yogini Temple
- Chausathi Yogini Mandir
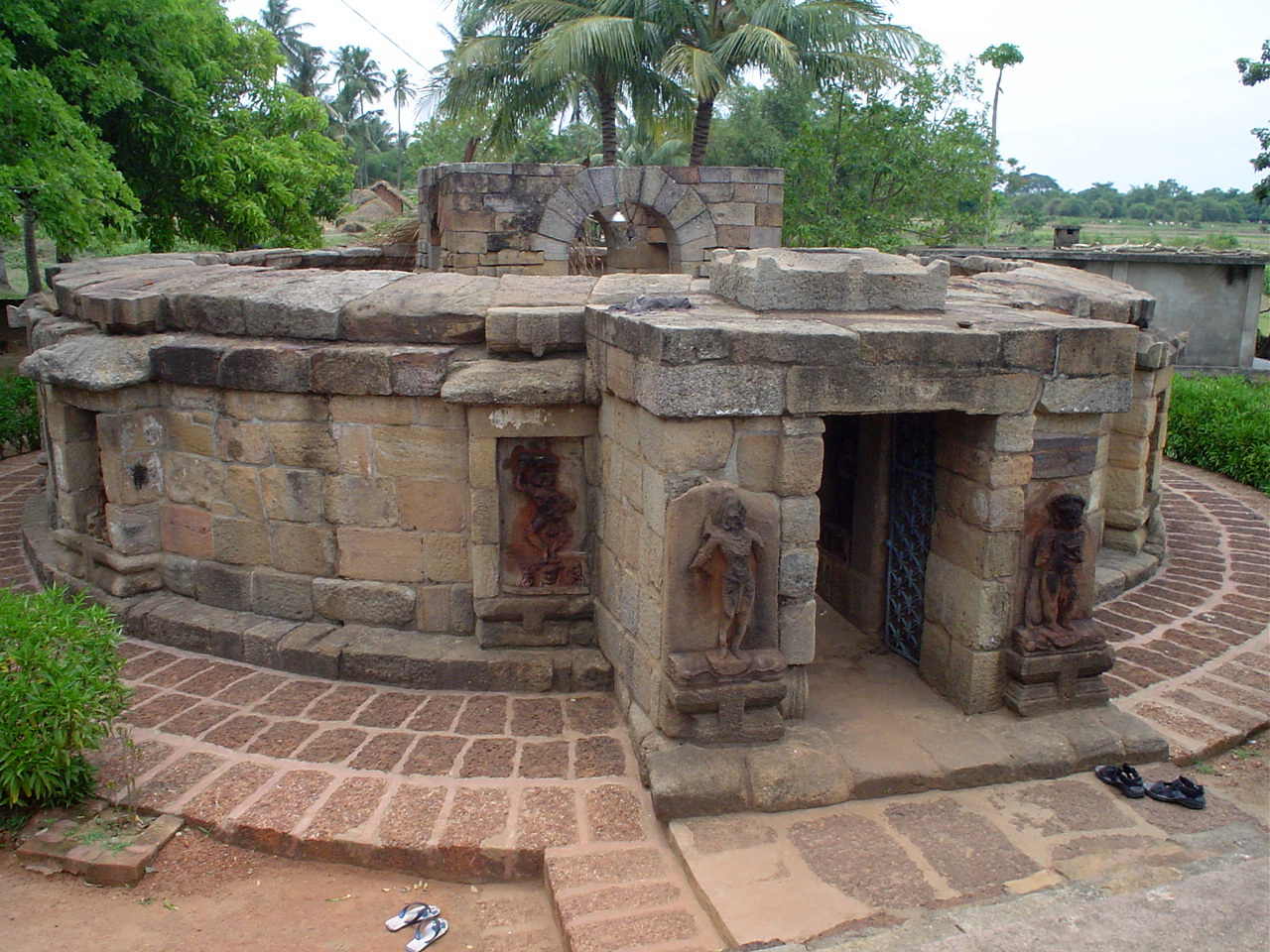

- Location within Odisha

Religion
- Affiliation: Hinduism
- District: Khurda
- Deity: Kali
- Festival: Kali Puja

Location
- Location: Hirapur
- State: Odisha
- Country: India
- Coordinates: 20°13′35.454″N 85°52′32.141″E

Architecture
- Type: Hypaethral

Specifications
- Temple: 2
- Monument: 3
- Elevation: 17 m (56 ft)

The Chausathi Yogini Temple (64-Yogini Temple) of Hirapur, also known as the Mahamaya Temple, is 20 km outside Bhubaneswar, the capital of Odisha state of Eastern India. It is devoted to the worship of the yoginis, auspicious goddess-like figures.

== Religious aspect ==
Hirapur's yogini temple is a tantric shrine, with hypaethral (roofless) architecture as tantric prayer rituals involve worshipping the bhumandala (environment consisting all the 5 elements of nature - fire, water, earth, air and ether), and the yoginis are believed to be capable of flight.

The yogini idols represent female figures standing on an animal, a demon or a human head depicting the victory of Shakti (Eternal power). According to Hindu mythology, aadishakti is the eternal power which came into existence on its own and then created everything by its will. Aadishakti (recognized as the goddess because of its motheristic character) is the supreme power. The idols express everything from rage, sadness, pleasure, joy, desire and happiness. The number 64 finds its reference in Hindu mythology in forms such as Kālá for time, Kalā for performing arts etc.

Such temples dedicated to yoginis, although rare, are also seen at Ranipur-Jharial site of the Balangir district in Odisha and seven other places in India.

== History ==
The temple is believed to have been built by the Bhouma dynasty queen of Lonabhadra alias Santikaradeva II, Hiradevi during 864 CE. It is the first Chausathi Yogini Temple of India.

The legend behind the temple, according to local priests, is that the Goddess Durga took the form of 64 demi-goddesses to defeat a demon. After the fight the 64 goddesses, equated with yoginis, asked Durga to commemorate them in the form of a temple structure.

The temple complex is now maintained by Archaeological Survey of India.

Kalapahad, a Muslim convert general of the 16th century CE, is said to have attacked this temple and broken the murtis. He is also known as the destroyer of Jaganath and Konark temples.

== Architecture ==
The temple is small and circular, only 25 feet (7.6 m) in diameter. It is hypaethral, and built of blocks of sandstone. The inside of the circular wall has niches, each housing the statue of a Goddess. 56 of the 64 idols, made of black stone, survive. They surround the main image at the centre of the temple, the Goddess Kali, who stands on a human head, representing the triumph of the heart over the mind. Some historians believe that an idol of Maha Bhairava was worshipped in the Chandi Mandapa. The temple seems to follow a mandala plan in a way that concentric circles are formed while a Shiva at the center inside the inner sanctum is roundly surrounded by four Yoginis and four Bhairavas.

The circle is reached via a protruding entrance passage, so that the plan of the temple has the form of a yoni-pedestal for a Shiva lingam.

The Yogini images depict standing goddesses and their animal vehicles (vahana). The Yoginis are naked but for their bejewelled girdles, from which hang flimsy skirts that can be made out as a light decoration on their legs; they are adorned with bracelets, armlets, necklaces, and anklets.

The scholar István Keul writes that the yogini images are of dark chlorite rock, about 40 cm tall, and standing in varying poses on plinths or vahanas, their animal vehicles; most have "delicate features and sensual bodies with slender waists, broad hips, and high, round breasts" with varying hairstyles and body ornaments.

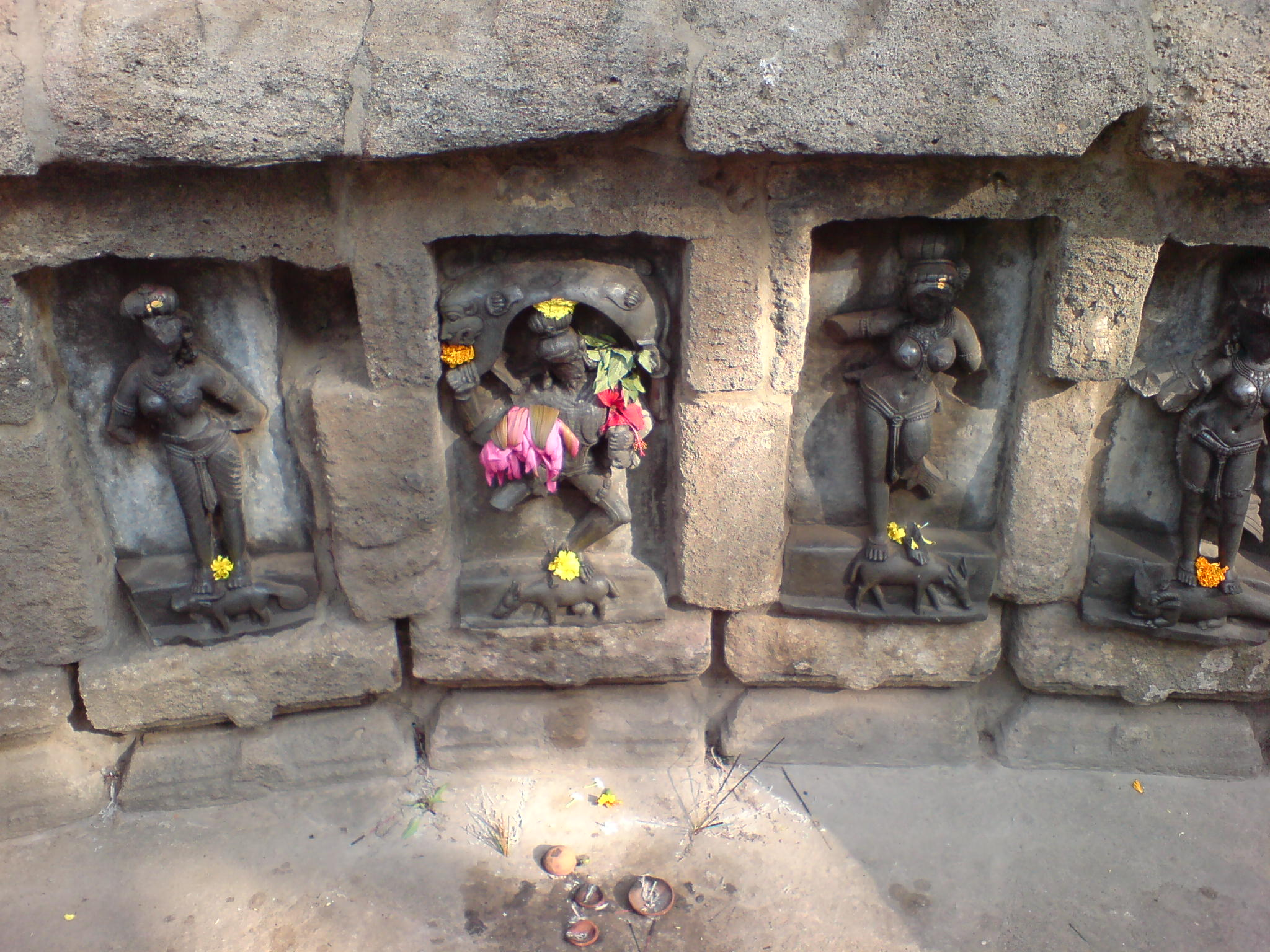
Yogini images in simple niches

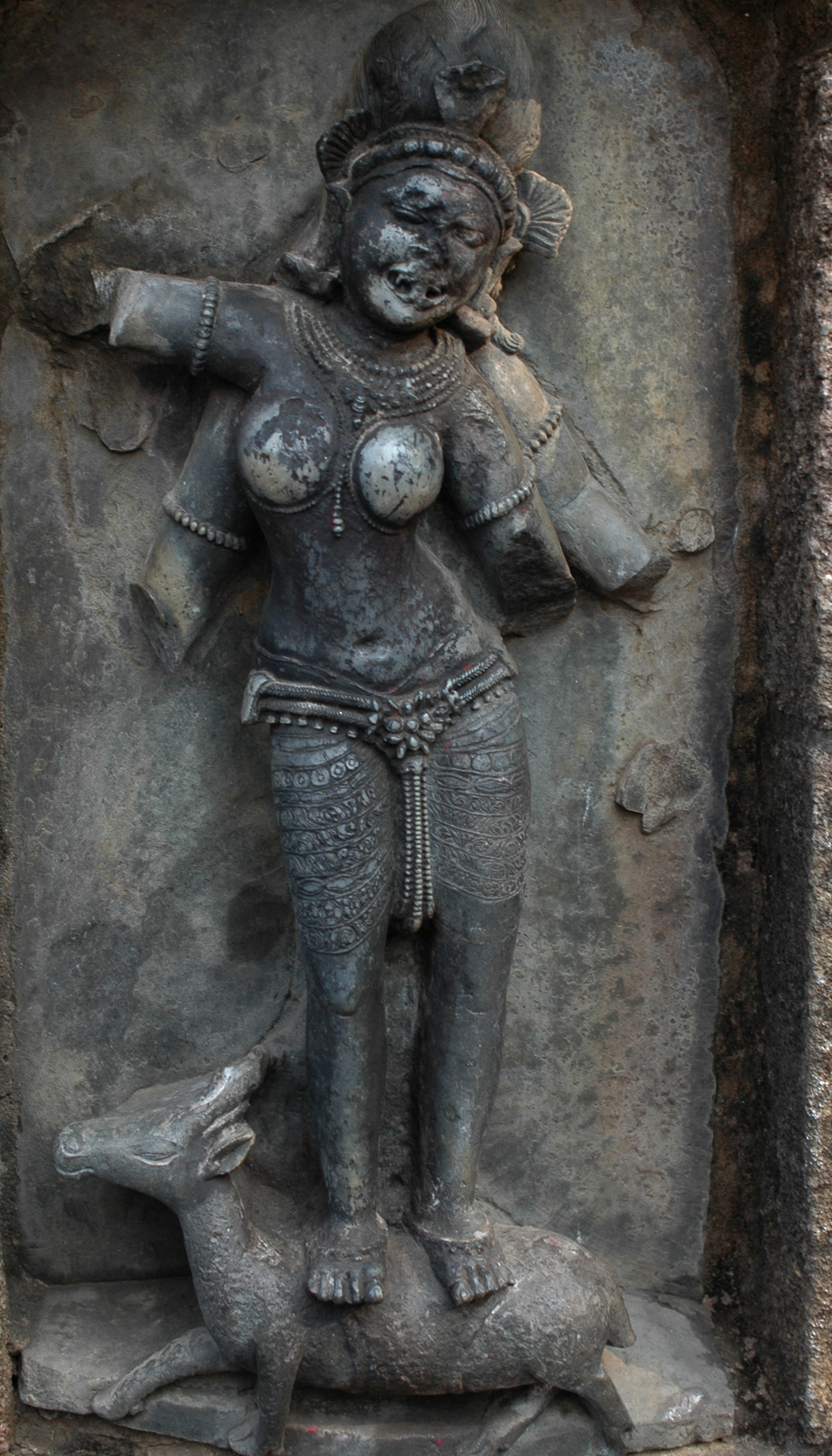
One of the Yoginis

Plan; scholars have noted the resemblance to a yoni-pedestal

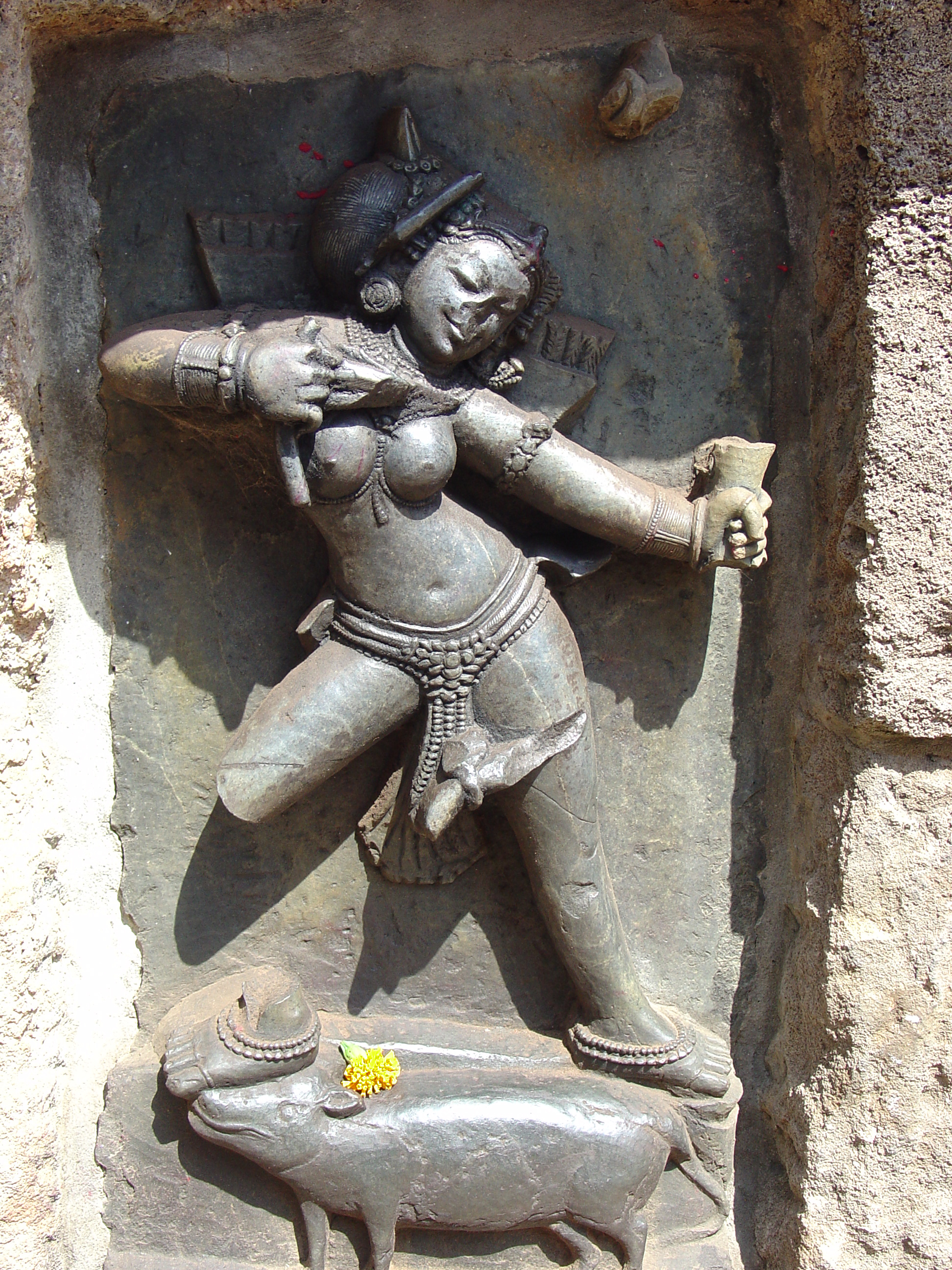
A yogini with an offering of flowers at her feet

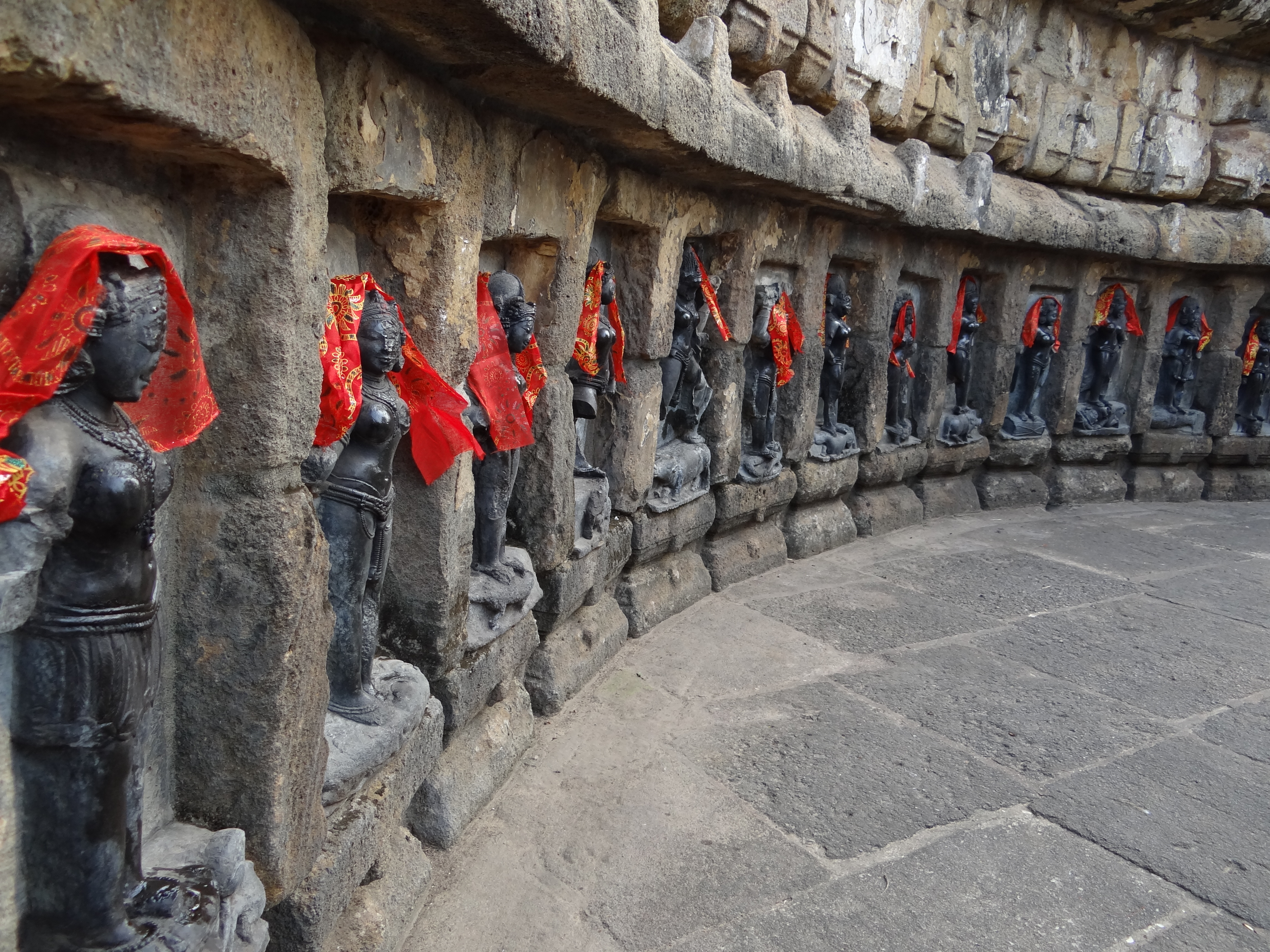
Part of the circle of Yoginis

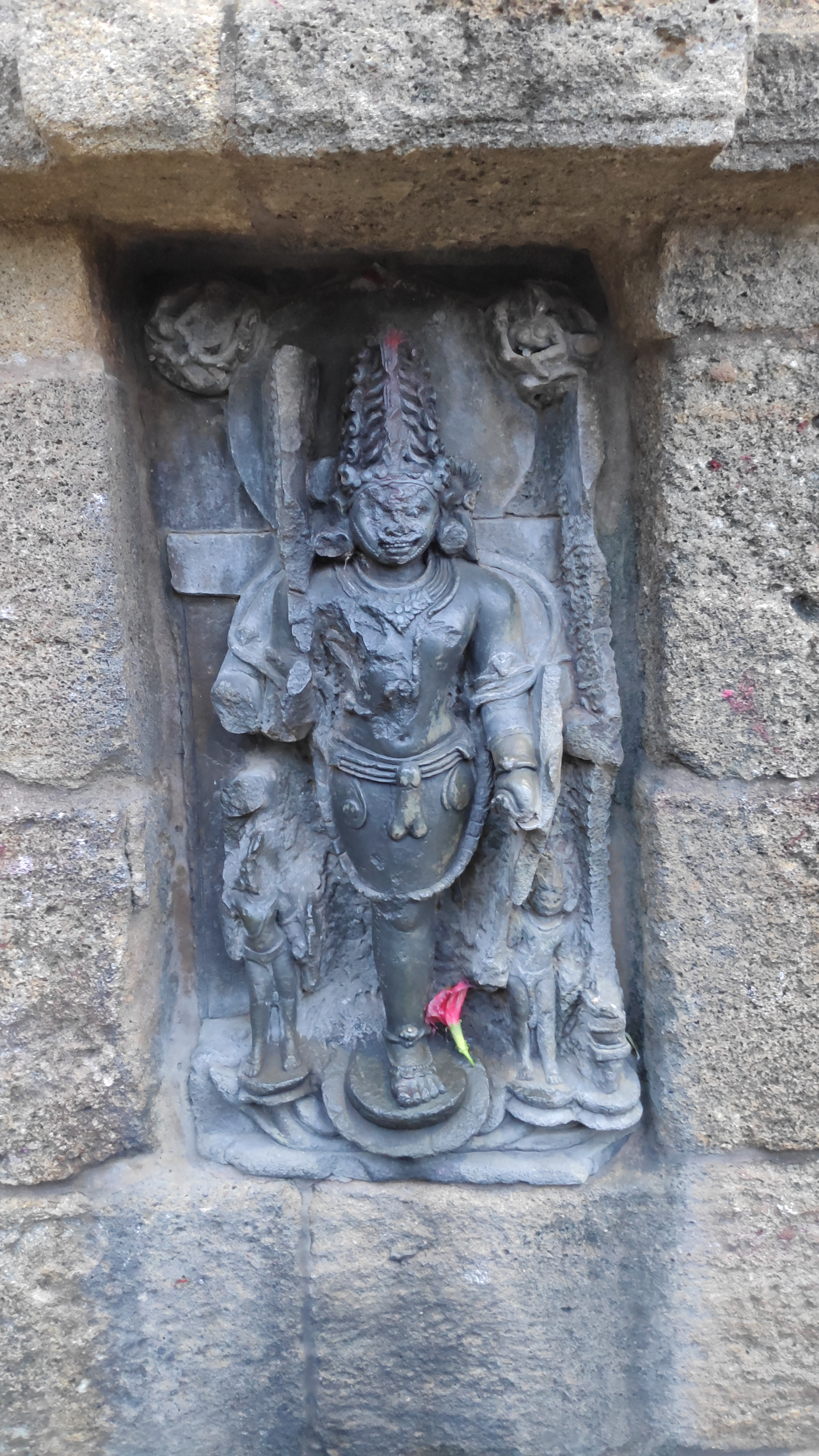
One legged Ekapada-Bhairava

== See also ==
- Chausath Yogini Temple, Bhedaghat
- Chausath Yogini Temple, Ranipur Jharial
- Chausath Yogini Temple, Mitaoli
- Chausath Yogini Temple, Khajuraho

== Bibliography ==
- Das, Adyasha (2019). The Chausathi Yoginis of Hirapur: From Tantra to Tourism. Black Eagle. ISBN 978-1-64560-012-1.
- Dehejia, Vidya (1986). Yogini Cult and Temples: A Tantric Tradition. National Museum, Janpath, New Delhi.
- Hatley, Shaman (2007). The Brahmayāmalatantra and Early Śaiva Cult of Yoginīs. University of Pennsylvania (PhD Thesis, UMI Number: 3292099). pp. 1–459. Archived from the original on 23 July 2010.
- Keul, István (2012). "Blending into the Religious Landscape: The Yoginīs in Benares". Numen. 59 (4). Brill: 366–402. doi:10.1163/156852712x641796. ISSN 0029-5973. JSTOR 23244944.
