= Sundaresvarar Temple =

Sundaresvarar Temple or Meenakshi Sundaresvarar Temple may refer to the following Hindu temples dedicated to Meenakshi (Parvati) and Shiva in Southern India, chiefly in the state of Tamil Nadu:

- Meenakshi Temple, Madurai
- Meenakshi Sundaresvarar Temple, Arimalam, Pudukkottai
- Sundaresvarar Temple, Durvasapuram, Pudukkottai
- Sundaresvarar Temple, Kattur, Tiruvarur
- Sundaresvarar Temple, Koranattukarupur, Thanjavur
- Sundaresvarar Temple, Kundayur, Nagapattinam
- Meenakshi Sundaresvarar Temple, Sindhu Poondurai, Tirunelveli
- Sundaresvarar Temple, Tiruloki, Thanjavur
- Sundaresvarar Temple, Tiruvettakkudi, Karaikal (Puducherry)
- Sundaresvarar Temple, Vadiveesvaram, Kanyakumari

== See also ==
- Meenakshi Sundareshwar, a 2021 Indian romantic comedy film by Vivek Soni
  - Meenakshi Sundareshwar (soundtrack), its soundtrack by Justin Prabhakaran
