= Brahmapurisvarar Temple =

Brahmapurisvarar Temple may refer to the following Siva temples in Tamil Nadu, India:

- Brahmapurisvarar Temple, Esanur, in Nagapattinam district
- Brahmapurisvarar Temple, Perambur, in Mayiladuthurai district
- Brahmapurisvarar Temple, Thiruppattur, in Tiruchirappalli district
- Brahmapurisvarar Temple, Vilathotti, in Mayiladuthurai district
- Brahmapureeswarar Temple, Tiruchirappalli district
- Brahmapureeswarar Temple, Thirukkuvalai, Nagapattinam district
- Ambal Brahmapureeswarar Temple, Tiruvarur district

== See also ==
- Brahmapuri (disambiguation)
