= Vaippu Sthalam =

Group of Hindu temples in South India

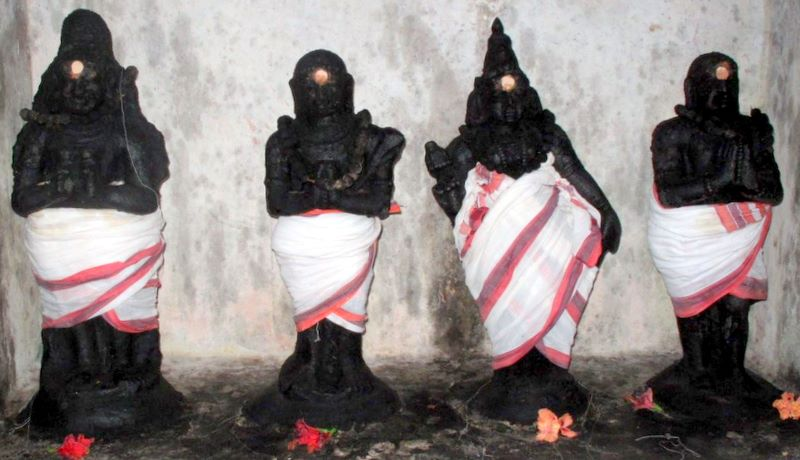
The three foremost Nayanars with Manikkavacakar - collectively called the Nalvar: (from left) Sambandar, Appar, Sundarar, Manikkavacakar.

A Vaippu Sthalam, also called a Tevara Vaippu Sthalam, is one of the Hindu temples in South India that is referenced in the songs in the Tevaram, hymns composed in praise of Shiva during the 7th-8th century.

The Paadal Petra Sthalam by comparison are 276 temples that are revered in the verses of Shaiva Nayanars in the 6th-9th century CE.

Verses	Poet
1, 2, 3. Tirukadaikkappu	Sambandar
4, 5, 6. Tevaram	Appar
7. Tirupattu	Sundarar
8. Tiruvacakam and Tirukkovaiyar	Manikkavacakar
9. Tiruvicaippa and Tiruppallantu	Various poets
10. Tirumantiram	Tirumular
11. Prabandham	Various poets
12. Periya Puranam	Sekkilar

== Tevaram ==
The Tevaram is the collection of verses sung in praise of Shiva by the sixty-three Nayanars, most prominent among whom were three Tamil poet-saints named Appar, Sambandar, and Sundarar. The former two lived in the 7th century CE while the latter around 8th century CE. All songs of the Tevaram are believed to be in sets of 10 songs (called patikam in Tamil).

== List of Vaippu Sthalams ==
The list of the Vaippu Sthalams is found in each verse of Tevaram that may be part of verses glorifying other temples (Paadal Petra Sthalam).

Place (Sthalam)	Poet and Verse	Location
Akkicharam/Agniswarar Temple	Appar 6-71-8	Thanjavur district
Asokandi, Ayokandi/Seeyathamangai Ayavandeeswarar Temple	Appar 6-7-10, 6-70-9	Tiruvarur district
Agaththiccuram/Agastheeswarar Temple	Appar 6-71-8	Kanyakumari
Annavasal/Virutthapurisvarar Temple	Appar 6-71-7	
Adi Annamalai/Adi Annamalaiyar Temple	Appar 4-63-1 & 4	
Athangudi	Sambandar 2-39-10	
Athamayanamalai	Appar 6-71-9	
Athi	Sambandar 2-39-2	
Athiccuram/Sivasailam Temple	Appar 6-71-8	Tenkasi
Amudhanur	Sundarar 7-12-1	
Ayaniccuram/Brahmadesam/Kailasanathar Temple	Appar 6-71-6	
Arananallur	Appar 6-7-7	
Arichandhiram/Parkkulam/Chandramoulisvarar Temple	Appar 6-51-10	
Poondurai/Avalpoondurai/Pushpavanesvarar Temple	Appar 6-71-11	
Alappur/Tharangambadi/Masilamaninathar temple	Appar 6-51-3, 6-70-4, 6-71-4; Sundarar 7-47-4	
Arappalli/	Sambandar 2-39-4; Appar 5-34-1, 6-70-1 & 6-71-1	
Atakeccuram/Nagabilam/Atakeccuram Nagabilam Temple	Appar 6-71-8	0
Aadhiraiyaanpattinam/Adirampattinam/Abhaya Varadeeswarar Temple	Sundarar 7-31-6	
Alandhurai/Vadathirthesvarar Temple	-	
Aziyur/Gangalanathasamy Temple	Appar 6-70-7; Sundarar 7-12-7	
Arai	Sambandar 2-39-5	
Araimerrali/Tirumetrazhi/Kailasanathar Temple	Sundarar 7-35-1	
Anpatti /perur/Perur Pateeswarar Temple	Sambandar 2-39-1; Appar 6-7-10, 6-51-8, 6-70-2; Sundarar 7-47-4, 7-90-10	
Iccaiyur	Sundarar 7-31-4	
Idavai	Appar 6-70-3	
Idaikkulam/Airavateswarar Temple	Appar 6-71-10	
Idaithanam	Appar 6-7-8	
Idaippalli	Sambandar 2-39-4	
Irappatticcuram/Seshapurisvarar Temple	Appar 6-25-10	
Irumpudhal/Trilokanathar Temple	Appar 6-51-6	
Ilangkoil	Appar 6-71-5	
Ilamar/Visvanathar Temple	Appar 6-70-4	
Ilaiyankudi/Rajendracholiswarar Temple	Sundarar 7-39-1	
Iraikkadu	Sundarar 7-47-3	
Iraiyanceri/Mummudinathar Temple	Appar 6-70-4	
Iraiyanur	Sundarar 7-31-5	
Icanur/Brahmapurisvarar Temple	Sundarar 7-31-8	
Unnir	Appar 6-7-7	
Udhayamalai	Appar 6-71-9	
Uruthirakodi/Rudrakodisvarar Temple	Appar 6-70-8	
Urraththur/Suttharathnesvarar Temple	Appar 6-70-10, 6-71-4	
En^galur	Sundarar 7-31-6	
Endhaiyur	Sundarar 7-31-1	
Eccililamar	Appar 6-70-4	
Ennur	Sundarar 7-12-6	
Ezhumur/Arthanarisvarar Temple	Appar 6-70-5	
Eakampathu/Ekambaranathar Temple	Appar 6-70-4	0
Eman^allur/Tiruloki/Sundaresvarar Temple	Appar 6-70-4	
Emakutamalai	Appar 6-7-8, 6-71-9	
Eman^allur/Sundaresvarar Temple	Appar 6-70-4	
Emapperur/Vanmeekanathar Temple	Appar 6-70-3	
Eyiccuram	Appar 6-7-8	
Eaar/Kanthanathaswamy Temple	Appar 6-51-6, 6-70-3	
Ezhur/Kailasanathar Temple	Appar 6-70-5	
Eranur/EtramanurEttumanoor Mahadevar Temple	Sundarar 7-31-9	
Oretakam	Appar 6-7-10	
Kaccippalathali/Karchapeswarar Temple	Appar 6-70-4	
Kaccimayanam/Kaccimayanesvarar Temple	Appar 6-97-10	
Kacciyur	Sundarar 7-31-4	
Kaccaiyur	Sundarar 7-31-4	
Kanjaru/Ananthathandesvarar Temple	Appar 6-70-8	
Kadangalur	Sundarar 7-31-3	
Kadampai ilangkoil/Uthrapathisvarar Temple	Appar 6-70-5	
Kadaiyakkudi	Appar 6-71-3	
Kannai/Rishabesvarar Temple	Appar 6-70-6	
Kandamadhanamalai/Kandhamaadhanamalai, Thiruchendur	Appar 6-71-9	
Karapuram/Karapurisvarar Temple	Appar 6-7-7	Uthamachozhapuram in Salem district
Karukarkural	Sundarar 7-47-5	
Karundthittaikkudi/Vasishtesvarar Temple	Appar 6-71-3	
Karuppur/Agastisvarar Temple	Sundarar 7-98-3	
Karumari	Appar 6-7-11	
Kazhunirkkunram/Sengalvarayaswamy Temple	Appar 6-13-4	
Kazhumaram	Sundarar	
Kalandhai/Azhagiyanathaswamy Temple	Sundarar 7-39-6	
Kattur/Sundaresvarar Temple	Sambandar 2-39-7; Sundarar 7-47-1	
Kampili/Kampili Shiva Temple	Appar 6-70-2	
Kamarasavalli	Appar	
Karikkarai/Ramagiri/Valeesvarar Temple	Sundarar 7-31-3	
Kavam	Sundarar 7-31-4	
Kalingam	Appar 6-7-5	
Kinar	Sambandar	
Kizhaiyam	Sundarar 7-12-5	
Killikudi/Agastisvarar Temple	Sundarar 7-12-7	
Kizhaiyil/Semmalainathar Temple	Sundarar 7-12-7	
Keezhatthanjai/Srimoolanathar Temple	Sundarar 7-12-9	
Kizhaivazhi	Sundarar 7-12-5	
Kukkudechuram/Siva Temple	Appar 6-71-8	
Kukaiyur	Appar	
Kundaiyur/Sundaresvarar Temple	Sundarar 7-20-1	
Gunavayil/Siva Temple	Sambandar 2-39-7; Appar 6-71-7	
Kuthangudi/Kodeesvarar Temple	Sambandar 2-39-10	
Kumari	Appar 6-70-9	
Kumarikongu/Asaladeebesvarar Temple	Appar 6-70-9	
Kuyilalandurai	Appar 6-71-11	
Kurakkuthali/Sukreesvarar Temple	Sundarar 7-47-2	
Kurukkethiram/KurukshetraKurukshetra Shiva Temple	Sundarar 7-78-6	
Kurundhangudi	Sambandar 2-39-10	
Kunriyur/Visvanathar Temple	Sambandar 2-39-1; Appar 6-70-5	
Kunraiyur	Sundarar 7-39-1	
Kundalur/Jambukaranyesvarar Temple	Appar 6-70-9	
Kurur	Sambandar 2-39-1	
Kuzaiyur/Agastheesvarar Temple	Appar 6-70-9	
Kuranur	Sundarar 7-32-9	
Kaimmai	Sundarar 7-12-5	
Konganam	Appar 6-70-5	
Kodungkolur/Makothai Mahadevar Temple, Kodungallur	Appar 6-70-5	
Kondal/Tharakaparamesvarar Temple	Appar 6-51-9; Sundarar 7-12-2	
Kollimalai/Arapaleeswarar temple	Appar 5-34-1	
Govindaputhur/Govandaputhur/Ganga Jadadisvarar Temple	Appar 5-71-3	
Kozhunal	Sundarar 7-47-1	
Kottukka	Appar 6-7-5	
Kottukkadu	Appar 6-70-2	
Kothittai	Appar 6-70-3, 6-71-2; Sundarar 7-3-1	
Kovanthapuththur	Appar 6-71-3	
Sadaimudi/Divyagnanesvarar Temple	Appar 6-70-3	
Salaikkudi	Appar 6-70-3	
Siddhavadamadam/Chidambaresvarar Temple	Appar 4-2-3	
Sindhaiyur	Sundarar 7-31-1	
Sivappalli/Kailasanathar Temple	Appar 6-71-1	
Sirappalli	Sambandar 2-39-4	
Surrumur	Sundarar 7-31-2	
Sulamangai/Kiruthivakesvarar Temple	Appar 6-70-10	
Sengunrur/Chengannur Mahadeva Temple	Appar 6-70-5	
Senthil/Thiruchendur Murugan temple	Appar 6-23-4	
Sempangudi/Rudrakodisvarar Temple	Appar 6-7-3	
Serrur	Appar 6-71-4	
Saiyamalai	Appar 6-71-10	
Somesam	Appar 6-70-10	
Gnazalvayil	Appar 6-71-7	
Gnazarkoyil	Appar 6-71-5	
Thakkalur/Tirulokanathar Temple	Appar 6-2-1, 6-70-3; Sundarar 7-12-1	
Thakattur/Bairavanathar Temple	Sundarar 7-12-1	
Koyildevarayanpettai/Macchapurisvarar Temple	Sambandar	
Thakadur/Mallikarjunar Temple	Sundarar 7-12-1	
Thangalur	Sundarar 7-31-6	
Thanjakkai/Paranjothi Easwarar Temple	Sundarar 7-12-9	
Thanjai	Appar 6-70-8; Sundarar 7-12-9	
Thanjai thalikkulam/Thalikkulanathar Temple	Appar 6-51-8, 6-71-10	
Thantankurai/Kailasanathar Temple	Sundarar 7-12-2	
Thantandthottam/Natanapureesvarar Temple	Sundarar 7-12-2	
Thavathurai/Saptharishishwarar Temple	Appar 6-71-11	
Thavappalli	Appar 6-71-1	
Thalikkulam/Ezhumesvaramudayar Temple	Appar 6-71-10	
Thalicchathangudi/Dharmapureesvarar Temple	Appar 6-25-10	
Thazhaiyur	Sundarar 7-12-1	
Thingalur/Kailasanathar Temple	Appar 6-25-3; Sundarar 7-31-6	
Thinticcharam/Thinthirineesvarar Temple	Appar 6-7-8, 6-70-9	
Tripuranthakam/Simhachalam/Thiripurantakar Temple	Appar 6-7-5	
Tripuranthakam/Simhachalam/Thiripurantakesvararar Temple	Appar 6-7-5	
Thirukkulam	Appar 6-71-10	
Thirucchirrambalam/Puradhanavaneswarar Temple	Sundarar 7-12-4	
Thiruthalaiyur	Appar	
Thirunarkunram/Pasupatheesvarar Temple	Sambandar 2-39-9	
Thiruppulivanam	Appar	
Thirumalai/Thirumalai Kovil		
Thirumalai/Rajacholeesvarar Temple	Sundarar 7-12-7	
Thiruvankudi	Sambandar 2-39-10	
Thiruvadhiraiyanpattinam	Sundarar 7-31-6	
Thiruvamur	Appar	
Thiruvetty/Thiruvettisvarar Temple	Appar 6-7-7	
Thudaiyur/Vishamangalesvarar Temple	Appar 6-71-4	
Thuvaiyur	Appar 6-71-4	
Thellaru/Thirumoolattanesvarar Temple	Appar 6-71-10	
Thenkalakkudi/Sathya Vageeswarar Temple	Appar 6-71-3	
Thenkodi/Rudrakodisvarar Temple	Sambandar 2-39-1	
Thenpanaiyur	Sundarar 7-12-8	
Thennur	Sundarar 7-12-6	
Thengur	Sundarar 7-12-4, 7-47-6	
Thesanur	Sundarar 7-31-8	
Therur	Appar 6-25-3	
Thevanur	Sundarar 7-12-6	
Thevicchuram/Sundaresvarar Temple	Appar 6-7-5	
Theranur	Sundarar 7-31-9	
Thenur/Nandhikesvarar Temple	Sambandar 1-61-9; Appar 6-41-9	
Thozhur/Choleesvarar Temple	Appar 6-70-5, 6-71-4	
Nangalur	Sundarar 7-31-6	
Nandikecchuram/Nandeesvarar Temple	Appar 6-71-8	
Nandikecchuram/Nandeesvarar Temple	Appar 6-71-8	
Nampanur	Sundarar 7-12-3	
Nallakkudi/Alanduraiappar Temple	Appar 6-71-1	
Nallathur	Appar	
Nallarrur/Pasupatheesvarar Temple	Appar 6-71-4	
Nagalecchuram/Nagesvarar Temple	Appar 6-71-8	
Nangur/Mathangeesvarar Temple	Sundarar 7-1-24, 7-47-6	
Nalanur	Sundarar 7-12-3	
Nalaru	Appar 6-71-10	
Nalur	Sundarar 7-31-6	
Narranam	Sundarar 7-38-4	
Niyamanallur	Appar 6-70-5	
Niyamam/Iravathesvarar Temple	Appar 6-13-4	
Niraikkadu	Sundarar 7-47-3	
Niraiyanur	Sundarar 7-31-5	
Ninravur	Sundarar 7-39-11	
Nilamalai	Appar 6-71-9	
Neduvayil/Soundaresvarar Temple	Sambandar 2-39-9; Appar 6-71-7	
Neithalvayil/Munivasakasamy Temple	Appar 6-71-7	
Nerkunram	Campantar 2-39-9	
Panjakkai/Panjapurisvarar Temple	Appar 6-70-8	
Pandaiyur	Sundarar 7-31-1	
Parappalli/Paranjervazhi/Madhyapurisvarar Temple	Appar 6-71-1	
Paramanur	Sundarar 7-12-10	
Pavvanthiri	Appar 6-7-6	
Pazhaiyaru/Pazhayarai Vadathali	Sambandar 2-39-5; Appar 6-13-1	
Pannur/Adhilingesvarar Temple	Sundarar 7-12-6	
Pangur	Sundarar 7-12-4	
Pasanur	Sundarar 7-31-8	
Pattur	Sundarar 7-47-1	
Parur	Sundarar 7-47-4	
Paynalam	Sundarar 7-12-6	
Nasanur	Sundarar 7-31-8	
Pavanasam	Appar 6-7-6	
Parkulam	Appar 6-13-1	
Pidavur/Brahmapurisvarar Temple	Appar 6-7-6, 6-70-2	
Pirambil/Brahmapurisvarar Temple	Appar 6-70-6	
Piraiyanur	Appar	
Pudukkudi/Svatharanesvarar Temple	Appar 6-71-3	
Purichandiram	Appar 6-51-10	
Purisai nattup purisai/Agastheesvarar Temple	Sundarar 7-12-6	
Pulivalam/Dakshinakokarnesvarar Temple	Appar 6-51-11, 6-70-11	
Sindhu Poondurai/Meenakshi Sundaresvarar Temple	Appar 6-71-11	
Puvanam/Kampaheswarar Temple	Appar 6-51-11	
Purkudi	Appar 6-71-3	
Pungur	Sundarar 7-12-4	
Pundurai	Sambandar 3-92-8; Appar 6-7-11	
Puziyur	Sambandar 2-39-8	
Perundurai/Adi Kailasanathar Temple	Appar 6-70-2, 6-71-11	
Perumur	Appar 6-31-5	
Peravur/Aditesvarar Temple	Appar 6-70-2, 6-71-4	
Peranur	Appar 6-31-9, Sundarar 7-31-9	
Podhiyinmalai/Papanasanathar temple	Sambandar 1-50-10, 1-79-1; Appar 6-70-8	
Poikai	Appar 6-70-11	
Poikainallur/Nandinadesvarar Temple	Appar 6-70-11	
Poruppalli	Appar 6-71-1	
Ponnur nattup ponnur/Tirukamesvarar Temple	Sundarar 7-12-6	
Porrur	Sambandar 2-39-8	
Makkiccharam	Appar 6-71-8	
Makanur	Appar; Sundarar	
Mahameru	Appar 6-71-9	
Mahenthiramalai	Appar 6-71-9	
Manarkal/Agastisvarar Temple	Appar 6-25-10	
Manikkoyil/Tirumeni Azhagar Temple	Appar 6-71-5	
Manimutham	Appar 6-7-6	
Mathangudi	Sambandar 2-39-10	
Mandaram/Mandaravanesvarar Temple	Appar 6-70-6	
Maraiyanur	Sundarar 7-31-5	
Mahalam/Mahakalesvarar Temple	Appar 6-7-11, 6-51-7; Sundarar 7-47-5	
Mahaleccuram/Mahakaleshwar Jyotirlinga	Appar 6-71-8	
Makudi/Sivalokanathar Temple	Appar 6-71-3	
Mattur/Satyavasahar Temple	Sambandar 2-39-7; Sundarar 7-47-1	
Mattur/Valisvarar Temple	Sambandar 2-39-7; Sundarar 7-47-1	
Manikudi	Appar 6-71-3	
Mathanam	Appar 6-70-8	
Manadhi	Appar 6-7-4	
Mavur	Appar 6-7-12	
Manthurai/Tirumanthurai/Akshayanathasamy Temple	Sambandar	
Maranpadi/Thagamthirtthapurisvarar Temple	Sambandar 2-39-3	
Manirupam	Appar 6-7-12	
Mizhalainattu mizhalai/Devanathaswamy Temple	Sundarar 7-12-5	
Miraikkadu	Sundarar 7-47-3	
Muthalvanur	Sundarar 7-12-3	
Mundaiyur	Sundarar 7-31-1	
Muzhaiyur/Parasunathar Temple	Appar 6-41-9, 6-70-1	
Mulanur/Choleesvarar Temple	Sundarar 7-12-3	
Muthur	Sundarar 7-47-9	
Muvalur/Margasahayesvarar Temple	Appar 5-65-8	
Mokkaneesvaram/Mokkaneesvarar Temple	Sundarar	
Vada Kanjanur/Ramalingesvarar Temple	Sundarar 7-12-8	
Vadaperur	Sundarar 7-31-4	
Vidaivaikkudi/Visvanathar Temple	Appar 6-71-3	
Varandai	Sambandar 1-61-3	
Varignsai	Sundarar 7-39-7	
Vazhuvur/Viratteswara Temple	Appar 6-70-1, 6-71-2	
Valavi	Appar 6-13-1	
Valaikulam/Nagesvarar Temple	Appar 6-50-8, 6-71-10	
Vathavur	Sambandar 2-39-7	
Varanasi/Kashi Vishwanath Temple	Sambandar 2-39-7; Appar 6-70-6	
Vidangalur	Sundarar 7-31-3	
Viratapuram	Appar 6-70-6	
Vivicchuram/Somarama	Appar 6-70-8	
Vilathur	Sundarar 7-12-8	
Vilathotti/Brahmapurisvarar Temple	Appar 6-70-6	
Vindamamalai	Appar 6-71-9	
Vekulicchuram	Appar 6-7-11	
Venni nattu mizalai	Sundarar 7-12-5	
Vellaru	Sundarar 7-38-4	
Verriyur/Vanmeekanathar Temple	Sambandar 2-39-6; Appar 6-70-8; Sundarar 7-12-3	
Vengur	Appar 6-70-7; Sundarar 7-47-6	
Vetham	Appar 6-71-9	
Vethicchuram	Appar 6-70-8	
Velanur	Sundarar 7-12-3	
Velarnattu velur	Sundarar 7-12-8	
