= Nandhikesvarar Temple, Thenur =

Shiva temple in Perambalur district, Tamil Nadu, India

Nandhikesvarar Temple is a Hindu temple dedicated to the deity Shiva, located at Thenur in Perambalur district, Tamil Nadu, India.

== Vaippu Sthalam ==
It is one of the shrines of the Vaippu Sthalams sung by Tamil Saivite Nayanars Appar and Sambandar. This place is also known as Mathuvapuri.

== Presiding deity ==
The presiding deity in the garbhagriha, represented by the lingam, is known as Nandhikesvarar. The goddess is known as Mahasambathgowri and Perunthiru Piratti.

== Specialities ==
The presiding deity is wonderful to look at. In front of the shrine of the presiding deity, in the mandapa, the sculpture of Saraba is found. Zamindars of Thuraiyur have carried out renovations. In the front mandapa of the east gate, the sculptures of Zambindar and his wife are found on the pillars. Sivaratri and Maham festivals are celebrated in this temple.

== Structure ==
In the entrance, at the facade, the stucco sculptures of Vinayaka, Risabarudar, and Subramania are found. After crossing the entrance, the shrine of the goddess is found. She is found in a standing posture. It is facing south. The shrine of the presiding deity is facing east. Dwarapalakas are found on either side of the entrance of the garbhagriha. The shrine of the goddess is facing south. In the Prakara temple, vahanas are kept. Kartikeya with the peacock is found. Sculptures of Bairava, Surya and Navagraha are found. The compound wall is found to be dilapidated. Kosta sculptures are found in the shrines of the presiding deity and the goddess.

== Location ==
The temple is at Thenur, 32 km north of Trichy-Thuraiyur road, via Ethumalai in the north. This temple can be reached from Thiruppattur Brahmapurisvarar Temple, located 11 km north-west. One-time puja is held in this temple daily. The temple is found in the Thenur bus stop.
