= Kaleshwar =

Kaleshwar may refer to:

- A form the Hindu god Shiva (see Jyotirlinga)
- Shri Kaleshwar Mandir, a Hindu temple in Nerur, Sindhudurg District, Maharashtra
- Mahakaleshwar Jyotirlinga, a Hindu temple in Ujjain, Ujjain District, Madhya Pradesh
- Mahakalesvarar Temple, Anai Mahalam, Shiva temple in Tamil Nadu, India
