= Agastisvarar Temple, Koranattukarupur =

Shiva temple in Tamil Nadu, India

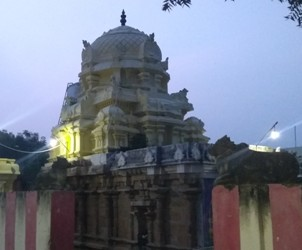
Entrance

Agastisvarar Temple is a Siva temple in Koranattukarupur near Kumbakonam in Thanjavur district in Tamil Nadu, India. It is one of the shrines of the Vaippu Sthalams sung by Tamil Saivite Nayanar Sundarar. The presiding deity is known as Agastisvarar. His consort is known as Akilandesvari.

== Gallery ==
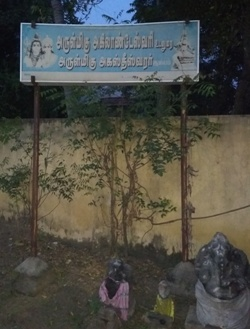
Name board of the temple

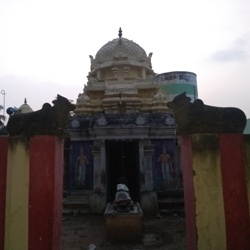
Temple entrance

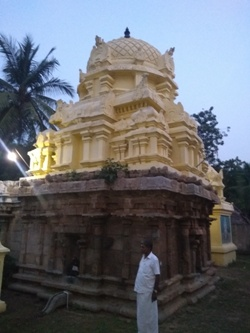
Vimana of the Presiding deity

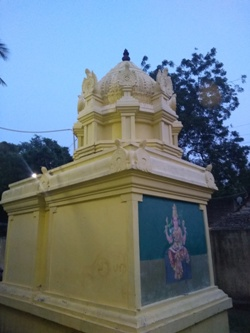
Vimana of Goddess

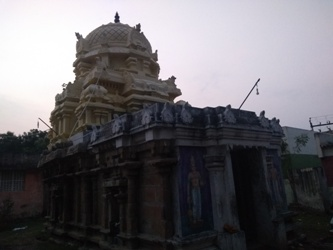
Another view of the temple
