= Brahmapuri =

Brahmapuri may refer to:

- Brahmaloka, heavenly abode of the Hindu god Brahma
- Brahmapuri, another name for Varanasi, a holy city in India
- Brahmapuri, Bara, Nepal
- Brahmapuri, Janakpur, Nepal
- Brahmapuri, Rautahat, Nepal
- Brahmapuri, Jodhpur, Rajasthan, India
- Bramhapuri, Chandrapur, Maharashtra, India
- Brahmapuri (Vidhan Sabha constituency), Maharashtra

== See also ==
- Brahmapur (disambiguation)
- Brahmapurisvarar Temple (disambiguation)
