= Munivasakasamy Temple, Neithavasal =

Shiva temple in Tamil Nadu, India

Munivasakasamy Temple, Neithavasal is a Siva temple in Mayiladuthurai district in Tamil Nadu (India). It is at distance of 3 km from Tiruvenkadu Neithalvayil is called by local people as Neithavasal now.

== Vaippu Sthalam ==
The Vaippu Sthalam also Called Tevara Vaippu Sthalam are places in South India that were mentioned casually in the songs in Tevaram, hymns composed in praise of Lord Shiva during 7th-8th century. It is one of the shrines of the Vaippu Sthalams sung by Tamil Saivite Nayanar Appar. This place might have been the Neithalankanal very Kaverippumpattinam. Later it might have got the name of Neithalvasal.

== List of Vaippu Sthalam ==
The list of the Vaippu Sthalam is found in each verse of Tevaram that may be part of verses glorifying other temples.

== Presiding deity ==
The presiding deity in the garbhagriha, represented by the lingam, is Munivasakasamy. He is also known Kailasanathar. His consort is known as Mathurabashini.

== Shrines ==
In the Prakaram shrines of Vinayaka, Subramania, Bairava and Sanisvara are found.

== Accessibility ==
From Tiruvenkadu the corner of the place where the temple car was kept can be seen. From there one should go through left. From there at a distance of 3 km this place can be reached.
