= Kurukshetra Shiva Temple =

Hindu temple in Haryana, India

Kurukshetra Shiva Temple is a Hindu temple dedicated to the deity Shiva, located at Kurukshetra in Haryana, India.

== Vaippu Sthalam ==
It is one of the shrines of the Vaippu Sthalams sung by Tamil Saivite Nayanar Sundarar.

== Presiding deity ==
The presiding deity in the garbhagriha, is represented by the lingam. In the rear side the sculpture of Kunti, who worshipped the deity is found.

== Specialities ==
This place gave Bhagavad Gita. It has the longest tank in India. This place is also known as Dharmakshetra, Brahmashetra, Aryavardha and Uthiravedi.

== Location ==
Kurukshetra can be reached from New Delhi by train or bus.
