= Sengalvarayaswamy Temple, Tiruttani =

Shiva temple in Tamil Nadu, India

Sengalvarayaswamy Temple is a Hindu temple dedicated to the deity Shiva, located at Tiruttani in Tiruvallur district, Tamil Nadu, India. It is also known as Sengalvarayaswamy Sengazhunir Vinayaka Temple and Sengalvarayaswamy Subramaniar Temple.

== Vaippu Sthalam ==
It is one of the Vaippu Sthalams mentioned in songs by Tamil Saivite Nayanar Appar, one of the 63 Hindu saints living in Tamil Nadu during the 6th to 8th centuries CE.

== Presiding deity ==
The presiding deity represented by the lingam is known as Sengalvarayaswamy.
