= Nagesvarar Temple, Nagaleccharam =

Shiva temple in Tamil Nadu, India

Nagesvarar Temple is a Hindu temple dedicated to the deity Shiva, located at Nageccharam in Nagapattinam district, Tamil Nadu, India.

== Vaippu Sthalam ==
It is one of the shrines of the Vaippu Sthalams sung by Tamil Saivite Nayanar Appar. This temple is also known as Nagesvaram. There is also a place known as Thirunageswaram near Kumbakonam.

== Presiding deity ==
The presiding deity in the garbhagriha, represented by the lingam, is known as Nagesvarar and Naganathar. The Goddess is known as Ponnagavalli Ponnagavalli Ammal.

== Specialities ==
In order to get rid of from their dosha, Rahu and Kethu did penance and worshipped the deity. The place where they worshipped was known as Nagesvaramudayar Temple in Sirkazhi. During the churning of the milky ocean by Asuras and devas, amirta came out of it. Vishnu wanted to give them to devas. But one asura took the form of a deva, and standing between Surya and Chandra to drank it. While they informed Vishnu, he in turn killed the asura. The head fell in a place which is known as Sirapuram. The body part of asura became two pieces and in turn as two snakes. These snakes worshipped Shiva and did penance. Shiva bestowed his blessings to him. They prayed Shiva to swallow Surya and Chandra. Shiva informed them their importance. He gave human head with snake body to Rahu and snake head and human body to Ketu. He also added them in graha and they were part of Navagraha. Lord Shiva can be worshipped in this place and other places such as Nandikeccuram, Mahaleccuram, Nagesvaram, Mahalesvaram, Kodeesvaram, Kondeesvaram, Tindeesvaram, Kukkudesvaram, Akkisvaram, Adakaccuram, Agasthisvaram, Ayaneecuram, Attisvaram, Sittisvaram and Ramesvaram.

== Structure ==
The temple has a three tier gopura, facing east. After going through the entrance the shrine of the presiding deity is found. At the right, facing south, the shrine of the goddess is found. One can worship them at a time by standing in a particular place. There are separate shrines for Rahu and Kethu. Very near to them Nāga devatha is found. This temple is known as Athi Rahusthalam and Athi Kethusthalam, the temple which exists from aeon for Raghu and Kethu. Shrines of Bhairava, Surya, Vinayaka, Sanisvara and Neeladevi are also found in this temple.

== Location ==
The temple is located at very near to Sirkazhi in Chidambaram-Sirkazhi road, at the road side. This temple is opened for worship from 7.00 a.m. to 12.00 noon and 4.00 p.m. to 8.00 p.m.
