= Svatharanesvarar Temple, Pudukkudi =

Shiva temple in Tamil Nadu, India

Religion
- Affiliation: Hinduism
- District: Tiruvarur
- Deity: Lord Shiva

Location
- Location: Perambur in Tiruvarur district
- State: Tamil Nadu
- Country: India

Svatharanesvarar Temple, Pudukkudi is a Siva temple in Perambur in Tiruvarur district in Tamil Nadu (India).

== Vaippu Sthalam ==
It is one of the shrines of the Vaippu Sthalams sung by Tamil Saivite Nayanar Appar. This place is now known as Pathinettu Pirambil.

== Presiding deity ==
The presiding deity is Svatharanesvarar. The Goddess is known as Anandavalli.

== Location ==
This temple is located in Kumbakonam-Eravanjeri road, just before Eravancheri
