= Margasahayesvarar Temple, Muvalur =

Shiva temple in Tamil Nadu, India

Margasahayesvarar Temple, Muvalur is a Siva temple in Muvalur in Mayiladuthurai district in Tamil Nadu (India).

== Vaippu Sthalam ==
It is one of the shrines of the Vaippu Sthalams sung by Tamil Saivite Nayanar Appar.

== Presiding deity ==
The presiding deity is Margasahayesvarar. The Goddess is known as Soundaranayaki.

== Speciality ==
As this place was worshipped by Brahma, Vishnu, and Shiva this place is known as Town of the Trinity or Moovalur. This place is also known as Punnahavanam.
