= Kaccimayanesvarar Temple, Kanchipuram =

Shiva temple in Tamil Nadu, India

Kaccimayanesvarar Temple is a Siva temple in Kanchipuram in Tamil Nadu (India).

== Vaippu Sthalam ==
It is one of the shrines of the Vaippu Sthalams sung by Tamil Saivite Nayanar Appar.

== Presiding deity ==
The presiding deity is known as Kaccimayanesvarar and Mayana Lingesvarar.

== Speciality ==
This temple is in the campus of Ekambareswarar Temple in Kanchipuram. This temple is found as a separate shrine, next to flagpost, at the right side. facing west.
