= Sivalokanathar Temple, Mamakudi =

Temple in Tamil Nadu, India

Sivalokanathar Temple is a Siva temple in Mamakudi in Mayiladuthurai district in Tamil Nadu (India).

== Vaippu Sthalam ==
It is one of the shrines of the Vaippu Sthalams sung by Tamil Saivite Nayanar Appar.

== Presiding deity ==
The presiding deity is known as Sivalokanathar Temple. The Goddess is known as Sivakamasundari.

== Speciality ==
The sculpture of Tamil Saivite Nayanar Sambandar is found in this temple.
