= Choleesvarar Temple, Thozhur =

Choleesvarar Temple is a Hindu temple dedicated to the deity Shiva, located at Thozhur in Namakkal district, Tamil Nadu, India.

== Vaippu Thalam ==
It is one of the shrines of the Vaippu Sthalams sung by Tamil Saivite Nayanar Appar.

== Presiding deity ==
The presiding deity in the garbhagriha, represented by the lingam, is known as Choleesvarar. The Goddess is known as Vislakshi.

== Specialities ==
During the rule of Kattiyannan, this place was the primary town for the seven towns found in the Kongu Nadu. They are Perumpalapatti, Perumakavundanpatti, Vandippalayam, Vempampatti, Puthuppatti, Kannanpatti and Ezhur.The presiding deity of the temple was sung by Appar in his songs "Kodungalur Anjai" and "Piraiyurum Sadai Muduiyum". Lord Shiva can be worshipped in Kodungallur, Anjaikkalam, Sengundrur, Konganam, Kundriyur, Kurakkukka, Nedungalam, Nannilam, Nellikka, Nindriyur, Needur, Niyamallur, Idumbavanam, Ezhumur, Ezhur, Thozhur, Erumbiyur, Emakudam and Kadambai Ilankovil. Those who worship the deity of this place and Aroor, Perumpatrapuliyur, Peravur, Naraiyur, Nallur, Nallatrur, Setrur, Naraiyur, Uraiyur, Othur, Utrathur, Alappur, Omampuliyur, Otriyur, Thuraiyur, Thuvaiyur and Thudaiyur will not get any hardship in the life. Now it is known as Tholur.

== Structure ==
It is said that this temple was built by one of the Early Chola kings, known as Karikal Chola in 700 C.E., Chera, Chola and Pandya kings made additions to this temple during their period. This temple is of granite structure. Flagpost made of granite is found in front of the temple. On the four sides sculptures of lingam, Dakshinamurthy, nandhi and Durga are found. In the prakara shrines of Surya, Valampuri Vinayaka, Nāga, Five lingas, Subramania, Navagraha, Bairava and Chandra Vinayaka and Nāga sculptures are found in this temple. The shrines of the presiding deity and the goddess have vimana. In the mandapa, shrine of the presiding deity is found.

== Location ==
The temple is located at Thozhur, at distance of 3 km in Namakkal-Mohanur road, in Aniapuram road west. All the town buses from Namakkal to Mohanur ply in this route. Daily one time puja is held in this temple.
