= Nandeesvarar Temple, Nandhimalai =

Nandeesvarar Temple is a Hindu temple dedicated to the deity Shiva, located at Nandhimalai in Karnataka, India.

== Vaippu Sthalam ==
It is one of the shrines of the Vaippu Sthalams sung by Tamil Saivite Nayanar Appar. This place is also known as Nandikecchuram. Nandeesvarar Temple in Tamil Nadu is also called as Nandhikechuram. Two places are referred as Nandivanam. In an article in the journal entitled Kumarakubaran, April 1972, Nandivanam has been referred as Vaippu Thalam. In the article V.T.Sengalvarayapillai says that Nandikecchuram might have become Nandivanam. R. P. Sethu Pillai says that the Shiva temple which is found on the Nandhi Hills is known as Nandikecchuram.

== Presiding deity ==
The presiding deity in the garbhagriha, represented by the lingam, is known as Nandeesvarar.

== Specialities ==
So many ancient Shiva temples are found in Nandhi Hills. In Karnataka, Veerashaiva gave more importance to the worship of nandhi.

== Location ==
The temple in Nandhi Hills can be reached from Mysore.
