= Makothai Mahadevar Temple, Kodungallur =

Hindu temple in Thrissur district, Kerala

Makothai Mahadevar Temple is a Hindu temple dedicated to the deity Shiva, located at Kodungallur in Thrissur district of Kerala, India.

== Vaippu Sthalam ==
It is one of the shrines of the Vaippu Sthalams sung by Tamil Saivite Nayanars Appar and Sundarar.

== Presiding deity ==
The presiding deity in the garbhagriha, is represented by the lingam is known as Makothai Mahadevar.

== Specialities ==
Kodungallur was the capital city of Cheras. This place is also known as "Makothai". Very near to this place, Thiruvanchikualam is found, where there is also a Shiva temple. In the east of the shrine of the goddess, the Kannagi temple of Cenkuttuvan is found.

== Location ==
This place is located at a distance of 40 km. from Thrissur.
