= Choleesvarar Temple, Mulanur =

Choleesvarar Temple, Mulanur is a Siva temple in Mulanur in Tiruppur district in Tamil Nadu, India.

== Vaippu Sthalam ==
It is one of the shrines of the Vaippu Sthalams sung by Tamil Saivite Nayanar Sundarar.

== Presiding deity ==
The presiding deity is known as Choleesvarar . The Goddess is known as Soundaranayaki.

== Other Shrines ==
Shrines of Vinayaka, Subramania with his consorts Valli and Deivanai, Surya, Bairava and Nataraja are found in this temple.
