= Adhilingesvarar Temple, Pannur =

Shiva temple in Tamil Nadu, India

Adhilingesvarar Temple, Pannur is a Siva temple in Mayiladuthurai district in Tamil Nadu (India).

== Vaippu Sthalam ==
It is one of the shrines of the Vaippu Sthalams sung by Tamil Saivite Nayanar Sundarar.

== Presiding deity ==
The presiding deity is Adhilingesvarar. The Goddess is known as Akilandesvari.

== Other Shrines ==
Very near to the temple, Sangili Veeran shrine is found. At the right side shrine of the Goddess is found.

== Location ==
It is situated near Pavakkudi in Mayiladuthurai-Kollumangudi-Karaikkal road.
