= Agastisvarar Temple, Killukudi =

Shiva temple in Tamil Nadu, India

Agastisvarar Temple is a Siva temple in Killukudi in Nagapattinam district in Tamil Nadu (India).

== Vaippu Sthalam ==
It is one of the shrines of the Vaippu Sthalams sung by Tamil Saivite Nayanar Sundarar.

== Presiding deity ==
The presiding deity is Agastisvarar. The Goddess is known as Sivakamasundari.

== Location ==
The temple is located in Kilvelur-Kacchinam road. This place is also known as Killikudi.
