= Suttharathnesvarar Temple, Urraththur =

Temple in Tamil Nadu, India

Suttharathnesvarar Temple, Uttathur, is a Siva temple in Uttathur near Siruganur in Lalgudi in Trichy District in Tamil Nadu (India).

== Vaippu Sthalam ==
It is one of the shrines of the Vaippu Sthalams sung by Tamil Saivite Nayanar Appar.

== Presiding deity ==
The presiding deity is known as Suttharathnesvarar . His consort is known as Akilandeswari.

== Speciality ==
During the Tamil month of Masi on 12th, 13th and 14th days the rays of Sun falls on the presiding deity
