= Thalikkulanathar Temple, Thanjavur =

Shiva temple in Tamil Nadu, India

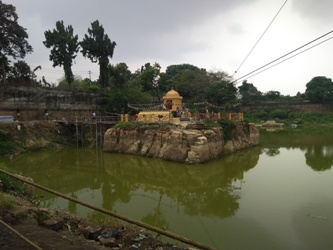
Temple in the midst of tank in Sivaganga Park

Thalikkulanathar Temple is a Hindu temple dedicated to the deity Shiva, located at Thanjavur in Thanjavur district, Tamil Nadu, India.

== Vaippu Sthalam ==
It is one of the shrines of the Vaippu Sthalams sung by Tamil Saivite Nayanar Appar. As this temple is in Thanjavur and had a tank this temple is known as Thanjai Thalikkulam.

== Presiding deity ==
The presiding deity in the garbhagriha, represented by the lingam, is known as Thalikkulanathar. He is also known as Rudrakodeeswarar.

== Specialities ==
In the Tevaram of Appar (6-51-6) there is reference about this temple. In Thiruveezhimizhalai, this temple has been referred.

== Structure ==
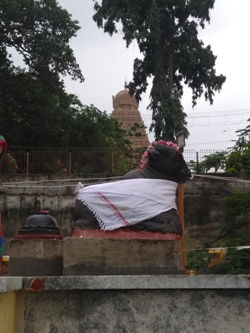
Bali peetam and Nandhi, At the background, the vimana of the Brihadisvara Temple

The temple is found in the middle of the tank. The shrine of the deity could be seen from the bank of the tank. Earlier there was no bali peetam and nandhi. This temple is also known as Sivalingaswamy temple. The Kumbhabhishekham of the temple was held on 10 November 2019. Now bali peetam and nandhi were set up.

== Location ==
The temple is located in the main road in Thanjavur Sivaganga Park, next to Big Temple. At the entrance of the park an arch is found. Through the arch one can reach the temple which is found in the middle of the tank, near the ferry or boat house. Through winch or through boat this temple could be reached.

== Photogallery ==
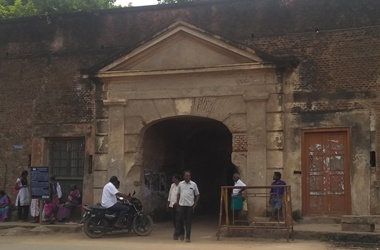
Entrance to Sivaganga Park

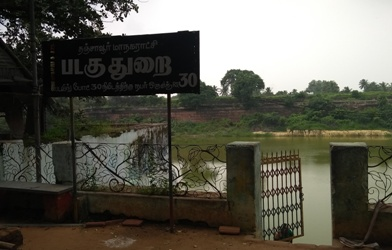
Entrance to ferry

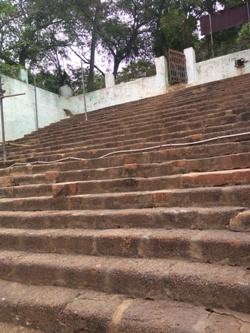
Steps from ferry

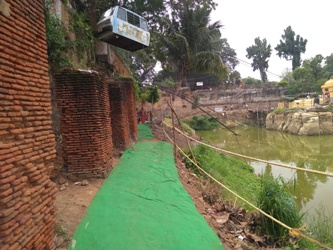
The path around the temple

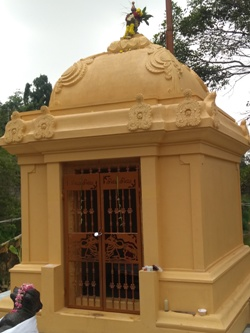
Shrine of presiding deity

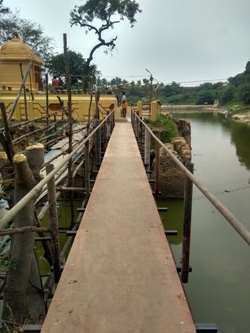
The connecting link to temple

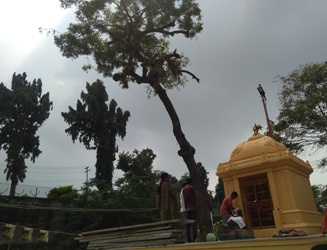
Full view of the temple
