= Kailasanathar Temple, Thandankorai =

Shiva temple in Tamil Nadu, India

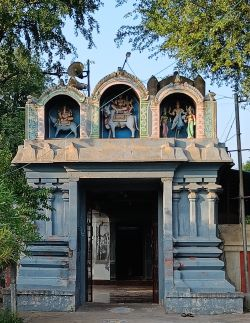
Temple entrance

Kailasanathar Temple is a Hindu temple dedicated to the deity Shiva, located at Thanjavur in Thanjavur district, India.

== Vaippu Sthalam ==
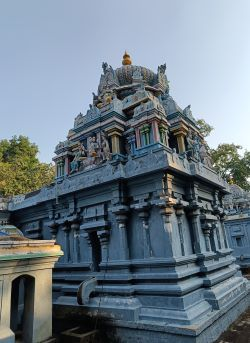
Vimana of the presiding deity

In Thandankorai Mummoorti Vinayaka temple, samadhi of Satsit Anandha Siddha, Ur Idaicchiamman Temple, Kailasanathar Temple and Kothandaramar Temple are found. Of them Kailasanathar is one of the shrines of the Vaippu Sthalams sung by Tamil Saivite Nayanar Sundarar. It was called as Thandangurai earlier.

== Presiding deity ==
The presiding deity in the garbhagriha, represented by the lingam, is known as Kailasanathar. The Goddess is known as Sarvalokanayaki.

== Specialities ==
Thandankorai is inhabited by large number of vedic scholars. They performed several yagas. Of them Raghunatha Vajpayee known as Ayyappa Dikshitar has performed three Garuda vahanas. The Kumbhabhishekham of the temple was held on 8 June 2012.

== Structure ==
The temple has a beautiful nandhi mandapa. Facing south, it has an entrance. In the west stuccos of Shiva, Parvati are found sitting on rishaba. They are flanked by Vinayaka, Subramania with his consorts Valli and Deivanai. Vinayaka and Sunbramania are found with their vahanas mouse and peacock respectively. After the entrance, in the front mandapa the shrine of the Goddess is found. In the left, facing east, the shrine of the presiding deity is found. In the outer prakara shrines of Vinayaka, Subramania with his consorts Valli and Deivanai, Gajalakshmi, Chandikesvarar and Navagraha are found. The shrine of Navagraha is found in lotus shape. Very near to them nandhi mandapa is found.

== Location ==
The temple is located in the main road in Thanjavur-Kumbakonam road, next to Manankorai, at a distance of 13 km from Thanjavur and in Kumbakonam-Thanjavur road, next to Ayyampet.
