= Chidambaresvarar Temple, Kotlambakkam =

Shiva temple in Cuddalore district, Tamil Nadu, India

Chidambaresvarar Temple is a Hindu temple dedicated to the deity Shiva, located at Kotlambakkam in Cuddalore district in Tamil Nadu, India.

== Vaippu Sthalam ==
It is one of the shrines of the Vaippu Sthalams sung by Tamil Saivite Nayanar Appar and Sundarar.

== Presiding deity ==
The presiding deity in the garbhagriha is represented by the lingam known as Chidambaresvarar. The Goddess is known as Sivakamasundari. Shrines of Vinayaka, Lakshmi, Subramania, Vishnu and Arunachalesvarar are found in this temple. Sculptures of Brahma, Dakshinamurthy, Surya and Bairava are also found.

== Specialities ==
Now this place is known as Kotlambakkam. Kodal refers to a flower. As it was found here this place was known by the name. Earlier this place was known as Sitthandi Madam, Sitthatha Madam and Kodalambakkam. In order not to put his feet on Tiruvathikai, Sundarar made a halt at a Matha known as Sitthavadam. This Matha was found in the west of the temple. When he was sleeping, Lord Shiva, as an old man came and laid down keeping his legs on Sundarar. Later he realised it was the Lord Shiva. As the Lord put his feet on his head, he was blessed.

== Renovation ==
This temple was built during 9th century CE. From an inscription it is found that Kopperunsinga Kadavarayan of Senthamangalam who ruled during 13th century CE, converted the garbhagriha into granite structure during his 24th regnal year (1267). Inscriptions of 15th century and 16 century are also found in this temple. This is to be renovated shortly.

== Location ==
It is very near to Panruti. This temple is located at Panruti-Thiruvennainallur-Tirukkovilur road, near Pudupet.

== Pradosham ==
Pradosham is being held in this temple.
