= Karchapeswarar Temple =

Temple in Tamil Nadu, India

Coordinates: 12.838185°N 79.701247°E

Karchapeswarar Temple is a Hindu temple located in the town of Kanchipuram in Tamil Nadu, India.

== Vaippu Sthalam ==
In Kaccippalathali more than one temple of Kancheepuram has been referred as the Vaippu Sthalams by Tamil Saivite Nayanar Appar. They are as under:

- Kaccapesam, Kailayam and Kayokaranam
- Tirumetrazhi, Onakanthanthazhi, Tirukamakottai and Kacchineri Karikkadu.

== Kaccapesam ==
The presiding deity of Kaccapesam is known as Karchapeswarar or Kaccapesvarar.

== Folklore ==
According to popular folklore, Vishnu is believed to have worshipped Shiva in the form of kurma (tortoise). The other name given to the temple is Kachipedu in some inscriptions. The temple is adjacent to the Kanthakottam temple. The temples was constructed by the Pallavas and renovated by Vijayanagar kings.

== Nearest Hindu Temple ==
- Arulmigu Thirumagaraleeswar Temple, Magaral

== Gallery ==
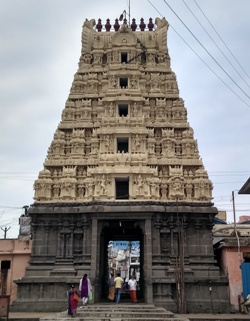
Rajagopuram

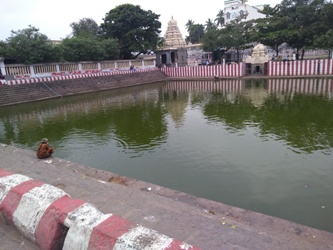
Temple tank

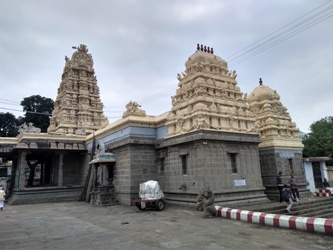
Inner gopura and other shrines

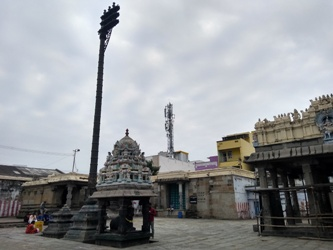
Balipeeta, Flagpost and Nandhi mandapa in front of the shrine
