= Nagesvarar Temple, Valarpuram =

Siva temple in Tamil Nadu, India

Nagesvarar Temple is a Siva temple in Valarpuram in Vellore district in Tamil Nadu (India).

== Religious Significance ==
It is believed that Adisesha worshipped Shiva in this temple. The temple is more than 1,000 years old. The presiding deity is called Nageswarar and is housed in the sanctum in the form of Lingam. Dakshinamoorthy, Vinayaga, Vishnu, Brahma and Durga are the Koshta Idols located around the sanctum walls. Mother is called as Sornavalli. She is housed in a separate shrine. There are shrines for Agni Bhairavar, Sekkizhar, Naalvar, Vinayaga, Viswanathar, Subramanya, Navagrahas and Mahalakshmi in the Temple premises. Theertham associated with this Temple is Sanghu Theertham. It is located just opposite to the temple. It is believed that the Theertham was in the shape of a conch (Sanghu), but due to later modifications, it got changed to its current shape. Sthala Vriksham is Vilvam Tree. There are inscriptions belonged to Sundara Pandya talks about his contribution to this Temple. As per the inscription, presiding deity was called asValaikulathu Nageswaramudaiyar.

== Vaippu Sthalam ==
It is one of the shrines of the Vaippu Sthalams sung by Tamil Saivite Nayanar Appar.

== Presiding deity ==
The presiding deity is known as Nagesvarar. The Goddess is known as Sornavalli.

== Speciality ==
From the inscriptions found in this temple that a Pandya king known has donated for this temple. The name of this temple is mentioned as Valaikulattu Nagesvaramudayar in the inscriptions.
