= Ezhumesvaramudayar Temple, Koyirkkulam =

Shiva temple in Tamil Nadu, India

Ezhumesvaramudayar Temple is a Hindu temple dedicated to the deity Shiva, located at Koyirkkulam in Nagapattinam district, Tamil Nadu, India.

== Vaippu Sthalam ==
It is one of the shrines of the Vaippu Sthalams sung by Tamil Saivite Nayanar Appar. This place is also known as Thalikkulam, Kovilkulam and Koyirkulam.

== Presiding deity ==
The presiding deity in the garbhagriha, represented by the lingam, is known as Ezhumesvaramudayar. The Goddess is known as Palinum Nanmozhiyal.

== Structure ==
The temple is in the shape of vavval nethi mandapa. There are shrines of Vinayaka, Subramania, Surya, Bairava and Sanisvara.

== Location ==
The temple is located at 4th Setthi in Thiruthuraipoondi-Vedaranyam road, next to Ayakkaranpulam and Panchanathikkulam. This place is opened for worship from 8.00 a.m. to 11.00 a.m. and 5.00 p.m. to 7.00 p.m.
