= Rudrakodisvarar Temple, Thenkodi =

Shiva temple in Tamil Nadu, India

Religion
- Affiliation: Hinduism
- District: Tiruvarur
- Deity: Lord Shiva,

Location
- Location: Thenkodi
- State: Tamil Nadu
- Country: India

Architecture
- Type: Dravidian architecture

Rudrakodisvarar Temple is a Hindu temple dedicated to the deity Shiva, located at Thenkodi in Tiruvarur district, Tamil Nadu, India.

== Vaippu Sthalam ==
It is one of the shrines of the Vaippu Sthalams sung by Tamil Saivite Nayanar Sambandar. The west part of the place is known Panchanathikkulam Mel Setthi, the east part is known as Panchanathikkulam Kil Setthi and the middle part is known as Panchanathikkulam Nadu Setthi.

== Presiding deity ==
The presiding deity in the garbhagriha, represented by the lingam, is known as Rudrakodisvarar, Thenkodinathar and Dhanuskodinathar. The Goddess is known as Madurabashini and Tiripurasundari.

== Specialities ==
As five rivers including Semman Nathi are found nearby, this place is known as Panchanathikulam. Sambandar in his Tevaram praises the deity as "Aroor Thillaiambalam". So many inscriptions are found in this temple. This temple is also referred as Kodikkarai temple. It is also said that Thenkodinathar, the presiding deity of the temple was worshipped by Siddhas. It is said that one day Kodi would be taken away by the sea and on that occasion the deity would be kept at Panchanathikkulam and a temple would be built at that place. During Tamil month of Vaikasi, festival is held in the temple.

== Structure ==
At the entrance, in the facade Shiva is found sitting on his vahana along with his consort. The temple has prakara. In the prakara shrines of Vinayaka, Subramania, Surya, Bairava, Nadhalinga, Chandra and Saneesvarar. At the right side of the shrine of the presiding deity, the shrine of the goddess is found. Nataraja shrine is found without the deity. The processional deities belonging to this temple is kept in Tiruvarur. In the kosta, only Dakshinamurti sculpture is found. In 1970 Kumbabishegam was done to this temple.

== Location ==
The temple is located at Panchanathikulam east. This place can be reached from Thiruthuraipoondi via Maruthur Irattaikkadiyadi.
