= Trilokanathar Temple, Irumpudhalai =

Temple in Tamil Nadu, India

Trilokanathar Temple, Irumpudhalai is a Shiva temple 5 km from Thirukkarugavur in Thanjavur District, Tamil Nadu, India.

It is one of the shrines of the Vaippu Sthalams sung by Tamil Saivite Nayanar Appar. The presiding deity is known as Trilokanathar. His consort is known as Trilokanayagi.
