= Karapurisvarar Temple, Karapuram =

Siva temple in Vellore district, Tamil Nadu, India

Karapurisvarar Temple is a Siva temple in Karapuram in Vellore district in Tamil Nadu (India).

== Vaippu Sthalam ==
It is one of the shrines of the Vaippu Sthalams sung by Tamil Saivite Nayanar Appar.

== Presiding deity ==
The presiding deity is known as Karapurisvarar. The Goddess is known as Abithagujalambal.

== Location ==
This temple is located at Tirupparkkadal, also known as Karapuam, next to Kaverippakkam on Kancheepuram-Vellore road.
