= Paranjothi Easwarar Temple, Thanjakkoor =

Hindu temple in Sivagangai district, Tamil Nadu, India

Sri Paranjothi Easwarar Temple is a Hindu temple to the deity Shiva at Thanjakkoor Village in Sivagangai district, Tamil Nadu, India.

== Vaippu Sthalam ==
It is one of the shrines of the Vaippu Sthalams sung by Tamil Saivite Nayanar Sundarar. This place is also known as Adhi Vilvavana Kshetra, referring to the age old place which had many vilva trees.

== Presiding deity ==
The presiding deity in the garbhagriha, represented by the lingam, is known as Paranjothi Easwarar. His consort is known as Gnanambikai. He is also known as Rudrakodeeswarar.
