= Tripuranthakeswara Temple, Tripuranthakam =

Tripuranthakeswara Temple is a Hindu temple dedicated to the deity Shiva, located at Tripuranthakam in Markapuram district, Andhra Pradesh, India.

== Location ==
Tripurantakam is located on the national highway from Guntur to Srisailam. Sri Bala Tripura Sundari Ammavari temple is located at a distance of 2 km from Tripurantakam village. Sri Tripurantakeswara Swamy is on the top of a hill. Goddess Sri Bala Tripura Sundari is located down the hill, in the midst of a tank. According to the temple legend, Sri Bala Tripurasundari ammavari temple is the eastern gateway of Srisailam Sri Bramaramba Mallikarjuna swamy temple.

== Presiding deity ==
The presiding deity in the garbhagudi, represented by the lingam, is known as Sri Bala Tripurantakeswara.

== Vaippu Sthalam ==
It is one of the shrines of the Vaippu Sthalams sung by Tamil Saivite Nayanar Appar. This temple is very near to Lakshmi Narasimha Temple. This is also one of the Sakthi Peetams.
