= Dakshinakokarnesvarar Temple, Pulivalam =

Shiva temple in Tiruvarur district, Tamil Nadu, India

- Dakshinakokarnesvarar Temple, Pulivalam, Tiruvarur district, Tamil Nadu

Religion
- Affiliation: Hinduism
- District: Tiruvarur
- Deity: Lord Shiva,

Location
- Location: Pulivalam
- State: Tamil Nadu
- Country: India
- Interactive map of Dakshinakokarnesvarar Temple, Pulivalam
- Coordinates: 10.7537°N 79.6369°E

Architecture
- Type: Dravidian architecture
- Elevation: 37.64 m (123 ft)

Dakshinakokarnesvarar Temple, Pulivalam is a Shiva temple in Pulivalam in Tiruvarur district in Tamil Nadu (India).

== Vaippu Sthalam ==
It is one of the shrines of the Vaippu Sthalams sung by Tamil Saivite Nayanar Appar. This place is found in Thiruvarur-Thiruthuraipoondi road at a distance of 3 km from Pulivalam.

== Presiding deity ==
The presiding deity is Dakshinakokarnesvarar. The Goddess is known as Anandavalli.

== Other places ==
There are also two other places with this name in Tiruchirappalli district. They are in Manachanallur-Thuraiyur road and near Jeeyapuram at Tiruchirappalli.
