= Seeyathamangai Ayavandeeswarar Temple =

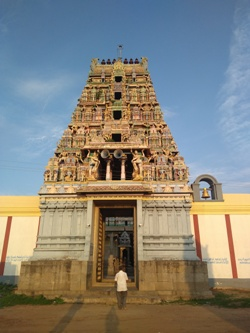
Ramanathaswami Temple

Seeyathamangai Ayavandeeswarar Temple (Tamil: சீயாத்தமங்கை அயவந்தீசுவரர் கோயில்) is a Hindu temple located at Seeyathamangai in Nagapattinam district, Tamil Nadu, India. Seeyathamangai is also written as Siyathamangai and Tiruchaathamangai. The temple is dedicated to Shiva, as the moolavar presiding deity, in his manifestation as Ayavantheeswarar. His consort, Parvati, is known as Malarkkannammai.

== Significance ==
It is one of the shrines of the 275 Paadal Petra Sthalams - Shiva Sthalams glorified in the early medieval Tevaram poems by Tamil Saivite Nayanar Tirugnanasambandar. It is one of the shrines of the Vaippu Sthalams sung by Tamil Saivite Nayanar Appar.

== Literary mention ==
Tirugnanasambandar describes the feature of the deity as:

கங்கையோர் வார்சடைமே லடை யப்புடை யேகமழும்

மங்கையோ டொன்றிநின்றம் மதிதான் சொல் லாவதொன்றே
சங்கையில் லாமறையோ ரவர் தாந்தொழு சாத்தமங்கை

அங்கையிற் சென்னைவைத்தா யயவந்தி யமர்ந்தவனே.

== Gallery ==
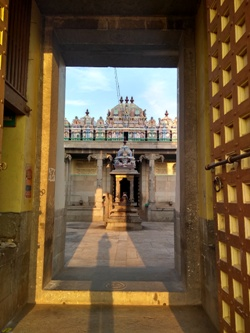
Entrance and Nandi mandapa

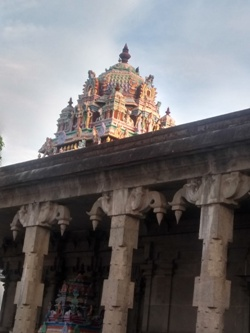
Vimana of the presiding deity

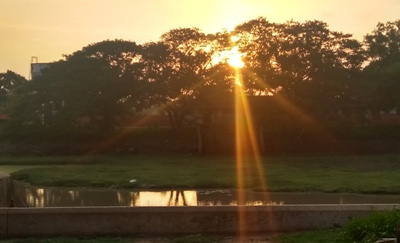
Tank in front of the temple

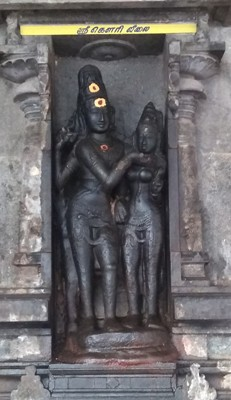
Sculpture in the kosta
