= Asaladeebesvarar Temple, Mohanur =

Hindu temple in Namakkal district

Asaladeepeswarar Temple
- Asaladeepeswarar Temple, Mohanur, Namakkal district, Tamil Nadu

Religion
- Affiliation: Hinduism
- District: Namakkal
- Deity: Asaladeepeswarar
- Festival: Maha Shivaratri

Location
- Location: Mohanur
- State: Tamil Nadu
- Country: India
- Interactive map of Asaladeepeswarar Temple
- Coordinates: 11.0519°N 78.1368°E

Architecture
- Type: Dravidian architecture
- Completed

Specifications
- Temple: One
- Elevation: 137.25 m (450 ft)

Asaladeebesvarar Temple is a Hindu temple dedicated to the deity Shiva, located at Mohanur in Namakkal district in Tamil Nadu, India.

== Vaippu Sthalam ==
It is one of the shrines of the Vaippu Sthalams sung by Tamil Saivite Nayanar Appar.

== Presiding deity ==
The presiding deity is represented by the lingam known as Asaladeebesvarar. The Goddess is known as Maduraveni.

== Specialities ==
There is reference about this Shiva temple as Kumari Kongu, found on the banks of Kaveri, in Kshetrakovai of Appar. As the Shiva of Mohanur is also known as Kumarisar, this place might have got the name. Kumari Kongu and Kongu Kumaritthurai are one and the same and now known as Mohanur. There is a story stating that Muruga, in search of divine mango went to so many places. During search Shiva and Parvati found Muruga here and this place was earlier called as Mahanur, referring to Son (Mahan in Tamil) and Town (Ur in Tamil). It is said that from Under the feet of the presiding deity a small fountain starts and reaches Kaveri. During Aadi Perukku, devotees worship the deity, after having a sacred bath in Kaveri.

== Structure ==
The temple is found with one prakaram. The presiding deity is facing west while the goddess is facing east. In the prakaram, shrines of Vinayaka, Subramania, Nataraja, Kali and 63 Nayanars are also found. In spite of heavy wind the lamp inside the shrine will shine continuously.

== Location ==
Mohanur is located at a distance of 17 km from Namakkal. The temple is situated at a distance of 2 km from Mohanur bus stand, at the north of Kaveri. This temple is opened for worship from 7.30 a.m. to 12.00 a.m. and 5.00 p.m. to 8.30 p.m.
