= Kailasanathar Temple, Tirumetrazhigai =

Temple in Tamil Nadu, India

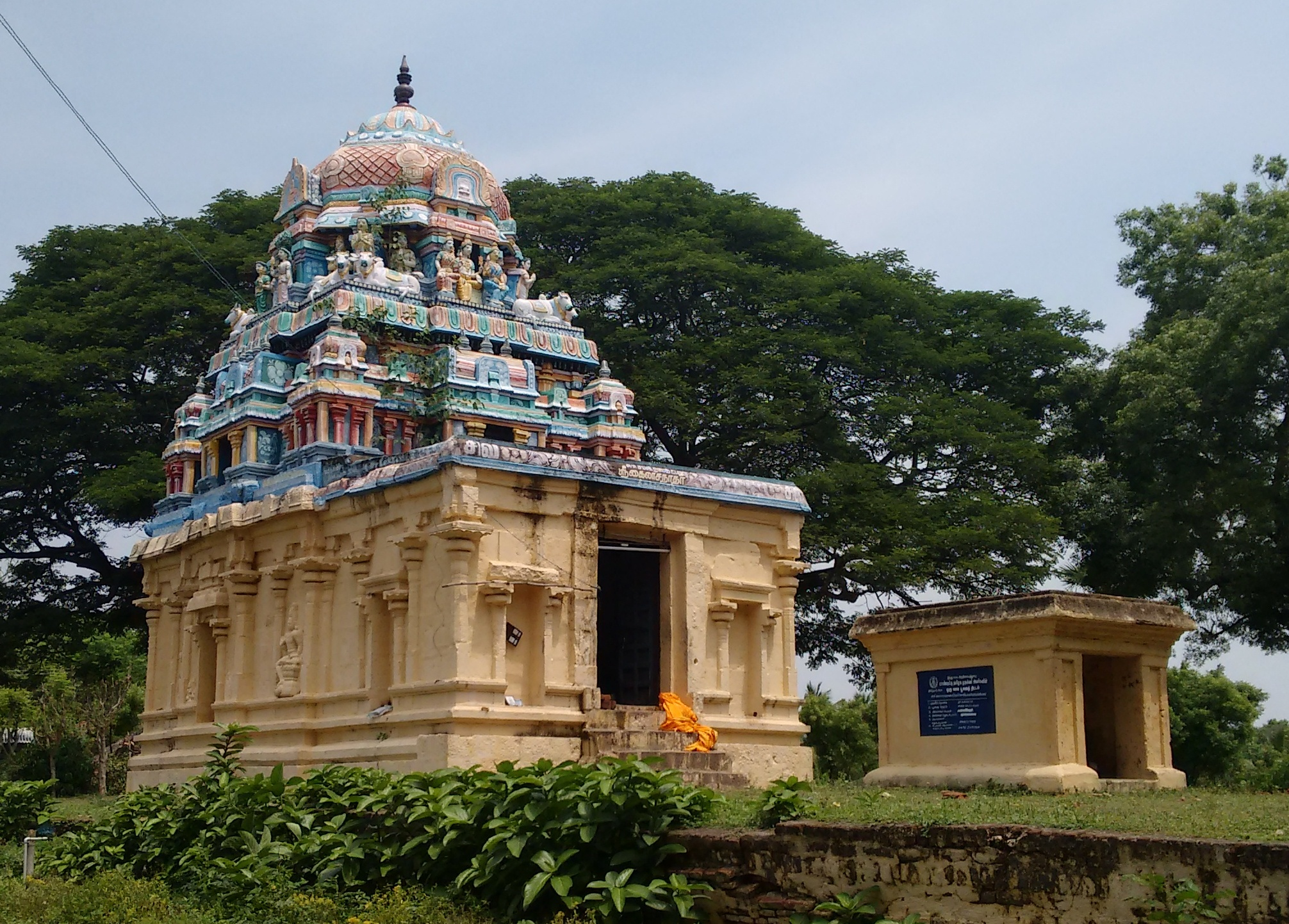
Kailasanathar temple

Kailasanathar Temple, Tirumetrazhigai, is a Siva temple near Patteeswaram in Thanjavur District in Tamil Nadu (India).

== Vaippu Sthalam ==
It is one of the shrines of the Vaippu Sthalams sung by Tamil Saivite Nayanar Sundarar.

== Presiding deity ==
The presiding deity is known as Kailasanathar. His consort is known as Sabalanayagi.

== Shrines ==
In front of the sanctum santorum Surya, Chandikesvarar, Vinayaka, Bairava and Sabalayanagi are found. Nandhi and balipeeta are found in front of the temple. Sculptures are found in the kosta.

== Photogallery ==
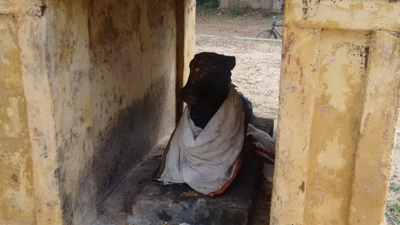

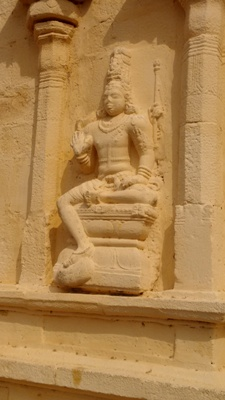

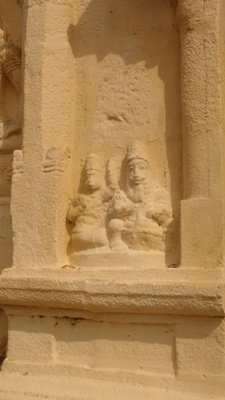

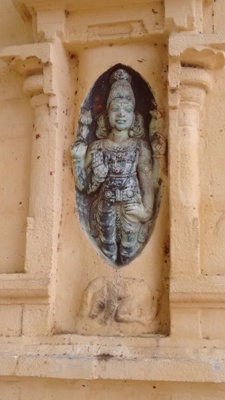

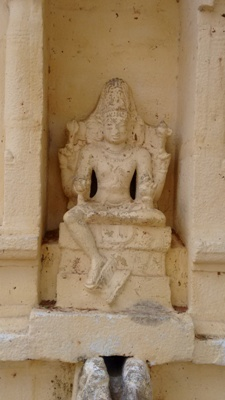

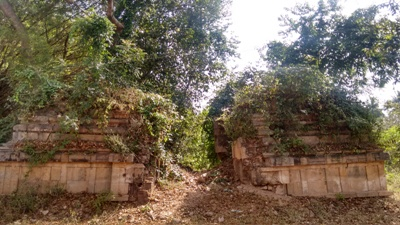
