= Kailasanathar Temple, Brahmadesam =

Temple in Tamil Nadu, India

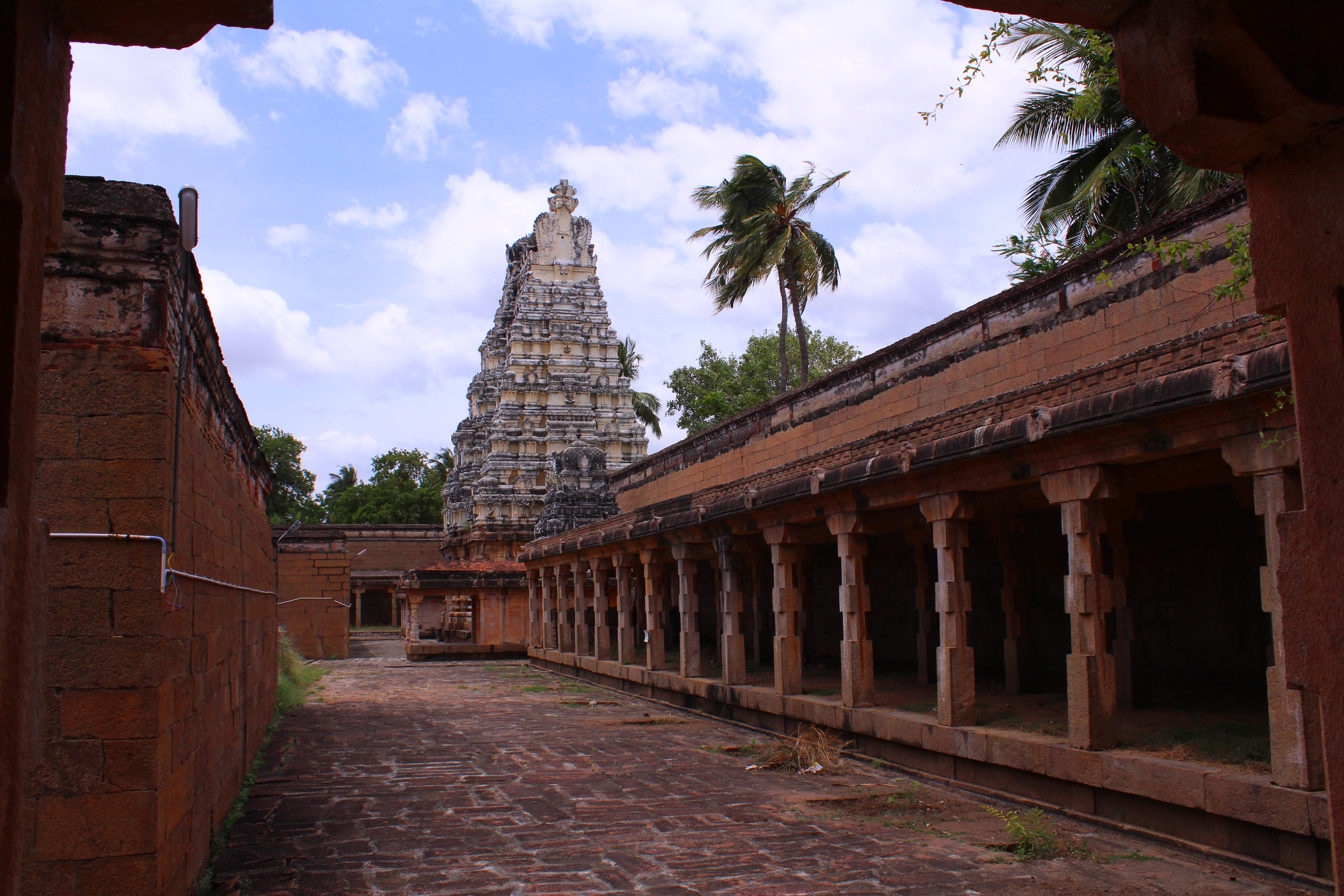

Kailasanathar Temple, Brahmadesam, also known as Ayaniccuram is a Siva temple in Ambasamudram Taluk of Thirunelveli District in Tamil Nadu (India). It is one of the shrines of the Vaippu Sthalams sung by Tamil Saivite Nayanar Appar.

== Structure of the temple ==
The presiding deity of the temple is known as Kailasanathar. His consort is known as Periya Nayaki Ammal. Other shrines in this temple are Vinayaka, Subramania and Sarasvathi.

== Pujas and festivals ==
Pujas are held four times daily. Panguni Uthiram festival is celebrated in this temple.
