= Pasupatheesvarar Temple, Nallavur =

Shiva temple in Tamil Nadu, India

Pasupatheesvarar Temple, is a Hindu temple dedicated to the deity Shiva, located at Nallavur in Mayiladuthurai district, Tamil Nadu, India.

== Vaippu Sthalam ==
It is one of the shrines of the Vaippu Sthalams sung by Tamil Saivite Nayanar Appar. The place was known as Nallarrur.

== Presiding deity ==
The presiding deity in the garbhagriha, represented by the lingam, is known as Pasupatheesvarar. The Goddess is known as Soundara Nayaki.

== Specialities ==
Lord Shiva can be worshipped in this place and other places such as Arur, Perumpatrapuliyur, Peravur, Naraiyur, Nallur, Nallatrur, Setrur, Naraiyur, Uraiyur, Othur, Utrathur, Alappur, Omampuliyur, Otriyur, Thuraiyur, Thozhur and Thudaiyur. The devotees who worship the Shiva in these places will never get hardship in their life. Sankada Saturti, Pradhosham, Navaratri, Tiruvathirai, Karthikai Somavara and other festivals are held in this temple.

== Structure ==
The temple has a gopura. After going through the entrance in the right side shrine of Sanisvaran is found. After worshipping Dwara Vinayaka, Shiva can be worshipped. In the prakara Vinayaka is found. The goddess is found in standing posture in the shrine. The Kumbhabhishekham of the temple was held in 1990. The shrine of Nataraja, Bhairava, Surya, Sambandar, Appar, Sundarar, Srinivasa Perumal and Mahalakshmi are found in this temple. At the rear side of the temple, temple tirtta Esanya Tirtta is found. Shrine of Srinivasa Perumal is found at the rear side of the shrine of the presiding deity.

== Location ==
The temple is located at Nallavur in Kumbakonam to Kollumangudi road at the right side of the bus stop at Nallavur. After crossing the bridge the temple can be reached. This temple also can be reached a distance of 6 km. from Thiruvavaduthurai. The temple is situated at a distance of 9.5 km. from Thiruneelakkudi temple. Daily one time puja is held in this temple.
