= Agastheeswaram Agastheeswarar Temple =

Hindu temple

Agasteeswaram Agasteeswarar Temple
- Agasteeswarar Temple, Agastheeswaram, Kanyakumari, Tamil Nadu

Religion
- Affiliation: Hinduism
- District: Kanyakumari
- Deity: Agasteeswarar
- Festival: Maha Shivaratri

Location
- Location: Agastheeswaram
- State: Tamil Nadu
- Country: India
- Interactive map of Agasteeswaram Agasteeswarar Temple
- Coordinates: 8.1103°N 77.5242°E

Architecture
- Type: Dravidian architecture

Specifications
- Temple: One
- Elevation: 39.69 m (130 ft)

Agastheeswaram Agastheeswarar Temple (அகத்தீச்சுரம் அகத்தீசுவரர் கோயில்) is a Hindu temple located at Vadugan Patru in Kanyakumari district of Tamil Nadu, India. The presiding deity is Shiva. He is called as Agastheeswarar. His consort is known as Amuthavalli.

== Location ==
This temple is located at about 100 metres from Vadugan Patru bus stop, 1 km from Kottaram and 5 km from Kanyakumari.

== Significance ==
It is one of the shrines of the Vaippu Sthalams sung by Tamil Saivite Nayanar Appar. Appar and Sage Agasthia with his wife Lopamudra worshipped the presiding deity of the temple.

== Another Agastheeswarar Temple ==
There is another temple in the name of Agastheeswar Temple dedicated to Shiva, in the town of Agathiyampalli, Nagapattinam district in Tamil Nadu, India.
