= Soundaresvarar Temple, Neduvasal =

Temple in Tamil Nadu, India

Soundaresvarar Temple is a Hindu temple dedicated to the deity Shiva, located at village Neduvasal in Sembanarkoil block, Mayiladuthurai district, Tamil Nadu, India.

== Vaippu Sthalam ==
It is one of the shrines of the Vaippu Sthalams sung by Tamil Saivite Nayanars Sambandar and Appar. There is also another place in this name in Aranthangi taluk of Tamil Nadu. This place was also known as Neduvayil.

== Presiding deity ==
The presiding deity in the garbhagriha, represented by the lingam, is known as Soundaresvarar. The Goddess is known as Akilandesvari.

== Specialities ==
Everything will be bestowed upon the devotees who worship Shiva in this place and other places such as Annanvayil, Neithalvayil, Alavayil, Punavayil, Kudavayil, and Gunavayil. Local people have a faith that if the Sivalinga is filled with water, there would be rain in that place. For want of rain, there is a festival during which the processional deity would go around the town. In the Kongarayan mandapa Gubera Vinayaka is found.

== Structure ==
This temple has a gopura. Separate shrines are found for the presiding deity and the goddess. Shrines of Vinayaka, Subramania, Dakshinamurthy and Chandikesvarar are found in this temple. The Vinayaka of this temple was found from a tank nearby. Two songs praising the deity are found as inscriptions in this temple.

== Location ==
The temple is located 25 km from Mayiladuthurai. Neduvasal is located at Mayiladuthurai-Sembanarkoil-Mematthur-Sankarankoil route town bus facilities are available. Through Mayiladuthurai-Akkur road also this place can be reached, from Sembanarkoil at a distance of 11 km. southeast. In At Sankranpandal in Mayiladuthurai-Porayar route, this place can be reached by auto. The temple is opened for worship from 8.30 a.m. to 12.30 a.m. and 4.30 p.m. to 8.30 p.m.
