= Rajendracholiswarar Temple, Ilaiyankudi =

Temple in Tamil Nadu, India

Rajendracholiswarar Temple, Ilaiyankudi, is a Siva temple in Ilaiyankudi in Ramanathapuram District in Tamil Nadu (India). This place is also known as Indira Avathara Nallur.

== Vaippu Sthalam ==
It is one of the shrines of the Vaippu Sthalams sung by Tamil Saivite Nayanar Sundarar.

== Presiding deity ==
The presiding deity in the garbhagriha, represented by the lingam, is known as Rajendracholiswarar. His consort is known as Gnanambikai. There is a separate shrine for Ilaiyankudi Mara Nayanar. This is the birth place of the Ilayankudi Maranar. Temple tree of this temple is vilva. Temple tirtta is known as Deiva Pushkarani.

== Festivals ==
Maha Shivaratri, Kanda Sasti and Karthikai festivals are held in this temple. The temple is opened for worship from 6.00 to 11.00 a.m. and 4.30 to 8.30 p.m.

== Location ==
It is situated in Madurai-Ramanathapuram road, next to Paramakudi, Emaneswaram, Kumarakurichi and Tiruvudayarpuram. The temple is located at Maranayanar street in Ilaiyankudi.
