= Natanapureesvarar Temple, Thantanthottam =

Shiva temple in Tamil Nadu, India

Natanapureesvarar Temple is a Hindu temple dedicated to the deity Shiva, located at Thantanthottam in Thanjavur district, Tamil Nadu, India.

== Vaippu Sthalam ==
It is one of the shrines of the Vaippu Sthalams sung by Tamil Saivite Nayanar Sundarar. This place is also known as Nartanapuram and Thandavapuri.

== Presiding deity ==
The presiding deity in the garbhagriha, represented by the lingam, is known as Natanapureesvarar. The Goddess is known as Sivakamsundari.

== Specialities ==
Very near to this temple, a lingam is found. It is known as Agasteesvarar. During the time of the celestial wedding of Shiva and Parvati the north began to rise, while the south started to come down. In order the balance Shiva sent Agasthiar to South. As Agasthiar could not able to see the wedding of the Lord, he gave him a boon that Agasthiar would see the divine couple in wedding attire whenever he thought of them. This is one such place. After satisfying through the worship by Agasthiar, Shiva, along with his consort blessed him. 11 copper plates of Pallava period were found from this place. From these copper plates it is learnt that during the period of Pallavas and Cholas this place was in good state. In these copper plates there are references about Nandhivarma II, who ruled Kanchipuram. From inscriptions it is learnt that land was donated.

== Structure ==
The temple is having an entrance and is facing south. After the entrance, the front mandapa is found. The shrine of the presiding deity is facing east and the shrine of the Goddess is facing south. In the prakara, in the kosta, Dakshinamurti is found. In the west prakara, shrines of Vinayaka, Subramania with his consorts Valli and Durga are found. Temple tree is Vanni tree. Temple tirtta are Agasthiar Tirttam and Surya Tirttam. Every year, during the Tamil month of Vaikasi the celestial wedding of Shiva takes. Navagraha shrine is also found in this temple.

== Nataraja sculpture ==
In 1965, the Kanchi sage came to this place. It is said that a beautiful Nataraja sculpture, as found in Puthur and Sivapuram was found here and it was stolen in 1972. On the advice of the seer, a sculpture of Nataraja given by him was kept here.

== Location ==
The temple is located in Kumbakonam-Karaikal road, next to Thirunageswaram, at a distance of 4 km where a nameboard indicating the place could be found. From there after crossing Naduvakkarai, Pundarikapuram and Murukkangudi, this place can be reached. From Thirunageswaram also this place could be reached at a distance of 5 km. From Nachiyarkoil also road facility is available to this temple. This temple is opened for worship from 9.00 to 10.30 a.m. and 5.30 to 7.00 p.m.
