= Mokkaneesvarar Temple, Kulayagoundanputhur =

Shiva temple in Tamil Nadu, India

Mokkaneesvarar Temple is a Hindu temple dedicated to the deity Shiva, located at Kulayagoundanputhur in Coimbatore district, Tamil Nadu, India.

== Vaippu Sthalam ==
It is one of the shrines of the Vaippu Sthalams sung by Tamil Saivite Nayanar Sundarar.

== Presiding deity ==
The presiding deity in the garbhagriha, represented by the lingam, is known as Mokkaneesvarar. The Goddess is known as Meenakshi. The temple tree is vilva. Karthigai, Somavaram and Sivaratri are the festivals of the temple. The temple is opened for worship from 10.00 am to 12.00 noon.

== Specialities ==
Once two merchants to carry out their business. Of them one was a Shiva devotee.He used to do his daily routine work after worshipping Shiva. Another man who came with him made a trick and put some sand in a bag made him to think that it was a Linga. He told him that was the Linga and garlanded it. The devotee believed that it was Linga and started worshipping it. After completion of puja, the man who made the form told him that it was a bag containing sand. But to their surprise it became real linga. The bag which contains grams is known as 'Mokkani'. So the presiding deity is known as Mokkaneesvarar.

== Structure ==
The temple is having a small structure. The shrine of the goddess is facing south. In the front mandapa Manikkavacakar is found. To him puja is held. Siva Surya is found nearby. In the temple campus a dilapidated temple mandapa is found. In it Manikkavacakar is found in anjali mudra in sitting posture. Shrines of Chandikesvarar, Navagraha and Bairava are found. The Temple Vinayaka known as 'Muttha Vinayaka' or elder Vinayaka is also found. The temple which was sung by Sundarar was destroyed. Manikkavacakar in his Thiruvasagam refers to this place as "Mokkani Aruliya". On that basis the temple was rebuilt.

== Location ==
The temple is located on the road side, next to Thanneerpanthalpalayam 6 km from Kuttakam, at a distance of 1 km from Sevur in Avinashi-Anthiyur road. Nothing is found near the temple. Avinashi-Puliyampatti buses ply through Kulayagoundanputhur. The Kumbhabhishekham of the temple took place on 6 February 1968.
