= Chandramoulisvarar Temple, Arichandrapuram =

Shiva temple in Tamil Nadu, India

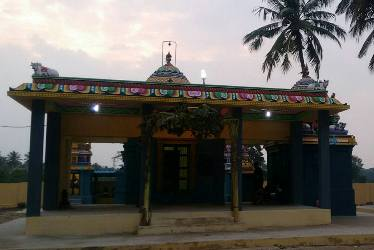
Arichandrapuram Chandramoulisvarar Temple

Chandramoulisvarar Temple, Arichandrapuram, also known as Arichandhiram is a Siva temple in near Pattisvaram near Kumbakonam in Thanjavur District in Tamil Nadu (India).

== Vaippu Sthalam ==
It is one of the shrines of the Vaippu Sthalams sung by Tamil Saivite Nayanar Appar.

== Presiding deity ==
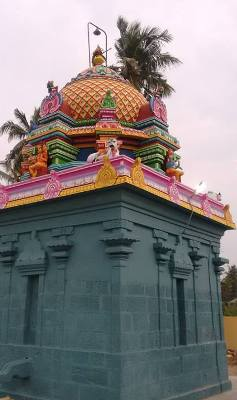
Vimana of the presiding deity

The presiding deity is known as Chandramoulisvarar. His consort is known as Soundaravalli. In the kosta of the presiding deity Dakshinamurthy is found. Surya, Chandra and Bairava are also found in this temple. Shrines of Vinayaka, Subramania with his consorts Valli and Deivanai, and Mahalakshmi are found.

== Kumbhabhishekham ==
The Kumbhabhishekham of this temple was held on 26 June 1980 and on 24 November 2017
