= Rudrakodisvarar Temple, Tirukalukundram =

Temple in Tamil Nadu, India

- Rudrakodisvarar Temple, Tirukalukundram, Chengalpattu, Tamil Nadu

Religion
- Affiliation: Hinduism
- District: Chengalpattu
- Deity: Rudrakodisvarar
- Festival: Maha Shivaratri

Location
- Location: Tirukalukundram
- State: Tamil Nadu
- Country: India
- Interactive map of Rudrakodisvarar Temple, Tirukalukundram
- Coordinates: 12°36′07″N 80°03′41″E

Architecture
- Type: Dravidian architecture

Specifications
- Temple: One
- Elevation: 54.35 m (178 ft)

Rudrakodisvarar Temple, Tirukalukundram is a Siva temple in Tirukalukundram in Chengalpattu District in Tamil Nadu, India. This temple is also known as Urutthiran Temple, Rudhran Temple and Ruthrankoil.

== Vaippu Sthalam ==
It is one of the shrines of the Vaippu Sthalams sung by Tamil Saivite Nayanar Appar.

== Presiding deity ==
The presiding deity is known as Rudrakodisvarar. His consort is known as Tiripurasundari.

== Shrines ==
The shrine of the presiding deity is facing east and the shrine of the goddess is facing south.
