= Madhyapurisvarar Temple, Paranjervazhi =

Temple in India

Madhyapurisvarar Temple, Paranjervazhi is a Siva temple in Erode district in Tamil Nadu (India).

== Vaippu Sthalam ==
It is one of the shrines of the Vaippu Sthalams sung by Tamil Saivite Nayanar Appar. Now, this place is known as Paranjervazhi.

== Presiding deity ==
The presiding deity is Madhyapurisvarar. The goddess is known as Sukundha Kunthalambikai.

== Location ==
The temple is situated in Paranjervazhi in Kangeyam-Chennimalai road, at a distance of 8 km from Natthakadayur.
