= Nandinadesvarar Temple, Poikainallur =

Shiva temple in Tamil Nadu, India

- Nandinaadhesvarar Temple, North Poigainallur, Nagapattinam, Tamil Nadu

Religion
- Affiliation: Hinduism
- District: Nagapattinam
- Deity: Nandinaadhesvarar
- Festival: Maha Shivaratri

Location
- Location: North Poigainallur
- State: Tamil Nadu
- Country: India
- Interactive map of Nandinadesvarar Temple, Poikainallur
- Coordinates: 10°43′59.5″N 79°50′25.1″E

Architecture
- Type: Dravidian architecture

Specifications
- Temple: One
- Elevation: 41.01 m (135 ft)

Nandinadesvarar Temple is a Siva temple in Poigainallur in Nagapattinam district in Tamil Nadu, India.

== Vaippu Sthalam ==
It is one of the shrines of the Vaippu Sthalams sung by Tamil Saivite Nayanar Appar.

== Presiding deity ==
The presiding deity is Nandinadesvarar. The Goddess is known as Soundaranayaki.

== Speciality ==
This place consists of North Poikainallur and South Poikainallur. North Poikainallur is the Vaippu Sthalam.
