= Mallikarjunar Temple, Dharmapuri =

Hindu Temple

Coordinates: 12°08′35″N 78°09′59″E

Mallikarjunar Temple is a Hindu temple dedicated to the deity Shiva, located at Dharmapuri in Dharmapuri district in Tamil Nadu, India.

== Vaippu Sthalam ==
It is one of the shrines of the Vaippu Sthalams sung by Tamil Saivite Nayanar Sundarar. The Fort which was known as Athiyamān Fort later became Athaman Fort. This temple is also known as Fort Temple, Kottai (Kottai means Fort) Easwaran Temple, Thakadur Kamatchi Temple and Kottai Sivan Temple.

== Presiding deity ==
The presiding deity in the garbhagriha is represented by the lingam known as Mallikarjunar . The Goddess is known as Kamatchi Ammai.

== Specialities ==
In this temple the samadhi of Siddhalingesvarar is found. The first worship is done to this shrine. In inscriptions the deity is known as Rajarajesvaramudayar. The shrine of the Goddess is found as carried by 18 elephants. She is known as Thakadur (referring to present Dharmapuri) Kamatchi. In other temples, the goddess could be seen in all days. But in this temple should could be found only one day in full form. On other days only her face could be found for worship. She is known as Sulini Raja Durga.

== Structure ==
Shiva is found in dancing posture in mahamandapa. Astathikbalakas are found there. The sculptures of the mandapa of the presiding deity is beautiful to look at. Yoga Narasimha is found here. At the left of the entrance Virabhadra is found. Bhairava, Surya, Surya are found in this temple. Shrines of Valampuri Ganesha, Subramania with his consorts Valli and Deivanai are also found here. In the kosta Vinayaka, Dakshinamurthy, Vishnu, Brahma and Durga are found.

== Location ==
Thakadur is known as present Dharmapuri. Some scholars refer the Thakaddur near Vedaranyam, as Thakadur. Temple is located in Dharmapuri Bus stand-Tiruppatur road, next to Milk depot, in left side.
