= Uthrapathisvarar Temple, Keelakadambur =

Temple in Tamil Nadu, India

Uthrapathisvarar Temple, Keelakadambur, is a Siva temple in Keelakadambur in Cuddalore District in Tamil Nadu (India). It is also known as Kadampai Ilangkoil.

== Vaippu Sthalam ==
It is one of the shrines of the Vaippu Sthalams sung by Tamil Saivite Nayanar Appar.

== Presiding deity ==
The presiding deity is known as Uthrapathisvarar. His consort is known as Soundaranayagi.

== Shrines ==
The temple is in a dilapidated condition. Two lingas and a nandhi are found outside the shrine.
