= Kampili Shiva Temple =

Kampili Shiva Temple is a Hindu temple dedicated to the deity Shiva, located at Kampili in Bellary district of Karnataka, India. It was built by Kampilideva, the last ruler of the Kampili kingdom.

== Vaippu Sthalam ==
It is one of the shrines of the Vaippu Sthalams sung by Tamil Saivite Nayanar Appar. This place is also known as Kambeeli. It is on the banks of Tungabadra. So many Shiva temples are found in this district.

== Presiding deity ==
The presiding deity in the garbhagriha, represented by the lingam, is known as Pampabathy and Viruppaseesvarar.The Goddess is known as Kempambal.The presiding deity was worshipped by Nesa Nayanar.

== Location ==
The temple is located at a distance of 35 km. from Hospet railway station. Through Hospet-Hampi route, this place can be reached.
