= Adi Kailasanathar Temple, Perundurai =

Shiva temple in Tamil Nadu, India

Adi Kailasanathar Temple is a Siva temple in Vadakkur in Pudukottai district in Tamil Nadu (India).

== Vaippu Sthalam ==
It is one of the shrines of the Vaippu Sthalams sung by Tamil Saivite Nayanar Appar. It is situated near Aranthangi. This place is found in Vadakkur, next to Avudaiyarkoil.

== Presiding deity ==
The presiding deity is Adi Kailasanathar. The Goddess is known as Sivakami Ammai.

== Other shrines ==
In the Prakaram shrines of ValampuriVinayaka, Subramania with his consorts Valli and Deivanai, Bairava, Chandra and Surya are found.
