= Rishabesvarar Temple, Sengam =

Shiva temple in Tamil Nadu, India

Rishabesvarar Temple is a Siva temple in Sengam in Tiruvannamalai district in Tamil Nadu (India).

== Vaippu Sthalam ==
It is one of the shrines of the Vaippu Sthalams sung by Tamil Saivite Nayanar Appar.

== Presiding deity ==
The presiding deity is known as Rishabesvarar. The Goddess is known as Anubambikai.

== Senganma ==
In Malaipaṭukaṭām this place is referred as Sengama. Later it became known as Sengam and Kannai.
