= Tirumeni Azhagar Temple, Manikkiramam =

Shiva temple in Tamil Nadu, India

Tirumeni Azhagar Temple is a Siva temple in Manikkiramam in Mayiladuthurai district in Tamil Nadu (India).

== Vaippu Sthalam ==
It is one of the shrines of the Vaippu Sthalams sung by Tamil Saivite Nayanar Appar.

== Presiding deity ==
The presiding deity is Tirumeni Azhagar. The Goddess is known as Soundaranayaki.

== Other shrines ==
This place is also known as Madhangasiramam. Shrines of Vinayaka, Subramania with his consorts Valli and Deivanai, Gajalakshmi, Bairava and Durga are found in this temple.
