= Macchapurisvarar Temple, Koyildevarayanpettai =

Shiva temple in Tamil Nadu, India

Coordinates: 10.9123°N 79.2360°E

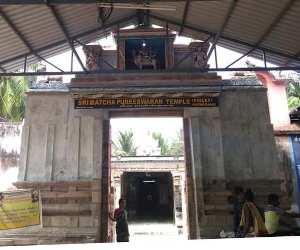
Inner entrance

Macchapurisvarar Temple is a Hindu temple dedicated to the deity Shiva, located at Koyildevarayanpettai in Thanjavur district, Tamil Nadu, India.

== Vaippu Sthalam ==
According to Periya Puranam, this is one of the shrines of the Vaippu Sthalams sung by Tamil Saivite Nayanar Sambandar.

== Presiding deity ==
The presiding deity in the garbhagriha, represented by the lingam, is known as Macchapurisvarar. The Goddess is known as Sugantha Kunthalambigai.

== Specialities ==
In the Prakaram shrine of Subramania with his consorts Valli and Deivanai. Subramania is found with Shankha and chakra.

== Structure ==
This temple was built by Aditya Chola I.In the right side of the temple, shrine of the goddess is found. In the front mandapa, in left, shrines of Dharma Vinayaka, Navagraha and Sanisvara shrines are found.

== Location ==
The temple is located at a distance of 3 km (1.9 mi) from Papanasam, next to Pandaravadai in Papanasam-Thanjavur.

== Photogallery ==
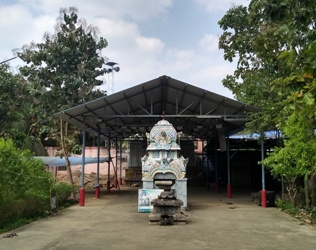
Bali peetam and Nandi mandapa

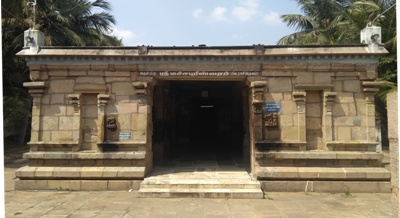
Front mandapa

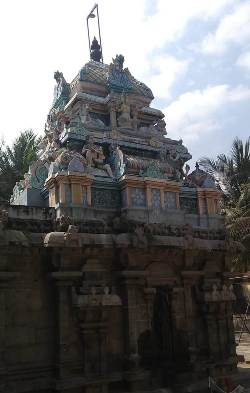
Vimana of the presiding deity
