= Visvanathar Temple, Vidaivaikkudi =

Shiva temple in Tamil Nadu, India

Visvanathar Temple is a Siva temple in Vidaivaikkudi in Nagapattinam district in Tamil Nadu (India).

== Vaippu Sthalam ==
It is one of the shrines of the Vaippu Sthalams sung by Tamil Saivite Nayanar Appar.

== Presiding deity ==
The presiding deity is known as Visvanathar. The Goddess is known as Visalakshi.

== Vakkudi ==
Now this place is known as Vakkudi and Vazhkudi.
