= Ramalingesvarar Temple, Kanjanur =

Shiva temple in Tamil Nadu, India

Ramalingesvarar Temple is a Siva temple in Kanjanur in Villupuram district in Tamil Nadu (India).

== Vaippu Sthalam ==
It is one of the shrines of the Vaippu Sthalams sung by Tamil Saivite Nayanar Sundarar.

== Presiding deity ==
The presiding deity is Ramalingesvarar. The Goddess is known as Soundaranayaki. Separate saniswar with foot on crow head is a deity.

== Vada Kanjanur ==
As there is another place in the name of Kanjanur, this place is known as Vada Kanjanur (North Kanjanur). Now, this place is known as Kanjanur.
