= Kailasanathar Temple, Sivappalli =

Hindu temple in Mayiladuthurai district

Kailasanathar Temple is a Hindu temple dedicated to the deity Shiva, located at Sembonarkovil in Mayiladuthurai district in Tamil Nadu, India.

== Vaippu Sthalam ==
It is one of the shrines of the Vaippu Sthalams sung by Tamil Saivite Nayanar Appar. Now this place is called Tiruchempalli. Tiruchempalli was part of Sembonarkovil. It became Tirusivanpalli and then Tirusivampalli. Now it is called as Tiruchempalli.

== Presiding deity ==
The presiding deity in the garbhagriha is represented by the lingam known as Kailasanathar. The Goddess is known as Parvati. Shrine of Chandikesvarar is also found here.

== Specialities ==
While Dakshan was conducting yajna, Parvathi and Muruga came here. After Parvati left this place, Muruga halted here. Very near to this place, Karuppariyalur is found. In Karuppariyalur, Daksha was killed by Lord Shiva. It is said that Virabhadra went through this place. The darshan of this temple is incomplete without going and worshipping the presiding deity and Parvati. Having Mount Meru as bow Lord Shiva destroyed the asura. In the hymns of Appar so many pallis are found such as Chirappalli, Sivappalli, Sembonpalli, Nanipalli, Thavapalli, Parappalli and Kolliaraippalli. Appar says whoever utter the names of these temples would reach the feet of the Lord Shiva.

== Structure ==
As the main temple of Shiva got dilapidated, the sculptures of presiding deity and the Goddess taken from the place and is kept in the Muruga temple nearby. On either side of the entrance to the Murga temple, they are kept. The entrance is found without gopura. Apart from shrines of presiding deity and Goddess who were brought from the Shiva temple, the main shrine of Subramania with his consorts Valli and Deivanai, originally meant for Muruga is found. A sculpture of Virabhadra is found in a separate shrine. On the head of Virabhadra, linga is found and on his feet Dakshan is found. Virabhadra is holding sword in his hand. As the deities of Shiva and Parvati were brought and kept in this Muruga temple, this is known as Muruga Temple.

== Location ==
One time puja is held in this temple regularly. In Mayiladuthurai-Akkur road, after reaching Sembonarkovil, Mukkoottu road could be arrived. From there in left, at a short distance Angalamman Temple is found. Next to that temple, this temple, known as Muruga Temple or Subramaniaswami Temple could be reached.
