= Gangalanathasamy Temple, Aziyur =

Temple in Tamil Nadu, India

Gangalanathasamy Temple, Aziyur, is a Siva temple in Aziyur in Nagapattinam District in Tamil Nadu (India).

== Vaippu Sthalam ==
It is one of the shrines of the Vaippu Sthalams sung by Tamil Saivite Nayanars Appar and Sundarar.

== Presiding deity ==
The presiding deity is known as Gangalanathasamy. His consort is known as Karpagavalli.

== Structure ==
The temple has compound walls on four sides. It has big entrance with wooden gates. The temple has one prakara. After going through the entrance Vinayaka, bali peetam and nandhi are found. After the second entrance a huge front mandapa is found. Near to it facing east, the shrine of the presiding deity is found. In the north of the front mandapa, facing south, the goddess is found. In the outer prakara, in the south west corner Pralayam Kattha Vinayaka, Subramania with his consorts Valli and Deivanai and Gajalakshmi are found. In the east of the prakara, in south east, Bairava and Surya are found. Azi refers to the sea. There are separate shrines for Muruga and Pidari. In order to get rid of from the sin of the Sura Samhaaram, Muruga consecrated five Linga and set up them five Shiva temples. Of them, this is one of the temple. In this temple there are shrines of presiding deity and the goddess. The temple has a tank.

== Location ==
This temple is located at Tiruvarur-Nagapattinam road, via Kilvelur in between Kilvelur and Sikkal.
