= Semmalainathar Temple, Keezhaiyur =

Hindu temple

Semmalainathar Temple is a Siva temple in Keezhaiyur in Nagapattinam district in Tamil Nadu (India).

== Vaippu Sthalam ==
It is one of the shrines of the Vaippu Sthalams sung by Tamil Saivite Nayanar Sundarar.

== Presiding deity ==
The presiding deity is Semmalainathar. The Goddess is known as Vandamarum Poonguzhalal.

== Location ==
In inscriptions this place is known as 'Arumozhi Deva Valanattu Alanattu Keezhaiyur'. It is located next to Karunganni in Nagapattinam-Thiruthuraipoondi road.
