= Vanmeekanathar Temple, Tiruvetriyur =

Vanmeekanathar Temple is a Siva temple in Tiruvetriyur in Sivagangai district in Tamil Nadu (India).

== Vaippu Sthalam ==
It is one of the shrines of the Vaippu Sthalams sung by Tamil Saivite Nayanar Sambandar and Sundarar.

== Presiding deity ==
The presiding deity is known as Vanmeekanathar. His consort is known as Bagampiriyal. Local people call this place as Bagampiriyal Temple.

== Shrines ==
In the Prakaram shrines of Vinayaka, Subramania, Bairava, Sanisvara and Navagraha are found.
