= Parasunathar Temple, Muzhaiyur =

Coordinates: 10.92522°N 79.35392°E

Parasunathar Temple (பரசுநாதர் கோயில்) is a Hindu temple at Muzhaiyur near Kumbakonam in the Thanjavur district of Tamil Nadu, India. The temple is dedicated to Shiva.

== Vaippu Sthalam ==
It is one of the shrines of the Vaippu Sthalams sung by Tamil Saivite Nayanar Appar.

== Presiding deitys ==
The presiding deity is known as Parasunathar. The Hindu goddess is known as Gnanambika. The presiding deity is in the form of shivalinga. There are also idols of Murugan, Vinayaka and Parashurama
