= Kanthanathaswamy Temple, Erakaram =

Shiva temple in Tamil Nadu, India

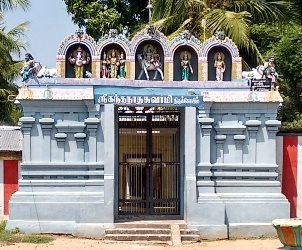
Entrance

Kanthanathaswamy Temple, is a Siva temple in Erakaram, near Swamimalai in Thanjavur District in Tamil Nadu. It is at a distance of 8 km from Kumbakonam.

== Vaippu Sthalam ==
It is one of the shrines of the Vaippu Sthalams sung by Tamil Saivite Nayanar Appar.

== Presiding deity ==
The presiding deity is known as Kanthanathaswamy and Sankaranathar. His consort is known as Sankaranayaki.

== Location ==
It is situated at a distance of 3 km from Yanaiyadi near Melacauvery in Kumbakonam-Swamimalai.
