= Seshapurisvarar Temple, Irappatticcuram =

Temple in Tamil Nadu, India

Religion
- Affiliation: Hinduism
- District: Tiruvarur
- Deity: Lord Shiva

Location
- Location: Kumbakonam-Tiruvarur road
- State: Tamil Nadu
- Country: India

Architecture
- Type: Dravidian architecture

Seshapurisvarar Temple, Irappatticcuram, is a Siva temple in Kumbakonam-Tiruvarur road in Tiruvarur District in Tamil Nadu (India).

== Vaippu Sthalam ==
It is one of the shrines of the Vaippu Sthalams sung by Tamil Saivite Nayanar Appar.

== Presiding deity ==
The presiding deity in the garbhagriha, represented by the lingam, is known as Seshapurisvarar. His consort is known as Andhappuranayagi.

== Shrines ==
Bairava is also worshipped in this temple. Dakshinamurthy, usually found in the kosta is found in the mandapa.

== Structure ==
The temple has no raja gopura. The temple is having an entrance, facing west. After going through the entrance bali peetam and nandhi are found. In the second entrance in either side Mahalakshmi and Saraswati are found. Next to it front mandapa is found. Dakshinamurthy generally found in the kosta in other temples, is found in the front mandapa in this temple. While Nandhi is facing the presiding deity, his head is seen as seeing Dakshinamurthy. A 5.5 feet Bairava is found in the temple. In the presiding deity, snake is also found.

== Location ==
This temple is located near Manakkal in Kumbakonam-Tiruvarur road. One time puja is held in this temple daily.
