= Atakeccuram Nagabilam Temple, Tiruvarur =

Temple in Tamil Nadu, India

Religion
- Affiliation: Hinduism
- District: Tiruvarur
- Deity: Lord Shiva

Location
- Location: Alangudi
- State: Tamil Nadu
- Country: India

Architecture
- Type: Dravidian architecture

Atakeccuram Nagabilam Temple, Tiruvarur, is a Siva temple in Tiruvarur in Tiruvarur District in Tamil Nadu (India).

== Vaippu Sthalam ==
It is one of the shrines of the Vaippu Sthalams sung by Tamil Saivite Nayanar Appar. This temple is found as a separate shrine inside the Thyagaraja Temple, Tiruvarur.

== Presiding deity ==
The shrine is found in the south Prakaram of the temple. It is known as The presiding deity is known as Adakesvarar.
