= Mathangeesvarar Temple, Nangur =

Hindu temple in Tamil Nadu, India

Mathangeesvarar Temple is a Hindu temple dedicated to the deity Shiva, located at Nangur in Nagapattinam district, Tamil Nadu, India.

== Vaippu Sthalam ==
It is one of the shrines of the Vaippu Sthalams sung by Tamil Saivite Nayanar Sundarar. This place is also known as Parasaravanam. As this is the capital of Nangur, it is also known 'Nangur Nattu Nangur'. The temple tree is vanni. Once around the 11 Shiva temples Rishaba Seva was conducted in and around this area.

== Presiding deity ==
The presiding deity in the garbhagriha, represented by the lingam, is known as Mathangeesvarar. The Goddess is known as Mathangeesvari. Temple tree is vanni and the temple tirtta is Madanka teertham.

== Specialities ==
Irumpidarthalaiyar and Sendanar belonged to this place. Twin poets sung the presiding deity. Mathangar, the son of Brahma worshipped the deity and got a boon that Shiva would become his father in law. While doing penance, he found a girl in the pond on a flower. She named her Mathangi and taught her many forms of art. When she attained age, he prayed Shiva and in turn Shiva married as per his wish. Mathangar considered them as Shiva and Parvati. As per his wish, Shiva got the name of Mathangeesvarar. Without inviting Shiva, Dakshan conducted a yajna. Shiva, sent Virabhadra, against the yajna. Getting angry, Shiva danced the Rudra dance. At that time 11 Shiva forms came. In order to contain the angry Vishnu took 11 forms. Based on this there are 11 Shiva temples were built of which nine exists now. This place has 11 Vishnu temples sung by Alvars. This is the only place where nine Shiva temples and 11 Vishnu temples are found.

== Structure ==
The vimana is called Ekanta Vimana. Two nandis are found, one near the presiding deity and another one in opposite direction. During Pradosha, abisega is held simultaneously these two nandis. It is believed that worshipping them would give so many boons to the devotees.

== Location ==
The temple is located at a distance of 2 km. from Annanperumalkoil at Nangur road near Sirkazhi-Nagapattinam road, via Porayar. Town bus facilities are available from Sirkazhi and Mayiladuthurai. This temple is opened for worship from 7.00 a.m. to 8.00 p.m. Wedding festival is conducted during the Tamil month of Vaikasi (May-June).
