= Elumur Ardhanareeswarar Temple =

Temple in Tamil Nadu, India

Religion
- Affiliation: Hinduism
- District: Chennai
- Deity: Lord Shiva

Location
- Location: Chennai
- State: Tamil Nadu
- Country: India
- Geographic coordinates: 13°4′41″N 80°15′11″E

Elumur Ardhanareeswarar Temple is a Siva temple in Egmore in Chennai in Tamil Nadu (India). It is one of the shrines of the Vaippu Sthalams sung by Tamil Saivite Nayanar Appar.

== History ==
The temple is believed to have existed at least since the 7th century CE, when Appar sang about it. Thus, the temple comes under the Vaippu Sthalam group of temples sung by Nayanars. Appar calls the place as "Elhu-mur" or "Elhu-oor" or "Ezhumur", literally meaning the "place of seven", which signifies the seven sages, viz. Atri, Brighu, Bharadwaja, Vasishta, Gautama, Kashyapa, and Vishwamitra, all of whom are believed to have worshiped Lord Shiva here. The name was later anglicized as "Egmore". The temple is believed to have fallen into disrepair. Several centuries later, the idols were rediscovered when an old man arranged for cleaning of the tank on the land that he owned. When the water dried, a massive Shivlinga was found buried in the soil along with other idols. The man recovered them and installed them under a thatched roof, and worship began with lighting lamps. Later a new structure was built for the idols. As the idols were submerged in water for a long time, the deity is praised as "Jalakandeswarar".

== Idols and structures within the temple ==
The temple faces east and has Mahamantapa (great hall), Bali peeta, and Nandi mantapa. The presiding deity is known as Ardhanarisvarar (Shiva). His consort is known as Tiripurasundari (Parvathi). Shiva appears in the form of Lingam, mounted on a base known as avudayar of 3.5-feet circumference. The Ardhanareeswara form belongs to Satyo Jatham, facing west. The Tripurasundari shrine is located to the left of the presiding deity, facing south.

Outside the sanctum sanctorum, individual shrines of Ganesha, Subramanya, Lakshmi Narayana, Garuda, Anchaneya, and the Navagrahas are present. Idols of Dakshinamurthi, Durga, and Chandikeshwara found on the goshta wall of the temple. The Lakshmi Narayana Perumal shrine is located to the right of the presiding deity, with the Garuda shrine located opposite, facing Lakshmi Narayana Perumal.

There are also procession deities for all the gods found in the temple, which will be taken on procession during festive days.

== See also ==
- Heritage buildings in Chennai
