= Vanmeekanathar Temple, Tiruneipperu =

Shiva temple in Tamil Nadu, India

Religion
- Affiliation: Hinduism
- District: Tiruvarur
- Deity: Lord Shiva

Location
- Location: Tiruvarur-Thiruthuraipoondi Road
- State: Tamil Nadu
- Country: India

Vanmeekanathar Temple, Tiruneipperu is a Siva temple in Tiruvarur district in Tamil Nadu (India). This place is also known as Adiyar Temple. It is at distance of 8 km in Tiruvarur-Thiruthuraipoondi Road The temple can be reached just opposite to Nami Nandi Adigal temple.

== Vaippu Sthalam ==
It is one of the shrines of the Vaippu Sthalams sung by Tamil Saivite Nayanar Appar. This place is also known as Emapperur.

== Presiding deity ==
The presiding deity in the garbhagriha, represented by the lingam, is known as Vanmeekanathar. His consort is known as Umaparameswari. This was the birthplace of Nami Nandi Adigal.

== Shrines ==
In the Prakaram shrines of Vinayaka, Subramania, Bairava, Sanisvara and Surya are found. In the front mandapa the shrine of the goddess is found.

== Kumbhabhishekham ==
The Kumbhabhishekham of the temple was held on 30 March 2018.
