= Visvanathar Temple, Iravancheri =

Shiva temple in Tamil Nadu, India

Visvanathar Temple is a Siva temple in Iravancheri in Nagapattinam district in Tamil Nadu (India).

== Vaippu Sthalam ==
It is one of the shrines of the Vaippu Sthalams sung by Tamil Saivite Nayanar Appar.

== Presiding deity ==
The presiding deity is known as Visvanathar. The Goddess is known as Visalakshi.

== Location ==
This place is located in Tiruvarur-Kilvelur road, next to Neepaladi.
