= Aditesvarar Temple, Peravur =

Temple in Tamil Nadu, India

Aditesvarar Temple is a Siva temple in Peravur located near Thiruvavaduthurai village in Mayiladuthurai district in Tamil Nadu (India).

== Vaippu Sthalam ==
It is one of the shrines of the Vaippu Sthalams sung by Tamil Saivite Nayanar Appar.

== Presiding deity ==
The presiding deity is Aditesvarar. The Goddess is known as Gnanambikai.

== Speciality ==
This was built by Aditya Chola and is known as Aditesvaram. Shrines of Vinayaka, Subramania, Gajalakshmi, and Chandikesvarar are found.
