= Siva Temple, Gunavayil =

Hindu temple

Siva Temple is a Siva temple in Gunavayil in Kerala, (India).

== Vaippu Sthalam ==
It is one of the shrines of the Vaippu Sthalams sung by Tamil Saivite Nayanars Sambandar and Appar.

== Silappatikaram ==
In Silappatikaram this place is referred as 'Gunavayil Kottam'.

== Location ==
This place is located in the west of Kodungallur in Kerala.
