= Kailasanathar Temple, Ezhur =

Temple in Tamil Nadu, India

Kailasanathar Temple is a Siva temple in Ezhur in Namakkal district in Tamil Nadu (India).

== Vaippu Sthalam ==
It is one of the shrines of the Vaippu Sthalams sung by Tamil Saivite Nayanar Appar.

== Presiding deity ==
The presiding deity is known as Kailasanathar.

== Speciality ==
In a pillar Sivalinga, Dakshinamurti, Nandi and Durga sculptures are found.
