= Satyavasahar Temple, Matthur =

Shiva temple in Tamil Nadu, India

Satyavashar Temple is a Siva temple in Matthur in Mayiladuthurai district in Tamil Nadu (India).

== Vaippu Sthalam ==
It is one of the shrines of the Vaippu Sthalams sung by Tamil Saivite Nayanar Sambandar and Sundarar.

== Presiding deity ==
The presiding deity is known as Satyavashar Temple. The Goddess is known as Soundaranayaki.

== Mattur ==
Earlier this place was known as Mattur. Now it is called as Matthur.
