= Mummudinathar Temple, Iraiyanceri =

Temple in Tamil Nadu, India

Mummudinathar Temple, Iraiyanceri is a Siva temple at a distance of 1 km from Devakottai in Sivaganga District in Tamil Nadu (India).

== Vaippu Sthalam ==
It is one of the shrines of the Vaippu Sthalams sung by Tamil Saivite Nayanar Appar. It is wrongly attributed so. According to the Song shown in the temple it belongs to the 6th Thiru Murai sung by Appar a.k.a. Thirunavukkarasar. He referred to the 4th Poem of 70th chapter a.k.a. 70.4 poem. Saivam.org and other authentic persons claim that the village "Iraiyanceri" mentioned by Appar is near Thiruvarur, in Tamilnadu. it has nothing to do with Iravuseri a.k.a. Iraguseri. This temple is not glorified by any poet till date.

== Presiding deity ==
The presiding deity is known as Mummudinathar. His consort is known as Soundaranayagai.

== Shrines ==
Rajagopura, shrines for Nataraja, goddess and Surya are found. In the kosta, Nartana Vinayaka, Dakshinamurthy, Lingodbhava, Brahma and Durga are found.
