= Kandhamaadhanamalai, Thiruchendur =

Kandhamaadhanamalai is a Siva temple in Thiruchendur in Thoothukudi district of Tamil Nadu (India).

== Vaippu Sthalam ==
It is one of the shrines of the Vaippu Sthalams sung by Tamil Saivite Nayanar Appar.

== Presiding deity ==
The presiding deity is known as Senthil Andavar.

== Location ==
It is situated near the Perumal Temple at Thiruchendur Murugan Temple, in a hill-like structure.
