= Thiripurantakar Temple, Palayamkottai =

Shiva temple in Tamil Nadu, India

Thiripurantakar Temple is a Hindu temple dedicated to the deity Shiva, located at Palayamkottai in Tirunelvely district, Tamil Nadu, India.

== Vaippu Sthalam ==
It is one of the shrines of the Vaippu Sthalams sung by Tamil Saivite Nayanar Appar.

== Presiding deity ==
The presiding deity in the garbhagriha, represented by the lingam, is known as Thiripurantakar. The Goddess is known as Visalakshi.

== Specialities ==
Thamirabarani River is the temple tirtta. The shrines of the presiding deity and the goddess have separate vimanas. In the shrine of the presiding deity, Subramania is also found. In the entrance Veeravahudevar and Veeramahendrar are found on either side. While going around the shrine of the goddess, Vallabai Vinayaka is found.

63 Nayanars festival is celebrated in a grand manner in this temple. On that particular day, the Lord, along with these nayanmars bestow blessings. Rare paintings of 63 nayanmars are found in this temple.

== Structure ==
In the prakara shrines of Jwarakesvarar, Saptamatas, Nayanars, Vinayaka, Subramania with his consorts Valli and Deivanai, Gajalakshmi, Saraswati, Sanisvara, Nataraja, Navagraha, and Bairava are found. In the kosta, Dakshinamurthy, Lingodbhava and Durga are found.

== Location ==
The temple is located at Palayamkottai, which is connected with Tirunelvely. More buses are available from Tirunelely and other major cities of Tamil Nadu.
