= Valisvarar Temple, Sevur =

Shiva temple in Tamil Nadu, India

- Valeeswarar Temple, Sevur, Tiruppur, Tamil Nadu

Religion
- Affiliation: Hinduism
- District: Tiruppur
- Deity: Valeeswarar
- Festival: Maha Shivaratri

Location
- Location: Sevur
- State: Tamil Nadu
- Country: India
- Interactive map of Valisvarar Temple, Sevur
- Coordinates: 11°14′56.4″N 77°14′20.6″E

Architecture
- Type: Dravidian architecture

Specifications
- Temple: One
- Elevation: 366.58 m (1,203 ft)

Valisvarar Temple is a Siva temple in Sevur in Tiruppur in Tamil Nadu, India.

== Vaippu Sthalam ==
It is one of the shrines of the Vaippu Sthalams sung by Tamil Saivite Nayanar Sambandar and Sundarar.

== Presiding deity ==
The presiding deity is known as Valisvarar. The Goddess is known as Aram Valartha Nayaki.

== Speciality ==
This place was worshipped by Vali.
