= Avalpoondurai =

Avalpoondurai Poondurai
- Panchayat town
- Avalpoondurai, Tamil Nadu
- Coordinates: 11°13′55.9″N 77°43′05.9″E
- Country: India
- State: Tamil Nadu
- District: Erode

Area
  - Total: 26.26 km^{2} (10.14 sq mi)

Population (2011)
  - Total: 11,789
  - Density: 448.9/km^{2} (1,163/sq mi)

Languages
  - Official: Tamil
- Time zone: UTC+5:30 (IST)
- Postal code: 638115

Avalpoondurai is a panchayat town in Modakurichi taluk of Erode district in the Indian state of Tamil Nadu. It is located in the north-western part of the state. Spread across an area of 26.26 km^{2} (10.14 sq mi), it had a population of 11,789 individuals as per the 2011 census.

== Geography and administration ==
Avalpoondurai is located in Modakurichi taluk, Erode division of Erode district in the Indian state of Tamil Nadu. Spread across an area of 7.44 km^{2} (2.87 sq mi), it is one of the 42 panchayat towns in the district. It is located in the north-western part of the state towards the southern end of the Indian peninsula.

The town panchayat is headed by a chairperson, who is elected by the members, who are chosen through direct elections. The town forms part of the Modakkurichi Assembly constituency that elects its member to the Tamil Nadu legislative assembly and the Erode Lok Sabha constituency that elects its member to the Parliament of India.

== Demographics ==
As per the 2011 census, Avalpoondurai had a population of 11,789 individuals. The population saw a marginal increase compared to the previous census in 2001 when 11,243 inhabitants were registered. The population consisted of 5,813 males and 5,976 females. The entire population is classified as urban. The town has an average literacy rate of 73.5%. About 17% of the population belonged to scheduled castes.

About 52.3% of the eligible population was employed. Hinduism was the majority religion which was followed by 95.6% of the population, with Christianity (3.9%) and Islam (0.4%) being minor religions. The Pushpavanesvarar Temple dedicated to Shiva is a major Hindu shaivite temple located in the region.
