= Vishamangalesvarar Temple, Thudaiyur =

Shiva temple in Tamil Nadu, India

Saptharishishwarar Temple is a Hindu temple dedicated to the deity Shiva, located at Thudaiyur in Tiruchirapalli district, Tamil Nadu, India.

== Vaippu Sthalam ==
It is one of the shrines of the Vaippu Sthalams sung by Tamil Saivite Nayanar Appar. This place is now known as Thodaiyur.

== Presiding deity ==
The presiding deity in the garbhagriha, represented by the lingam, is known as Vishamangalesvarar. The Goddess is known as Mangalanayaki.

== Specialities ==
The presiding deity is also known as Kadambavanesvarar and the Goddess as Veeramangalesvari. It is said that while Devas and asuras were churning the milky ocean, Shiva kept the poison which came from it and saved the world. So the presiding deity is known as Vishamangalesvarar. One of the Panchapandavas, Sahadeva worshipped the deity. Banumathy, wife of Duryodhana also worshipped here. It is believed that till date Asala Nisumithra Mahirisi is worshipping the deity.

== Structure ==
The presiding deity is facing east, while the goddess is facing south. In the inner prakara shrines of Vinayaka, Subramania and Saraswati are found. On either side of the garbhagriha, Dvarapalas are found. The shrine of the goddess is found in the mahamandapa. While entering into the temple Vishnu could be seen with his consorts, in sitting portion, with four hands, having a prayoka chakra in his left hand. Generally Chandra and Surya are found facing the presiding deity, on either side in all Shiva temple. But in this temple, in that place Vishnu is found with his consorts, which is a rare one. Surya is called as Surya Narayana in this temple. While going around the temple, in the south kosta, Dakshinamurthy is found. He is also known as Thikasandala Veena Dakshinamurti. In Lalgudi Saptharishishwarar Temple this type of Dakshinamurti is found. In the kosta of the rear side garbhagriha, Shiva in the form of Alinganamurti is found. His right hand is in chin mudra, while left hand is hugging Parvati.

== Location ==
The temple is located at Thudaiyur in Tiruchirappalli-Lalgudi-Namakkal-Salem road, at a distance of 10 km from Tirchirappalli. In Tiruchirappalli-Musiri road just before Tiruvasi, this place is found. This temple can be reached from Thudaiyur the bus stop, after crossing the bridge in left side. It is opened for worship from 8.00 to 12.30 a.m. and 5.00 to 7.00 p.m.
