= Panjapurisvarar Temple, Panjakkai =

Shiva temple in Tamil Nadu, India

Panjapurisvarar Temple, Panchakkai is a Siva temple in Mayiladuthurai district in Tamil Nadu (India).

== Vaippu Sthalam ==
It is one of the shrines of the Vaippu Sthalams sung by Tamil Saivite Nayanar Appar.

== Presiding deity ==
The presiding deity is Panjapurisvarar.

== Other Shrines ==
The presiding deity is kept in a shed. Sculptures of Gnanasambandar, Appar and Sundarar are found.
