= Thirumoolattanesvarar Temple, Thellaru =

Shiva temple in Tamil Nadu, India

Thirumoolattanesvarar Temple is a Hindu temple dedicated to the deity Shiva, located at Thellaru in Tiruvannamalai district, Tamil Nadu, India.

== Vaippu Sthalam ==
It is one of the shrines of the Vaippu Sthalams sung by Tamil Saivite Nayanars Appar and Sundarar.

== Presiding deity ==
The presiding deity in the garbhagriha, represented by the lingam, is known as Thirumoolattanesvarar.The Goddess is known as Akilandesvari.

== Specialities ==
From an inscription found in the temple it is learnt that once when women were returning after taking drinking water from the tank, a drunkard ridiculed him. The women in turn reported the matter to the Panchayat Court. The case was discussed and in order to get rid off from the sin committed, he had to light lamp in the Thirumoolattanesvarar Temple for some. The Judge who delivered the judgement was nothing other than the wife of the drunkard. On one particular day instead of the drunkard his wife went to the temple to carry out the work of lighting of lamp. One woman enquired her after giving judgement, why she herself was going to the temple. At that time she said that as a judge she gave the judgement and as her wife she was doing the duty of a wife. In the history of Tamil Nadu Thellaru finds a place because of the two wars, known as Thellaru wars. Due to these wars many changes took place in the history.

== Structure ==
The temple is facing east, without any gopura. In has only one entrance. In the facade stucco sculptures of Vinayaka, Subramania, goddess and Chandikesvarar. The shrine of the goddess is facing south. In the inner prakara, Bairava is found. There is a separate shrine for Sanisvara. In the kosta, Vinayaka, Dakshinamurthy, Vishnu, Brahma and Durga are found.

== Location ==
The temple is located at Thellaru, at distance of 8 km in Vandavasi-Tindivanam road. It is very near to the bus stand of Thellaru. It is opened for worship from 6.00 a.m. to 12.00 noon.
