= Mandaravanesvarar Temple, Attur =

Shiva temple in Tamil Nadu, India

Mandaravanesvarar Temple is a Siva temple in Attur, in Mayiladuthurai district in Tamil Nadu (India).

The temple is located near the village of Manalmedu, on State Highway 150, along the Vaitheswaran Koil–Thirupananthal road.

== Vaippu Sthalam ==
It is one of the shrines of the Vaippu Sthalams sung by Tamil Saivite Nayanar Appar.

== Presiding deity ==
The presiding deity is known as Mandaravanesvarar and Sornapurisvarar. The Goddess is known as Anjanatchi and Angayarkanni.

== Speciality ==
This place is also known as Mandaravanam. Inscriptions of Cholas are found in this temple.
