= Kodeesvarar Temple, Kothangudi =

Hindu temple in Nagapattinam district

Kodeesvarar Temple also known as Kothangudi Arumpakkam Sivan Kovil, is a Hindu temple dedicated to the deity Shiva, located at village Kothangudi in Sembnarkoil block, Mayiladuthurai district in Tamil Nadu, India.

It is one of the shrines of the Vaippu Sthalams sung by Tamil Saivite Nayanar Sambandar. The presiding deity is represented by the lingam known as Kodeesvarar. The consort is known as Prannayaki.
