= Visvanathar Temple, Kunniyur =

Shiva temple in Tiruvarur district, India

Religion
- Affiliation: Hinduism
- District: Tiruvarur
- Deity: Lord Shiva

Location
- Location: Kunniyur
- State: Tamil Nadu
- Country: India

Architecture
- Type: Dravidian architecture

Visvanathar Temple Temple is a Hindu temple dedicated to the deity Shiva, located at Kunniyur in Tiruvarur district in Tamil Nadu (India).

== Vaippu Sthalam ==
It is one of the shrines of the Vaippu Sthalams sung by Tamil Saivite Nayanar Sambandar and Appar.

== Presiding deity ==
The presiding deity is represented by the lingam known as Visvanathar. The Goddess is known as Visalakshi.

== Location ==
In inscriptions this place is known as Arumozhideva Valanattu Kundriyur. It is located at a distance of 10 km in Tiruvarur in Thiruthuraipoondi road.
