= Thinthirineesvarar Temple, Tindivanam =

Shiva temple in Viluppuram district, Tamil Nadu, India

Thinthirineeswarar Temple
- Thinthirineeswarar Temple, Tindivanam, Tamil Nadu

Religion
- Affiliation: Hinduism
- District: Viluppuram
- Deity: Thinthirineeswarar
- Festival: Maha Shivaratri

Location
- Location: Tindivanam
- State: Tamil Nadu
- Country: India
- Interactive map of Thinthirineeswarar Temple
- Coordinates: 12.235469°N 79.652193°E

Architecture
- Type: Dravidian architecture
- Completed

Specifications
- Temple: One
- Elevation: 80.42 m (264 ft)

Thinthirineesvarar Temple is a Hindu temple dedicated to the deity Shiva, located at Tindivanam in Villupuram district, Tamil Nadu, India.

== Vaippu Sthalam ==
It is one of the shrines of the Vaippu Sthalams sung by Tamil Saivite Nayanar Appar. This place is also known as Thindeechuram, Thinthiruni and Pulithinthirunvanam. This temple is also known Easwaran Temple.

== Presiding deity ==
The presiding deity in the garbhagriha, represented by the lingam, is known as Thinthirineesvarar. The Goddess is known as Maragathavalli and Marathambal.

== Specialities ==
The presiding deity was worshipped by Valmiki, Vyasar, Tindi, Mundi, Killi and Killali. It is said that the vimana of the temple was built by Vyasar. In inscription found in this temple, this place is known as "Oymanattu...Thiruthindeechuram".

== Structure ==
The temple, with gopura, is facing east. After crossing the entrance Dwajasthambam, bali peetam and nandhi mandap are found. Next to them the shrine of the presiding deity is found. The shrine of the Goddess is found in the outer prakaram. In the Prakaram, shrines of Navagraha, Tirumular and Bairava. The sculpture of Bairava is very beautiful to look. The lower structure is of granite while the higher part is made of bricks. In the kosta, Vinayaka, Dakshinamurthy, Brahma, Vishnu and Durga are found.

== Festival ==
Adhikara Nandhi festival is held in this temple.

== Location ==
The temple is located at Tindivanam in Madras-Trichy road. After crossing the flyover, the temple can be reached in the Easwaran Koil Street. It is opened for worship from 6.00 to 11.30 a.m. and 4.00 to 9.00 p.m.
