= Siva Temple, Punganur =

Hindu temple in Chitoor

Siva Temple is a Siva temple in Punganur in Annamayya district in Andhra Pradesh (India).

== Vaippu Sthalam ==
It is one of the shrines of the Vaippu Sthalams sung by Tamil Saivite Nayanar Appar.

== Presiding deity ==
The presiding deity is Shiva. He is known as Kukkudesvarar.

== Location ==
This place is also known as Kukkudechuram. From Chittoor, after reaching Palamaner this temple can be reached in Madhanapalli road.
