= Pasupatheesvarar Temple, Thinnakkonam =

Temple in Tamil Nadu, India

Pasupatheesvarar Temple is a Hindu temple dedicated to the deity Shiva, located at Lalgudi in Tiruchirapalli district, Tamil Nadu, India.

== Vaippu Sthalam ==
It is one of the shrines of the Vaippu Sthalams sung by Tamil Saivite Nayanar Sambandar. This place is also known as Narkundram.

== Presiding deity ==
The presiding deity in the garbhagriha, represented by the lingam, is known as Pasupatheesvarar and Sadanandar. The Goddess is known as Govindavalli and Sivakamasundari.

== Specialities ==
The name of the temple and the deities changed in due course. In the inscriptions of Parantaka I, this place is recorded as Thiruvirarkundram and Thirunarkundram and the presiding deity as Thirumadatthu Koonanar and Sadanandar. The name of this place is referred as Thinnakkonam and Thinnakunam, in inscriptions. The sanctum sanctorum is found in the shape of Gajabrishta.

== Other shrines ==
Apart from the shrines of presiding deity and Goddess, the shrines of Vinayaka, Subramania with his consorts Valli and Deivanai, Bairava and Navagraha shrines are found in this temple. This temple is having gopura. Lingodbhava is found. Kamadhenu, as a cow, worshipped the presiding deity of the temple and got attainment. Vinayaka is in 4 feet height.

== Location ==
The temple is located at Thinnakknam. Next to Musiri-Velakkanattham road, in Evur the road takes diversion. From there after crossing Nacchampatti one can reach Thinnakkonam. It is opened for worship from 8.00 to 10.00 a.m. and 6.00 to 7.30 p.m. Pujas are held twice daily. Sivaratri in Tamil month of Masi and Navarati in Tamil month of Purattasi are held in grand manner.
