= Thagamthirtthapurisvarar Temple, Eraiyur =

Temple in Tamil Nadu, India

Thagamthirtthapurisvarar Temple is a Siva temple in Eraiyur in Cuddalore district in Tamil Nadu (India).

== Vaippu Sthalam ==
It is one of the shrines of the Vaippu Sthalams sung by Tamil Saivite Nayanar Sambandar.

== Presiding deity ==
The presiding deity is known as Thagamthirtthapurisvarar. The Goddess is known as Annapurani.

== Speciality ==
This place was called as Maranpadi. Now it is known as Eraiyur or Iraiyur. The presiding deity and Sambandar are found in separate shrines.
