= Tirukamesvarar Temple, Ponnur =

Temple in Tamil Nadu, India

Tirukamesvarar Temple is a Siva temple in Ponnur in Tiruvannamalai district in Tamil Nadu (India).

== Vaippu Sthalam ==
It is one of the shrines of the Vaippu Sthalams sung by Tamil Saivite Nayanar Sundarar.

== Presiding deity ==
The presiding deity is Tirukamesvarar and also Parasaresvarar. The Goddess is known as Santanayaki.

== Speciality ==
This temple was built by Pallavas. Inscriptions of Kulottunga Chola, Vijayanagara kings and Pandya king Sundara Pandya are found in this temple.
