= Ekambaranathar Temple, Tiruvekambathur =

Temple in Tamil Nadu, India

Ekambaranathar Temple, Tiruvekambathur, is a Siva temple in Tiruvekambathur in Ramnad District in Tamil Nadu (India). It is also known as Tiruvekambattu and Tiruvekambam.

== Vaippu Sthalam ==
It is one of the shrines of the Vaippu Sthalams sung by Tamil Saivite Nayanar Appar.

== Presiding deity ==
The presiding deity is known as Ekambaranathar . His consort is known as Snehavalli.

== Shrines ==
Shrines Vinayaka, Subramania, Navagraha, Bairava and Chandra are found. In the kosta, Dakshinamurthy, Lingodbhava and Brahma are found.
