= Sundaresvarar Temple, Kundayur =

Hindu temple in Nagapattinam district

Sundareswarar Temple
- Sundareswarar Temple, Kundaiyur, Thirukkuvalai, Nagapattinam, Tamil Nadu

Religion
- Affiliation: Hinduism
- District: Nagapattinam
- Deity: Sundareswarar
- Festival: Maha Shivaratri

Location
- Location: Kundaiyur, Thirukkuvalai
- State: Tamil Nadu
- Country: India
- Interactive map of Sundareswarar Temple
- Coordinates: 10.6379°N 79.7219°E

Architecture
- Type: Dravidian architecture
- Completed

Specifications
- Temple: One
- Elevation: 34.4 m (113 ft)

Sundaresvarar Temple is a Hindu temple dedicated to the deity Shiva, located at Kundaiyur in Nagapattinam district in Tamil Nadu (India).

== Vaippu Sthalam ==
It is one of the shrines of the Vaippu Sthalams sung by Tamil Saivite Nayanar Sundarar.

== Presiding deity ==
The presiding deity is represented by the lingam known as Sundaresvarar. The Goddess is known as Meenakshi.

== Specialities ==
Kundayur Kizhar, a devotee of Shival lived here and offered his services to the deity of this temple. Once Sundarar came to Tirukkuvalai and asked the Lord to send the paddy which he received. The deity accepted his request and sent them to Thiruvarur through his ganas. Sundaresvarar is also known as Sokkanathasamy and so this place is called Sokkanathasamy Devasthanam. His shrine is found outside. Inside the shrines of Rishaburisvarar and Mangalambikai shrines are also found. Two Atti trees are found in this temple. During Masi Maham that occurs in the Tamil month of Masi (February–March) in the star of Magam, the paddy receiving festival, known as Nel Atti Vizha is held in this temple.

== Structure ==
Though the temple does not have Gopuram, it has entrances in east and west. After entering through east gate, bali peeta and nandhi mandapa are found. Next to them the second entrance leading to the presiding deity is found. In the garbhagriha Rishaburisvarar is found. On either side of the garbhagriha dwarapalakas, the gatekeepers, are found. In front of the main shrine nandhi is found. The deity is found at a higher level, which can be reached through the four steps. In the front mandapa in north, the shrine of the Goddess is found. It is facing south. In the outer Prakaram shrines of Vinayaka, Subramania with his consorts Valli and Deivanai, Gajalakshmi, Bairava and Surya are found. A separate shrine for Kundayur Kizhar is also found in this prakara.

== Location ==
It is located at a distance of 1 km from Thirukkuvalai in Thirukkuvalai-Sattiyakkudi road.
