= Dharmapureesvarar Temple, Vadakandam =

Shiva temple in Tiruvarur district, Tamil Nadu, India

- Dharmapureeswarar Temple, Vadakandam, Tiruvarur district, Tamil Nadu

Religion
- Affiliation: Hinduism
- District: Tiruvarur
- Deity: Lord (Shiva),

Location
- Location: Vadakandam,Tiruvarur district
- State: Tamil Nadu
- Country: India
- Coordinates: 10.8043°N 79.5862°E

Architecture
- Type: Dravidian architecture
- Elevation: 35.63 m (117 ft)

Dharmapureesvarar Temple is a Hindu temple dedicated to the deity Shiva, located at Vadakandam in Tiruvarur district, Tamil Nadu, India.

The presiding deity is known as Dharmapureesvarar.

== Structure ==
This temple has no rajagopura. It has a compound wall. The entrance is facing east. In the facade of the entrance of the temple. stucco figures of Shiva and Parvati are found. Next to the entrance the temple is found with one prakara. Very near to it bali peetam and nandhi mandapa are found. The temple has an entrance in the south also. While going around the prakara shrines of Vinayaka and Subramania with his consorts Valli and Deivanai are found in the west. After crossing bali peetam and nandhi mandapa, through the inner entrance, garbhagriha could be reached to see the presiding deity. The shrine is facing east. The shrine of Swarnambal is facing south. In the kosta Dakshinamurthy, Lingodbhava, Brahma and Durga are found.
