= Mahakalesvarar Temple, Anai Mahalam =

Shiva temple in Tamil Nadu, India

Mahakalesvarar Temple is a Siva temple in Anai Mahalam in Nagapattinam district in Tamil Nadu (India).

== Vaippu Sthalam ==
It is one of the shrines of the Vaippu Sthalams sung by Tamil Saivite Nayanar Appar.

== Presiding deity ==
The presiding deity is known as Mahakalesvarar. The Goddess is known as Mangalanayaki.

== Speciality ==
It is said that when Subramania came to worship Lord Shiva at Kilvelur, this place was worshipped by Kali.
