= Brahmapurisvarar Temple, Perambur =

Siva temple in Tamil Nadu, India

Brahmapurisvarar Temple, Perambur is a Siva temple in Perambur in Mayiladuthurai district in Tamil Nadu (India).

== Vaippu Sthalam ==
It is one of the shrines of the Vaippu Sthalams sung by Tamil Saivite Nayanar Appar. This place was known as Pirambil.

== Presiding deity ==
The presiding deity in the garbhagriha, represented by the lingam, is Brahmapurisvarar. The Goddess is known as Anandavalli. Earlier this temple was found in the back side and after dilapidation, the sculptures of presiding deity and the goddess was kept in the Subramania temple. As the presiding deity and the goddess are kept in the prakara of the temple, the presiding deity is Subramania. Sculptures of Vinayaka and Lakshmi Narayana Perumal are also found along with these sculptures. Agastya is also found in this temple.

== Location ==
This temple is located in Perambur in Mayiladuthurai-Porayar road (Via Manganallur), at a distance of 8 km from Manganallur.
