= Meenakshi Sundaresvarar Temple, Sindhu Poondurai =

Shiva temple in Tamil Nadu, India

Meenakshi Sundaresvarar Temple, Sindhu Poondurai is a Siva temple in Tirunelveli town of the Tirunelveli district in Tamil Nadu (India).

== Vaippu Sthalam ==
It is one of the shrines of the Vaippu Sthalams sung by Tamil Saivite Nayanar Appar. The area around the Bus stand of Tirunelvely town is known as Poondurai and also known as Sindhu Poondurai. The temple is found here.

== Presiding deity ==
The presiding deity is Meenakshi Sundaresvarar. The Goddess is known as Meenakshi.

== Other shriness ==
In the outer Prakaram Vinayaka, Subramania with his consorts Valli and Deivanai, Sanisvara and Navagraha, are found. The shrine of Nataraja is also found here.
