= Sundaresvarar Temple, Kattur =

Hindu temple in Tiruvarur district

Religion
- Affiliation: Hinduism
- District: Tiruvarur
- Deity: Lord Shiva

Location
- Location: Kattur
- State: Tamil Nadu
- Country: India

Architecture
- Type: Dravidian architecture

Sundaresvarar Temple, Kattur is a Hindu temple dedicated to the deity Shiva, located at Kattur in Tiruvarur district, Tamil Nadu, India.

== Vaippu Sthalam ==
It is one of the Vaippu Sthalams mentioned in songs by Tamil Saivite Nayanar Sambandar, one of the 63 Hindu saints living in Tamil Nadu during the 6th to 8th centuries CE.

== Presiding deity ==
The presiding deity represented by the lingam is known as Sundaresvarar. His consort is known as Abirami Ammai.

== Other deities ==
In the Prakaram, shrines of Subramania, Surya and Vinayaka are found.

== Location ==
This temple is located at Kattur in Tiruvarur-Kumbakonam road, at a distance of 5 km from Tiruvarur.
