= Brahmapuri, Jodhpur =

Brahmapuri is a settlement in the city of Jodhpur in Rajasthan, India. The neighbourhood is at the foot of fort Mehrangarh. It is a settlement of Brahmins. Most of the walls are coloured in blue and so it is called a blue city. The main road of the area settles down at the twin-lakes of Roop Sagar and Padam Sagar at the foot of the fort.
