= Pushpavanesvarar Temple, Avalpoondurai =

Hindu temple in Tamil Nadu, India

Pushpavanesvarar Temple, Avalpoondurai is a Shiva temple in Poondurai also known as Avalpoondurai in Erode District in Tamil Nadu (India). It is situated in Erode-Dharapuram road which goes through Arachalur.

== Vaippu Sthalam ==
It is one of the shrines of the Vaippu Sthalams sung by Tamil Saivite Nayanar Appar.

== Presiding deity ==
The presiding deity is known as Pushpavanesvarar. His consort is known as Bagampiriyal. The shrine of the Goddess is found as a separate temple. In the prakara separate shrines are found for Navagraha, Bairava, Surya and others. Vinayaka is found under Vanni Tree. In the kosta Dakshinamurthy, Lingotpava and Brahma are found.

== Specialities ==
This place is sung as "Menmaiperu Poondurai" (The Great Poondurai), "Pon mevum Poondurai" (The Gold found Poondurai), and "Ponnulakor pugalnthidum Poondurai" (Poondurai beloved by one and all). Kaliyanna Pulavar sung Poondurai Puranam about this temple.

== Kumbabishegam ==
The Kumbhabhishekham was slated on 23 August 2010. Earlier Kumbabishegam was held during 1990. Five tier gopura, shrines of Durga, Dakshinamurthy and Sanisvara got new shrines. A new shrine for Navagraha was built. The vimanas of presiding deity and the goddess got a fresh look.
