= Sundaresvarar Temple, Vadiveesvaram =

Temple in Tamil Nadu, India

Sundaresvarar Temple is a Hindu temple dedicated to the deity Shiva, located at Vadiveesvaram in Nagercoil in Kanyakumari district, Tamil Nadu, India.

== Vaippu Sthalam ==
It is one of the shrines of the Vaippu Sthalams sung by Tamil Saivite Nayanar Appar. This place is also known as Narkundram. As Devi, the Goddess, worshipped here, this place is known as Deveesvaram.

== Presiding deity ==
The presiding deity in the garbhagriha, represented by the lingam, is known as Sundaresvarar. The Goddess is known as Alagesvari.

== Specialities ==
In old texts the name of the presiding deity is mentioned as Deveesvarar. On the Dwajasthambam rasis along with Navagraha are found. The front mandapa has the Kerala type roof. In the inscriptions there are references about the grants given to the temple. Vadivu means beautiful. The place name got Vadiveesvaram combining the name of the Lord, Esvaran. Likewise the Goddess is also known as Vadiveesvari.The temple is found on the right side of Pazhaiyar river. Locals call the goddess as beautiful goddess, known as Alagamman. As in Madurai, Goddess get prominent place here. Sambandar praises the deity as Alagan, the beautiful Lord.

== Structure ==
The temple is facing east. Very near to the temple, tank is found. In front of the presiding deity nandhi is found. In the south prakara Appar, Sambandar, Sundarar, Manickavasagar, Seraman Perumal, Meikandar, Chandresvarar, Vinayaka and Subramania are found. In the south west corner Vinayaka and Subramania are found. Next to them Vishnu, Nagaraja and Kasi Visvanathar are seen. Chandra and Surya are found facing the presiding deity. In the inner prakara, in the south west, Vinayaka is found.

== Location ==
The temple is located at Nagercoil, in a street very near to the bus stand.
