= Brahmapurisvarar Temple, Vilathotti =

Shiva temple in Tamil Nadu, India

Brahmapurisvarar Temple is a Siva temple in Vilathotti in Mayiladuthurai district in Tamil Nadu (India).

== Vaippu Sthalam ==
It is one of the shrines of the Vaippu Sthalams sung by Tamil Saivite Nayanar Appar.

== Presiding deity ==
The presiding deity is known as Brahmapurisvarar. The Goddess is known as Itsurasanayaki.

== Valarthottil ==
Now this place is known as Valarthottil and Vilathotti.
