= Koranattukarupur =

- village
- Country: India
- State: Tamil Nadu
- District: Thanjavur
- Taluk: Kumbakonam

Population (2001)
  - Total: 8,135

Languages
  - Official: Tamil
- Time zone: UTC+5:30 (IST)
- Telephone code: 0435
- Vehicle registration: TN-49

Koranattukarupur is a village in the Kumbakonam taluk of Thanjavur district, Tamil Nadu, India.

== Demographics ==
As per the 2001 census, Koranattukarupur had a total population of 8,135 with 4,030 males and 4,105 females. The sex ratio was 975. The literacy rate was 78.22
