= Sundaresvarar Temple, Tiruloki =

Shiva temple in Tamil Nadu, India

Sundaresvarar Temple, Tiruloki, is a Siva temple in Tiruloki, in Thiruvidaimarudur Taluk in Thanjavur District in Tamil Nadu (India). It is at a distance of 5 km from Thiruppanandal. This place was called as Emanallur.

== Vaippu Sthalam ==
It is one of the shrines of the Vaippu Sthalams sung by Tamil Saivite Nayanar Appar.

== Presiding deity ==
The presiding deity is known as Sundaresvarar. His consort is known as Akilandeswari. The sculpture of Siva with his consort on nandhi is very beautiful in this temple.
