= Brahmapurisvarar Temple, Esanur =

Temple in Tamil Nadu, India

Brahmapurisvarar Temple, Esanur, is a Siva temple in Melai Esanur, next to Keezhaiyur in Nagapattinam-Thiruthuraipoondi road in Nagapattinam District in Tamil Nadu (India).

The presiding deity is known as Brahmapurisvarar. His consort is known as Sugantha Kunthalambigai. Her shrine in the small structure is found next to presiding deity.
