= Brahmapurisvarar Temple, Thiruppattur =

Shiva temple in Tamil Nadu, India

Brahmapurisvarar Temple, Thiruppattur is a Siva temple in Thiruppattur in Trichy district in Tamil Nadu (India).

== Vaippu Sthalam ==
It is one of the shrines of the Vaippu Sthalams sung by Tamil Saivite Nayanar Appar and Sundarar. This place was known as Pidavur.

== Presiding deity ==
The presiding deity is Brahmapurisvarar. The Goddess is known as Brahmanayaki.

== Speciality ==
Though this is a Siva Temple, it is famous for the Brahma shrine found in the temple.
