= Srimoolanathar Temple, Keezhaiththanjavur =

Shiva temple in Tamil Nadu, India

Srimoolanathar Temple is a Hindu temple dedicated to the deity Shiva, located at Keezhaiththanjavur in Nagapattinam district, Tamil Nadu, India.

== Vaippu Sthalam ==
It is one of the shrines of the Vaippu Sthalams sung by Tamil Saivite Nayanar Sundarar. This place is also known as Keelatthanjavur and Marukal Nattu Thanjai.

== Presiding deity ==
The presiding deity in the garbhagriha, represented by the lingam, is known as Srimoolanathar. The Goddess is known as Akilandesvari.

== Specialities ==
This is the birthplace of Seruthunai Nayanar. The presiding deity was worshipped by Seruthunai Nayanar and Kalarsinga Nayanar. Sundarar praises the deity in his song 'Thazhalum Meniyar'. The deity likes this place and other places such as Chotruthurai, Pazhalam, Pambani, Pamburam and Thanjakkai. Seruthunai Nayanar was born in the Chola country. He was an ardent Shiva devotee. He expressed all his thoughts at the feet of Shiva. He did yeoman service to Shiva devotees. Those who commit any wrong to the Shiva followers will be punished by him. He also worshipped Thyagaraja of Thiruvarur and did service. Once when Seruthunai Nayanar was sitting in the mandapa of the temple, wife of Pallava king Kadavarkon Kalarsingan, smelt the flower which was meant for the puja of the deity. Enraged over the incident Nayanar cut off the nose of the wife of the king and informed this to him. On seeing the devotion to the deity he was impressed. Shiva blessed one and all. Later he attained the feet of Shiva.

== Structure ==
On either side of the temple, temple tanks are found. The shrine of Seruthunai Nayanar is also found in this temple. In the prakara shrines of Bairava, Mahalakshmi, Chandra and Sanisvara. Very near to this temple, a temple connected with Ramayanam is found. In that temple five lingams worshipped by Panchapandavas are found. There is also lingas worshipped by Rama.

== Location ==
The temple is located near Putthakaram bridge in Tiruvarur-Tirumarugal-Kangalanjeri-Tiruppayatthangudi route. Town buses are plying from Tiruvarur to Tirumarugal. From Tirumarugal, Keelatthanjavur can be reached. From Tiruppayatthangudi, in east, at a distance of 3.5 km. Keelatthanjavur is situated. This temple is opened for worship from 8.00 a.m. to 10.00 a.m. and 4.00 p.m. to 7.00 p.m.
