= Neeneri Nathar Temple =

Religion
- Affiliation: Hinduism
- District: Tiruvarur
- Deity: Lord (Shiva),

Location
- Location: Thandalachery
- State: Tamil Nadu
- Country: India

Neeneri Nathar Temple is a Hindu temple located at Thandalachery in the Tiruvarur district of Tamil Nadu, India. The presiding deity is Shiva. Thandalachery is located 17 kilometres from Tiruvarur on the road to Thiruthiraipoondi.

== History ==
The temple was constructed by the Early Chola king Kocengannan who was cured of leprosy at this place. The village of Kannandangudi had served as a Chola capital.

== Significance ==
Thandalachery is the birthplace of the Saivite saint Arivattaya Nayanar one of the 63 Nayanmars. The temple is frequented by people afflicted with leprosy. The Saivite saint Sambandar had sung praises of the temple.
