= Idangazhi Nayanar Temple, Kodumbalur =

Idangazhi Nayanar Temple is a Hindu temple dedicated to the deity Shiva, located at Kodumbalur in Pudukottai district, Tamil Nadu, India.

== Rule of the King ==
Konadu, the kingdom had the blue long cloth of sea with its tidal foldings. It looked like embracing the body of the girl of ground. Its capital was Kodumbalur. It runs along with the pleasant chirping of birds that roam around the cool ponds. The king Idangazhi the renowned, other than to the Emperor on the earth chariot who burnt down the three forts into heaps of ash, would not bow down to anybody even in dreams. It is the speciality of Shiva. He had much love on the deity. He offered to do whatever services required for the cause of the devotees. The king with his Vedic knowledge made his kingdom a peaceful and pleasant place. He offered the Agamic worships everyday in His enlightening abodes of the kingdom. His birth place was Kodumbalur.

== Service to Shiva ==
Idangazhi Nayanar, was a king who ruled with the capital city Kodumbalur. He built many temples and contributed much for the cause of Shiva-worship. He favoured a man who stole paddy and offered him much by opening the paddy repository. A Shiva devotee who belonged to this place did puja continuously to Shiva. Once he was left with nothing. In order to continue the puja he stole the paddy bags from the palace of the king Idangazhi Nayanar. The king learned that he stole to offer them to the deity. Then he not only released him and opened the paddy repository and offered him as much as he wants. He informed the people of his country of this. So many Shiva devotees came and took the paddy. On seeing them he felt happy. The speciality of the king was the understanding of the devotees problems and the splendid serving tendency.

== Temple ==
Some years back a temple was built for him. Later renovation work was done and puja was done to him. Aiyppasi Karthigai is also celebrated in this temple.

== Location ==
This temple is located at Trichy-Madurai road, next to Viralimalai. It is situated at a distance of 1 km north of the Trichy Chatram bus stand. The Mukundesvarar Temple is also nearby to the north.
