= Tirunatyattankudi Rathnapureeswarar Temple =

Religion
- Affiliation: Hinduism
- District: Tiruvarur
- Deity: Lord Shiva

Location
- Location: Tirunattiyathankudi in Tiruvarur district
- State: Tamil Nadu
- Country: India

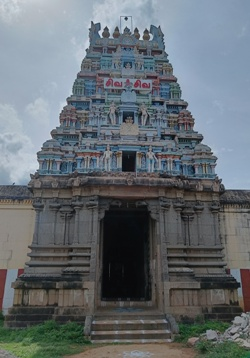
Rajagopura

Tirunatyattankudi Rathnapureeswarar Temple is a Hindu temple located at Tirunattiyathankudi in Tiruvarur district, Tamil Nadu, India. The temple is dedicated to Shiva, as the moolavar presiding deity, in his manifestation as Rathnapureeswarar. He is also known as Manikkavannar. His consort, Parvati, is known as Mangalambikai.

== Structure ==
In the temple rajagopura, Dhwaja Stambha and nandhi found. In the prakara shrines of Kotpuli Nayanar, Gnanasambandar, Navukkarasar, Sundarar, Manikkavacakar, Vinayaka, Muruga with Valli and Deivanai, Kasi Visvanathar, Visalakshi, Gajalakshmi, Sandikesvara are found. In the kosta, Vinayaka, Dakshinamurti, Lingodbhava, Brahma and Durga are found. Shrine of the goddess is found in the left side of the sanctum sanctorum of the presiding deity. Just in front of the rajagopura, shrine of Vinayaka is found outside the temple.

== Significance ==
It is one of the shrines of the 275 Paadal Petra Sthalams - Shiva Sthalams glorified in the early medieval Tevaram poems by Tamil Saivite Nayanar Sundarar.
