= Ujjain Mahaliamman Temple, Thanjavur =

Hindu temple at Thanjavur, Tamil Nadu, India

Ujjain Mahaliamman Temple
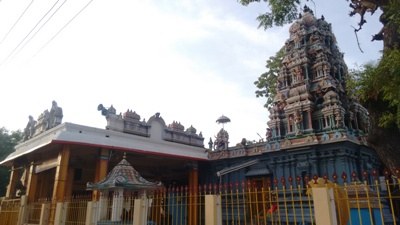

Religion
- Affiliation: Hinduism
- District: Thanjavur district

Location
- Location: Thanjavur
- State: Tamil Nadu
- Country: India

The Ujjain Mahaliamman Temple is a Hindu temple located at Thanjavur in the state of Tamil Nadu, India.

== Location ==
The temple of goddess is one of the famous temples in Thanjavur district. The temple is located in East Gate area of Thanjavur. This temple is very near to Vellai Vinayakar Temple.

== Structure ==
The Sula, the bali pitham, and lion are found facing the presiding deity. The entrance to the main shrine is flanked with Vinayaka at the right and Subramania with his consorts Valli and Deivanai at the left side. In the prakara, Yenathi Nayanar, Durga, Ayyappan, Hanuman, the neem tree, Nāga and Navagraha are found.

== Presiding deity ==
In the garbhagriha, the presiding deity Ujjain Mahaliamman is found in sitting posture, facing east.

== Legend ==
Once members belonging to a family came to Thanjavur for carrying out business, accompanied by a ten-year-old girl and her brother. They halted in a hut, very near to the place where the present temple structure was found. The family members went outside leaving the girl inside. On return they found their hut was found locked from inside. In spite of repeated calls the door was not opened. When they broke the entrance gate and gathered entry, to their shock they saw a girl in the form of a sculpture. Later they started to construct a temple and worship her.

== Kumbhabhishekham ==
The Kumbhabhishekham of this temple was held during 1989 and 2008. The third kumbhabhishekham of the temple took place on 10 February 2023.
