= Dikshitar =

Vedic Shaiva Brahmin servitor community of Tamil Nadu, India

Dīkṣitar
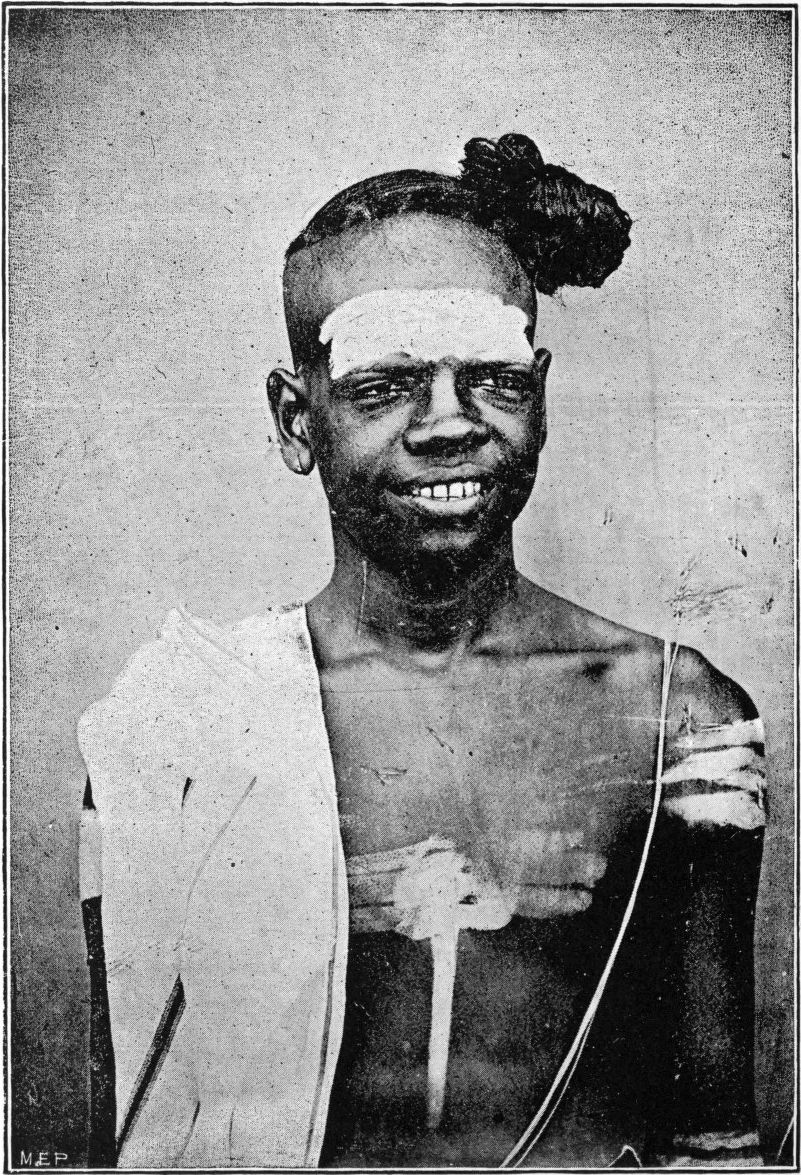
- 1909 photograph depicting the traditional Dīkṣitar munkuḍumi, alternately known as pūrvaśikhā, and in English, a forelock
- Classification: Pancha Dravida
- Veda: Ṛgveda (Āśvalāyana recension); Yajurveda (Baudhāyana recension)
- Religions: Hinduism, Vedic Shaivism
- Languages: Sanskrit, Tamil
- Country: India
- Original state: Tamil Nadu
- Related groups: Iyer Brahmin, Nambūdiri Brahmin, Śōḻiya Brahmin
- Kingdom (original): Chola Empire

Dīkṣitars or Thillai Vazh Anthaanar are a Vedic Shaiva Brahmin servitor community of Tamil Nadu, India, who are based mainly in the town of Chidambaram. Smartha (especially the Vadamas), Sri Vaishnava and other Brahmins in South India also carry the surname Dikshitars, but are different from the Chidambaram Dikshitar.

They are an exclusive group of Brahmins learned in the Vedas and yagnas (sacrifices) who also serve as the hereditary trustees of the Nataraja temple in Chidambaram. They are also called Thillai Muvayiravar or the Three Thousand of Thillai. Every Dikshitar once he is married becomes as of right a trustee and archaka of the Nataraja temple. A practice unique to the community is that the priests wear the tuft of hair in front of the head similar to the Nambuthiri Brahmans of Kerala.

== History ==
The Dikshithars might be traced back to the first line of Brahmanas who migrated to South India from the north, this migration happened as the result of the increasing spread of Jainism and Buddhism in the North.The establishment of Mauryan, Satavahana and Kadamba rule in South India also necessitated the movement of Brahmans into the new regions because these kingdom required trained ritualists. They are mentioned in the 12th century work, the Periyapuranam of Sekkizhar. They were originally the ritual arbiters of imperial legitimacy in the Chola Empire, ritually crowning successive monarchs. This honour was reserved only for rulers belonging to the Chola dynasty. When Kutruva Nayanar, a chieftain of Kalandai became very powerful as a result of his conquests, he requested the 3000 of Tillai to crown him as king of the Chola country but they declined saying that they would only crown a Chola and instead fled to the Chera country to escape his wrath.

In order that he who conquered the world (Kutruvar) may not be bereft of a royal crown he requested the crowning services of the ancient three thousand servitor priests at Chidambaram (Thillai). Thereupon the priests refused the same saying that they are entitled to perform the ceremony only to the most deserving of the ancient clan of Sembiyars (Cholas). Having said this, they quit their dwelling to reach the hill country (Kerala) of the ancient Chera king.

- Periyapuranam

It is also of interest to note that Kulottunga Chola I, during his rule, introduced priests from Vengi, his original homeland, to perpetuate the myth of the Tillai three thousand in order to legitimize his royal and priestly power.

== See also ==
- Dikshit, a Hindu family name
