= Padikasu Nathar Temple =

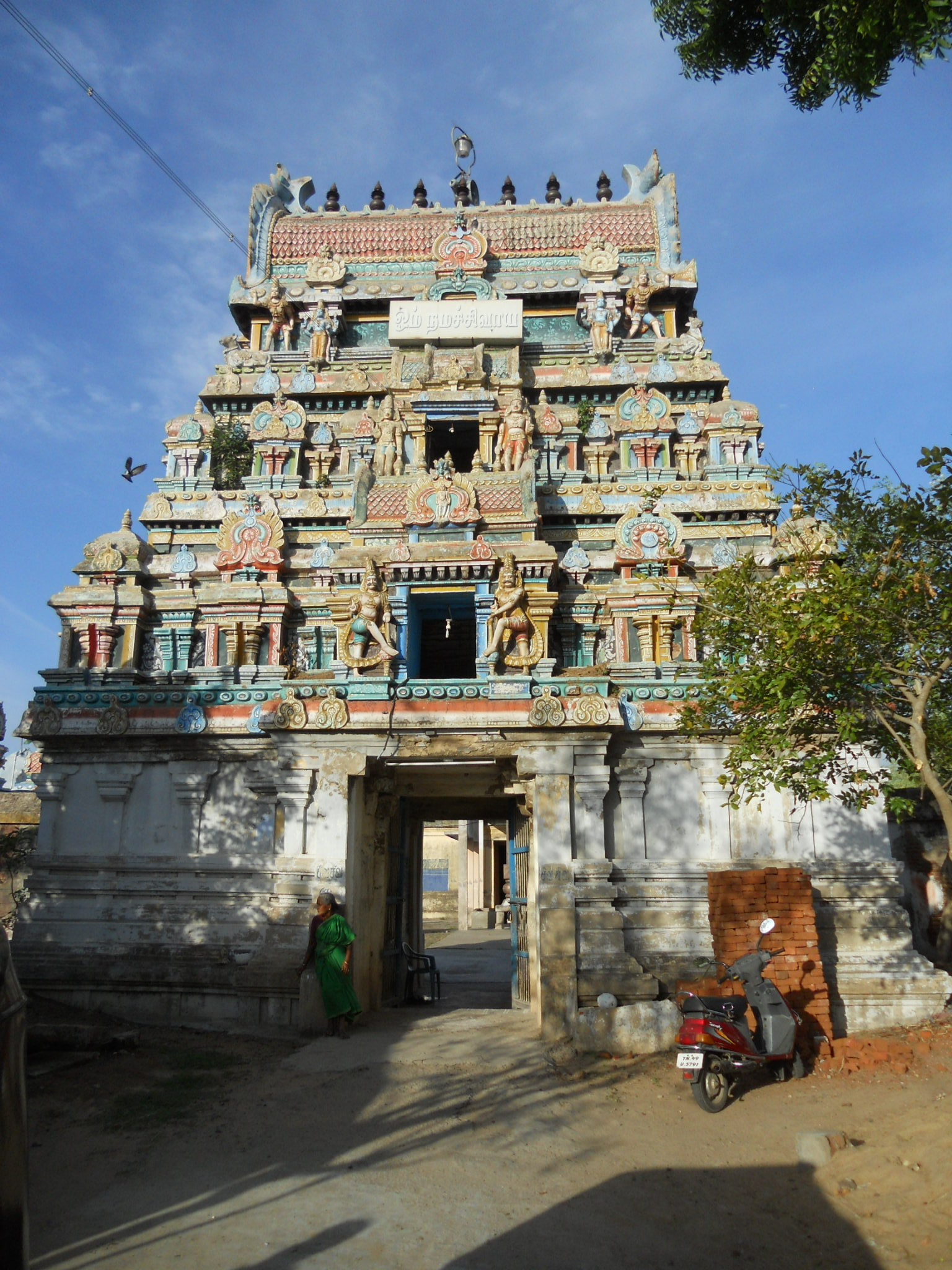

Religion
- Affiliation: Hinduism
- District: Thanjavur
- Deity: Padikasu Nathar (Shiva) Soundaranayagi (Parvathi)

Location
- Location: Alagaputhur
- State: Tamil Nadu
- Country: India
- Interactive map of Padikasu Nathar Temple
- Coordinates: 10°55′48.92″N 79°25′46.26″E

Architecture
- Type: Dravidian architecture
- Creator: Thanjavur Cholas

Padikasu Nathar Temple (also called Swarnapureeswarar Temple) is a Hindu temple located at Azhagaputhur, a village in the Thanjavur district of Tamil Nadu, India. Shiva is worshiped as Padikasunathar, and is represented by the lingam. His consort Parvati is depicted as Soundaranayagi. The presiding deity is revered in the 7th century Tamil Saiva canonical work, the Tevaram, written by Tamil saint poets known as the nayanars and classified as Paadal Petra Sthalam. The 8th century Saiva saint poet Sundarar has sung praise about the temple in his works.

The temple is associated with Pugalthunai Nayanar, one of the 63 Nayanmars, whose birth place was Alagaputhur. There are various inscriptions associated with the temple indicating contributions from Cholas. The present masonry structure was built during the Chola dynasty in the 9th century, while later expansions are attributed to Thanjavur Nayaks during the 16th century.

The temple is built in Dravidian architecture with a three-storied gopuram, the gateway tower. The temple has numerous shrines, with those of Padikasunathar and Soundaranayagi being the most prominent. The temple complex houses many halls and two precincts. The temple has four daily rituals at various times from 6:30 a.m. to 8 p.m., and two yearly festivals on its calendar.

== Legend ==
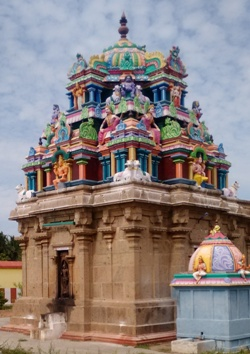
Vimana of the presiding deity

Praises of the temple have been sung in the Thevaram. Alagaputhur is the birthplace of Pugalthunai Nayanar, one of the 63 Nayanmars. As per legend, Pugazh Thunai was a poor farmer, but a staunch devotee of Shiva, used to bring pots of water for the ablution of the presiding deity of the temple. During a year, there was heavy famine in the region and people were suffering. Pugazh Thunai still continued his service of offering water. On account of his old age and senility, he feel sick and fell over the image of the presiding deity. He prayed to Shiva to relieve the people off the suffering. Shiva was pleased by his devotion and started offering a coin (called padikasu in Tamil) daily on account of which both the saint and the region were relieved. He continued his service and Shiva considered him one among the 63 nayanmars on account of his unflinching devotion.

== History ==
The temple finds mention in historical records as a Maadakoil built by Kochengat Chola. An inscription on the northern wall of the central shrine (ARE 283 of 1908) that the temple was built by Pullai Sattan Karivelar Gandaradittan alias Mummadi-Solvarayyar and offered lands to the temple. An inscription (ARE 283 of 1908) dated to the 22nd regnal year of Rajaraja I indicates a gift of land to the temple by Tirupattur Mahadevar. Another inscription (ARE 283 of 1908) from the 28th regnal year indicates gift of lamps to the temple. The record (ARE 289 of 1908) of building the shrine of Suryadevar and a gift of land was made during the fourth regnal year of Rajendra I. The temple was reconstructed using stone during the period of Rajaraja, but was seemingly rebuilt during the start of 20th century.

== Architecture ==
The Padikasu Nathar Temple is located in the village of Alagaputhur which is situated at a distance of 6 kilometres from Kumbakonam on the way to Tiruvarur in Thanjavur district in the South Indian state of Tamil Nadu. There are shrines to Shiva, Vishnu and Murugan. The idol of Shiva is a swayambhumurthy. There are images of Surya and Chandra close to entrance tower indicating the legend that both of them worshiped Shiva at this place. The temple has two precincts and all the shrines are enclosed in concentric granite walls. The temple is approached through a three tiered gateway tower on the eastern side. The sanctum is located axial to the gateway tower and the flagstaff located ahead of the entrance tower. The presiding deity in the form of lingam is housed in the sanctum. The shrine of the consort is located in a south facing shrine close to the sanctum. The image of Sundarar and Paravai Nachiyar is housed in the hall leading to the sanctum.

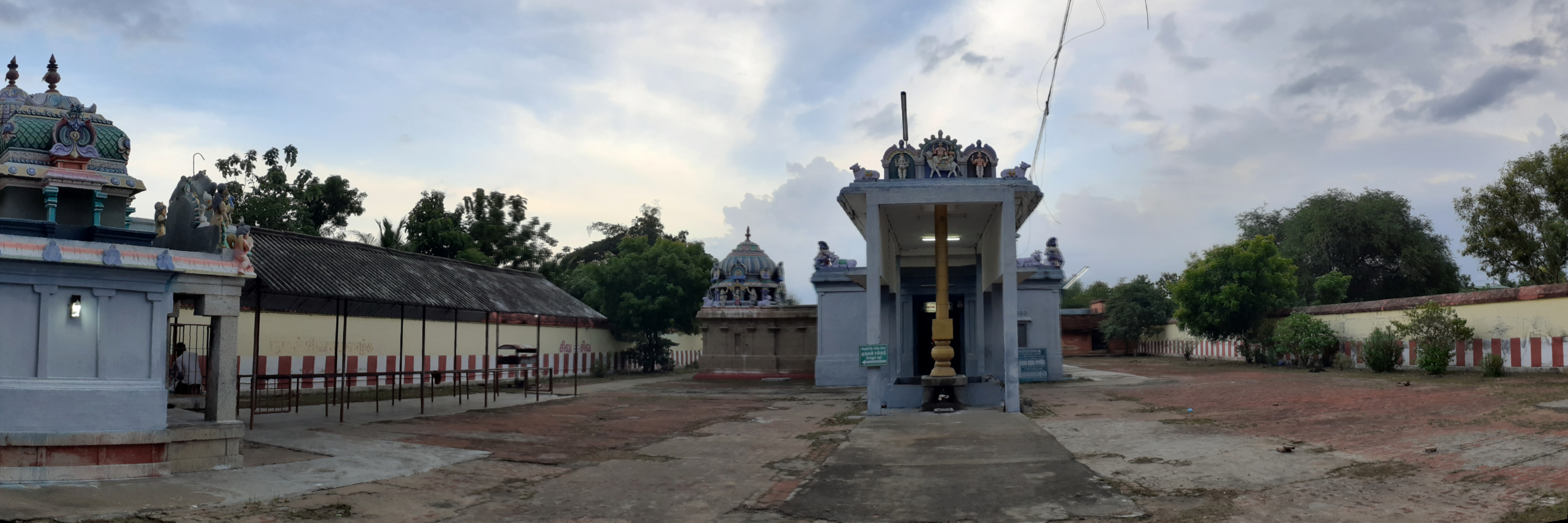
Panoramic view of Padikasu Nathar temple.

== Worship and festivals ==
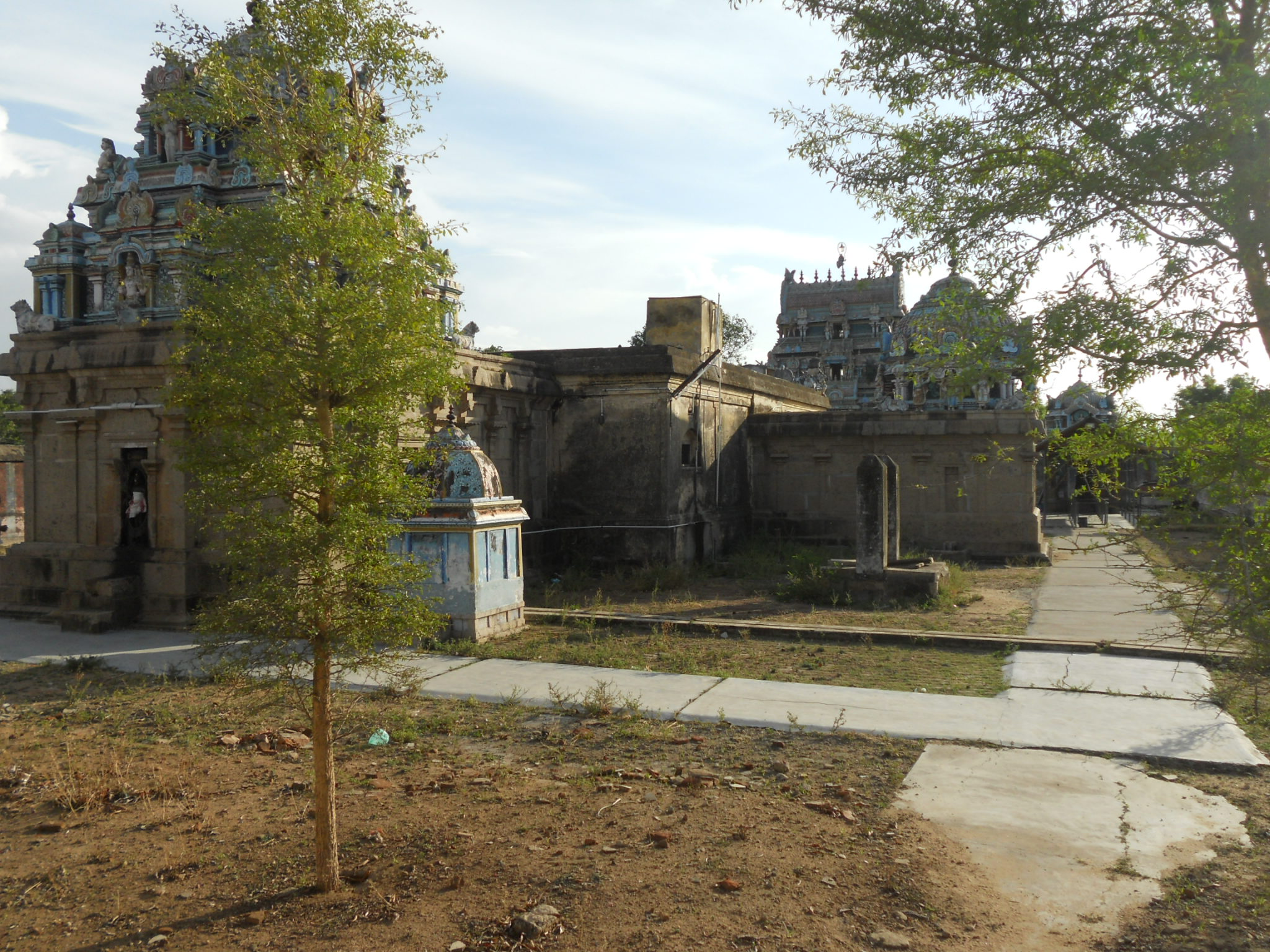
Shrines inside the temple

The temple priests perform the pooja (rituals) during festivals and on a daily basis. Like other Shiva temples of Tamil Nadu, the priests belong to the Shaivaite community, a Brahmin sub-caste. The temple rituals are performed six times a day; Ushathkalam at 6:30 a.m., Uchikalam at 12:00 p.m., Sayarakshai at 6:00 p.m., and Ardha Jamam at 8:00 p.m. Each ritual comprises four steps: abhisheka (sacred bath), alangaram (decoration), neivethanam (food offering) and deepa aradanai (waving of lamps) for both Mahalingeswarar and Pirguchuntaragujambigai. There are weekly rituals like somavaram and sukravaram, fortnightly rituals like pradosham and monthly festivals like amavasai (new moon day), kiruthigai, pournami (full moon day) and sathurthi. The most prominent festival of the temple, Maasimagam, is celebrated for ten days during the Tamil month of Maasi (February - March). The festival deity of Padikasunathar and his consort circumambulate the temple and the streets in the village in different vehicles. The other festivals in the temple are Nayanmar Guru Puja and Asesha Ayilya

== In literature ==
It is one of the 275 Paadal Petra Sthalams - Shiva Sthalams glorified in the early medieval Tevaram poems by Tamil Saivite Nayanar saints Tirunavukkarasar and Thirugnana Sambandar. The temple is revered in the verses of Tevaram, the 7th century saivite canonical work by the three saint poets namely, Appar, Sampantar and Sundarar. Appar has glorified the temple in five, Sundarar in one and Sambandar in six verses. There are nine holes in front of the presiding deity in the sanctum indicating that the planets come in the form of Vayu. Unlike other temples where Sun and Moon face east, but in this temple, they face each other. It is believed that the temple priests are heirs of Pugazhthunai Nayanar. As a worship practice, devotees places two coins at the pedestal of the presiding deity and take one back as a talisman.
