= Pugazh =

Pugazh may refer to:

- Pugazh (actor) (born 1990), Indian actor and comedian
- Pugazh (film), 2016 Tamil-language film
- Pugazh Thunai Nayanar, Nayanar saint, venerated in the Hindu sect of Shaivism
