= Kari Nayanar =

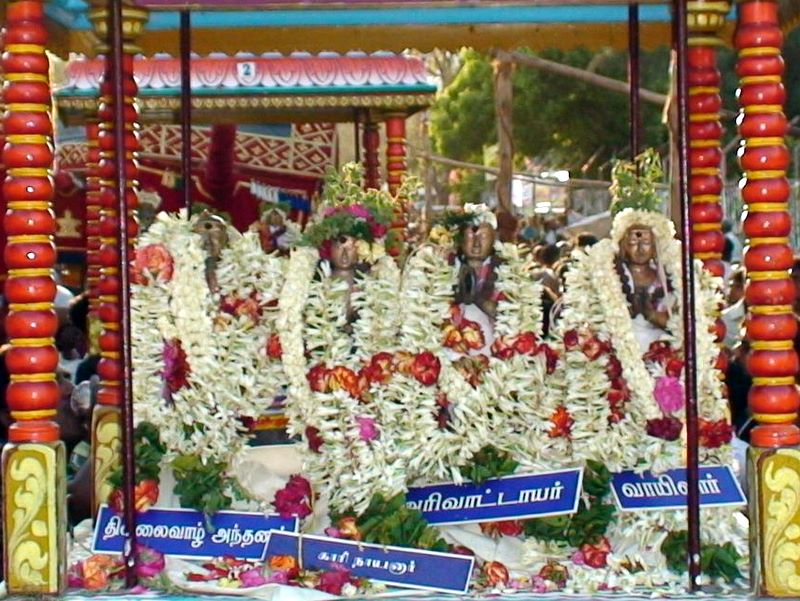
- thillaivazh andhanar ("thogai adiyar"), Kaari nayanar, Arivattaya nayanar, Vaayilaar

Personal life
- Born: Kari Tirukadavur
- Honors: Nayanar saint,

Religious life
- Religion: Hinduism
- Philosophy: Shaivism, Bhakti

Kari Nayanar is the 47th Nayanar saint. Traditional hagiographies like Periya Puranam (13th century CE) and Thiruthondar Thogai (10th century CE) detail his legendary life and services to the Hindu god Shiva. Kari Nayanar was a vedic Brahmin devotee as well as a Tamil poet with an understanding of Sanskrit. The poet-saint compiled the vedic truths in Kovai(Anthology), a Tamil composition titled Karikkovai. This book is now considered lost. Therefore the saint got the name as Kari Nayanar.

== Hagiography ==
Kari Nayanar was born in a Vedic Brahmin family in Thirukkadaiyur, a coastal town located - 15 km north of Karaikal - on the east coast of Tamil Nadu, where there are Amritaghateswarar - Abirami Temple and the ancient Thirukkadaiyur Mayanam temple. The poet-saint was not only the great Shiva devotee but also a learned scholar. The saint, with the help of his Sanskrit learning and with fair knowledge about the Vedic truths, composed anthologies in praise of Shiva and on Vedic truths. The knowledge of Vedic truths originally compiled in Sanskrit language was disseminated in the easily understandable, rhythmic and music filled Tamil anthology compositions, which melted the entire Tamil regions. The poet-saint also composed anthologies in praise of the monarchs i.e., Chera, Chozha and Pandyan, the rulers of three major Tamil kingdoms. In appreciation of his anthologies, the poet-saint was rewarded with heaps of prize money and gifts. The saint utilized all his earnings for the cause of Saiva services. The poet-saint built many Shiva temples. He also served Shiva devotees. After rendering the prolonged selfless services, the devotion, faith and intense prayers of the poet-saint made him to attain the abode of Shiva.

Tamil month Masi – Puradam Poorvashada, Purvashada, star is widely celebrated as Guru Puja Day of Kari Nayanar.
