= Rudra Pasupathi Nayanar =

Hindu saint

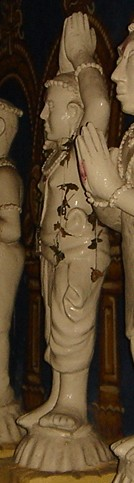

Personal life
- Born: Pasupathi Thiruthalayur
- Honors: Nayanar saint,

Religious life
- Religion: Hinduism
- Philosophy: Shaivism, Bhakti

Rudra Pasupathi Nayanar is the 16th Nayanar saint. Traditional hagiographies like Periya Puranam (13th century CE) and Thiruthondar Thogai (10th century CE) detail his legendary life and services to the Hindu god Shiva. Pasupathi Nayanar was a learned Brahmin devotee who practised chanting of the Shri Rudram Chamakam, a Vedic hymn dedicated to Rudra (a form of Shiva). Therefore, he is known by the name Rudra Pasupathi Nayanar.

== Hagiography ==
Rudra Pasupathi Nayanar was born in a pious Brahmin family in the small village of Thiruthalayur, now located near Musiri, in Tiruchirappalli district of Tamil Nadu state, India. At Thiruthalayur, there is an ancient Shiva temple called Sri Parvati Samedha Sri Baleswarar temple.

Rudra Pasupathi Nayanar was an ardent Shiva devotee. He used go to the water tank in the early morning and evening and chant Shri Rudram Chamakam hymn with folded hands raised above his head. The hymn hails Shiva as the Supreme Being and is believed to accord the reciter Shiva's grace. The vibration of the intense prayer of the Nayanar is described to reach the abode of Shiva, who pleased with the Nayanar's devotion grants him salvation.

Tamil month Purattasi – Ashvini star is widely celebrated as Guru Puja Day of Rudra Pasupathi Nayanar.
