= Nami Nandi Adigal =

Nayanar saint

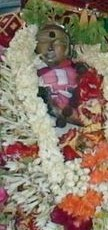

Personal life
- Born: Emapperur, Over a period this name was changed as Thiruneipair
- Honors: Nayanar saint,

Religious life
- Religion: Hinduism
- Philosophy: Shaivism, Bhakti

Nami Nandi Adigal, also spelt as Naminandi adigal, Naminandi adikal and Naminanti Atikal, and also known as Naminandi and Naminandhi, is a Nayanar saint, venerated in the Hindu sect of Shaivism. He is generally counted as the 27th in the list of 63 Nayanars.

== Life ==
The life of Nami Nandi Adigal is described in the Tamil Periya Puranam by Sekkizhar (12th century), which is a hagiography of the 63 Nayanars.

Nami Nandi Adigal was born in the town of Emapperur, near Thiruvarur, which was then part of the Chola kingdom. Emapperur is now located in the Indian state of Tamil Nadu. He was a devotee of the god Shiva, the patron god of Shaivism. He was a Brahmin, member of the priestly caste. Daily, He used to journey to the shrine of Araneri, dedicated to Shiva, in Thiruvarur. This temple is identified as the Sri Achaleswarar (Vandarkuzhali) temple, which is located in the Thyagaraja Temple complex.

Once, when Nami Nandi Adigal reached the Araneri shrine, it was close to evening. He wished to light lamps in the Shiva temple. He went to nearby house and asked for ghee for the lamps. This house happened to be of a Jain. The residents mocked Nami Nandi Adigal saying that why did he want to light lamps for Shiva, who carries fire in his hand. They informed him that they did not have ghee and taunted him that if he was desperate, there was enough water in the temple ponds to light all the lamps. In sorrow, Nami Nandi Adigal returned to the temple and implored God to help him. A heavenly voice instructed him to bring water from the temple tank and pour it in the lamps. He lit the lamps, which burnt brightly till dawn. He returned home in the evening to worship Shiva in his home shrine. The saint would journey from Emapperur to the Araneri shrine everyday, worship in the temple and return to his home-town after lighting the lamps with water in the evening. The Jains saw the miracle in disbelief. While some left Thiruvarur, others embraced Shaivism. The Chola king heard about Nami Nandi Adigal's devotion and appointed him as the head priest of the temple. He also aimed the temple in its celebrations of festivals. The tale of the lamp miracle is also recalled in the 13th-century Telugu Basava Purana of Palkuriki Somanatha with some variation.

Another incident in the life of Nami Nandi Adigal is recorded in the Periya Puranam. In celebration of the festival of Panguni Uttaram, an effigy of Shiva was paraded to the neighbouring village of Tirumanali. People of all castes participated in the procession. Nami Nandi Adigal returned home and did not worship in his home shrine as he had become ritually impure by intermingling with the people of other castes. He ordered his wife to fetch him some water for a ritual bath and waited outside the house. The fatigued priest succumbed to sleep. Shiva appeared in his dream and chastised his behaviour. He reminded Nami Nandi Adigal that all born in Thiruvarur were Shiva-ganas (attendants of Shiva) and their touch could not have defiled his ritual purity. Nami Nandi Adigal woke up from sleep. He regretted his actions and performed the domestic rites, after informing his wife of the vision by Shiva. He went to Thiruvarur the next day as per his daily schedule. As he entered Thiruvarur, he saw all the people in the guise of Shiva. Petrified by the sight, he prostrated before them. As he stood up, the people then appeared to him in their normal forms. Nami Nandi Adigal lived his life serving Shiva and his devotees. He attained Kailash, Shiva's abode, after death.

== Remembrance ==
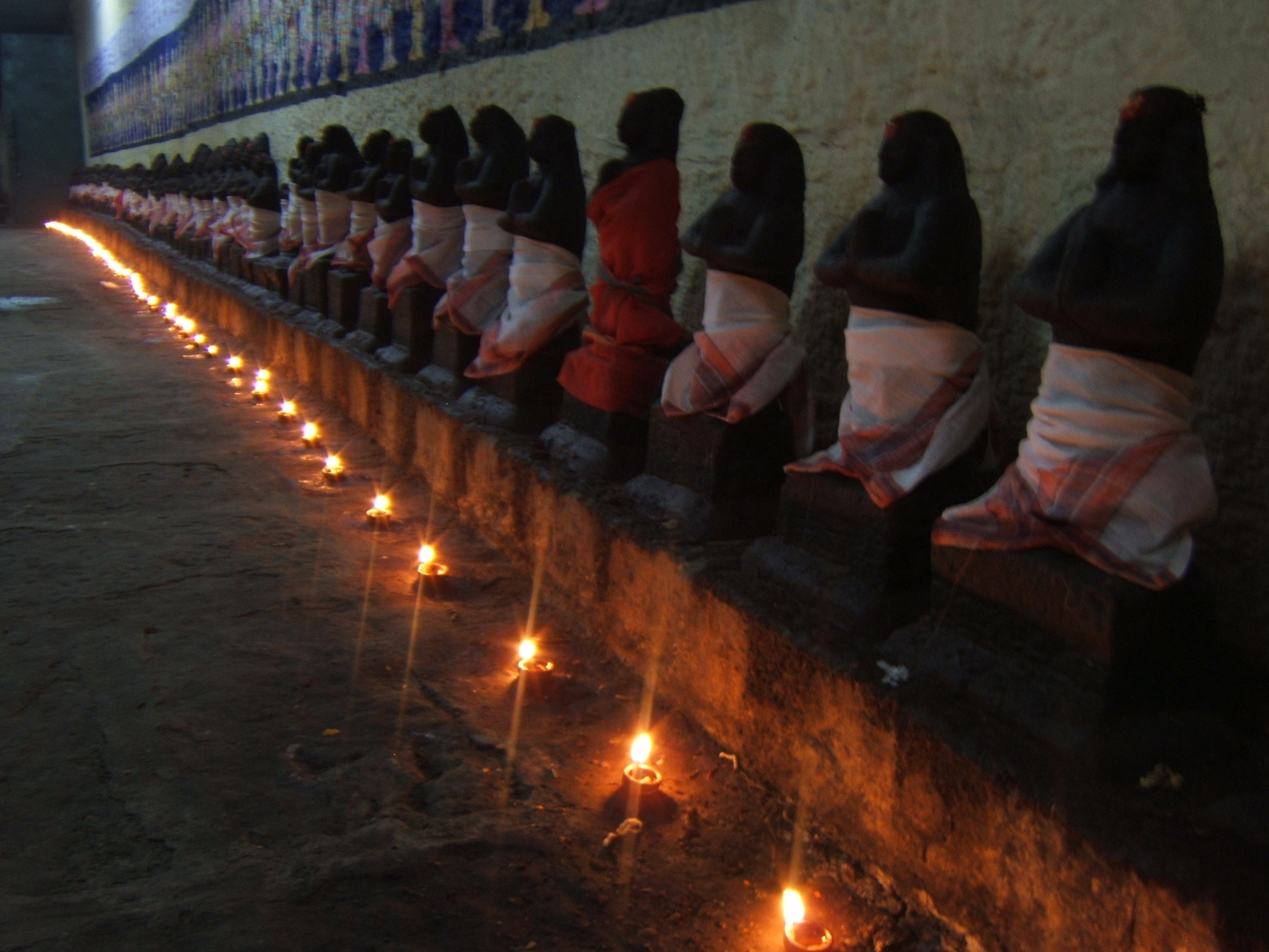
The images of the Nayanars are found in many Shiva temples in Tamil Nadu.

The Airavatesvara Temple, Darasuram (c. 1150) has a relief dedicating the tale of Nami Nandi Adigal, lighting the lamps with water. One of the most prominent Nayanars, Appar Tirunavukkarasar (7th century) also recalls the lamp miracle of Nami Nandi Adigal, called Nambi Nami in the verse. He further praises Nami Nandi Adigal as "pure gold".

Nami Nandi Adigal receives collective worship as part of the 63 Nayanars. Their icons and brief accounts of his deeds are found in many Shiva temples in Tamil Nadu. Their images are taken out in procession in festivals. Nami Nandi Adigal is depicted with folded hands (see Anjali mudra).
