= Yenathinatha Nayanar =

Hindu poet-saint

Yenathinathar

Personal life
- Born: Eyinanur
- Honors: Nayanar saint

Religious life
- Religion: Hinduism
- Philosophy: Shaivism, Bhakti
- Lineage: nadar Clan

Yenathinathar, also known as Yenatinata, Yenathi Nayanar, Yenadhinatha, Yenadinath, Yenadinatha Nayanar and Yenadhinatha Nayanar, was a Nayanar saint hailing from ezhakula Nadar clan, venerated in the Hindu sect of Shaivism. He is generally counted as the ninth in the list of 63 Nayanars. In 1901, P.Sv. Perumal Nadar formed Srimath Yenathinadha Nayanar Thirumadalayam at Aruppukottai

== Life ==
The life of Yenathinathar is described in the Tamil Periya Puranam by Sekkizhar (12th century), which is a hagiography of the 63 Nayanars. His name "Enathinatha" means "Lord of the Generals".

Yenathinathar was born in a Kshatriya family at Eyinanur, in Chola kingdom. Eyinanur is located on the banks of river Arisil, south-east of Kumbakonam in the Indian state of Tamil Nadu. A brilliant swordsman and a general in the Chola military himself, he was also the tutor to the Chola princes in swordsmanship. He was a Shaiva, a devotee of the god Shiva. He became rich owing to his prowess and spent his wealth on serving the devotees of Shiva.

Atisuran, a rival fighter and tutor became jealous of Yenathinathar's popularity. While Atisuran boasted of his superior military skills, his skills were inferior to Yenathinathar's talent. Atisuran came with his best students and kinsmen and challenged Yenathinathar; the winner would continue to run his training school. Yenathinathar accepted and charged towards the opponents with his relatives. With Enathinathar's leadership, his side won the contest, slaying many of Atisuran's comrades. Defeated by Yenathinathar, the cowardly Atisuran himself escaped death by fleeing from the battle grounds. The Periya Puranam repeatedly refers to Yenathinathar as the lion and his opponent Atisuran as the fox. Following this he understood that he could not defeat Yenathinathar by fair means, and (the cowardly and cunning fox) devised a devious stratagem, seeking vengeance.

In morning, Atisuran invited Yenathinathar to a duel in a secluded place. Yenathinathar consented and reached the spot with his sword and shield. Atisuran wore the Tripundra (three horizontal lines of sacred ash) mark on his forehead, which is worn by Shaivas, but hid his forehead with his shield as he arrived at the designed spot. As Yenathinathar (the lion) pounced the "fox", the deceiving rival removed his shield and revealed the Tripundra on his forehead. The stunned Yenathinathar took the Tripundra as a sign that Atisuran had converted to Shaivism and became a devotee of Shiva. Instead of slaying a Shaiva, Yenathinathar decided to die. However, he did not lay down his weapons as he did not want Atisuran - the "Shaiva" - to incur the sin of killing an unarmed man. Yenathinathar stood standstill in a pose as though he was combating, but did make his attempt to fight as he awaited the fatal blow from Atisuran. As Yenathinathar fell on the ground, Shiva - pleased with his extreme "self-sacrificing" devotion - appeared before him and took him to Kailash, Shiva's abode. The tale emphasizes the importance of external Shaiva symbols like the Tripundra symbol and the rudraksha beads worn by Shiavas.

The tale of Yenathinathar (called Yenandhinatha in the account) is also recalled in the 13th-century Telugu Basava Purana of Palkuriki Somanatha in brief and with some variation. He is said to have worshipped his prana-linga (the body considered as the abode of Shiva) by wearing the Tripundra and rudraksha beads. He was the ruler of Elapura and defeated neighbouring kings, making them his vassals and collecting tributes from them. When the kings learnt about his respect for the Tripundra and rudraksha, they sent a warrior wearing the Tripundra and rudraksha with their armies to combat him. When the duel between Yenandhinatha and the warrior commenced, Yenandhinatha noticed the Shaiva symbols and threw his weapons and prostrated to the warrior, who he considered a form of Shiva. As the warrior was about to decapitate the devotee, his sword took the form of a garland and fell onto Yenandhinatha's neck. With the grace of Shiva, Yenandhinatha became invincible and became a powerful ruler.

== Remembrance ==
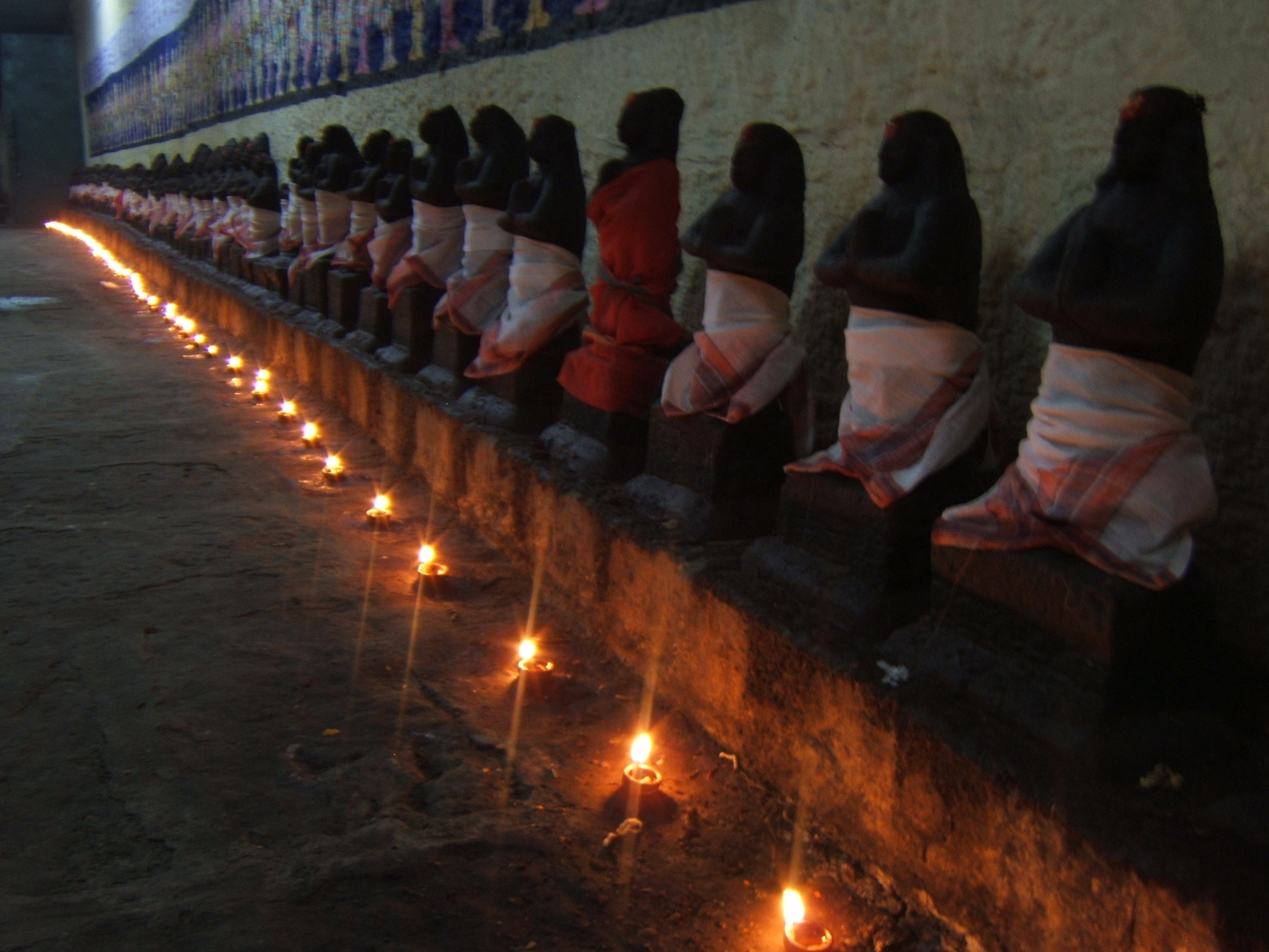
The images of the Nayanars are found in many Shiva temples in Tamil Nadu.

One of the most prominent Nayanars, Sundarar (8th century) venerates Yenathinathar in the Tiruthonda Thogai, a hymn to Nayanar saints.

Yenathinathar is worshipped in the Tamil month of Purattasi, when the moon enters the Uttara Ashadha nakshatra (lunar mansion). He is depicted with folded hands (see Anjali mudra) and holding a sword in the crook of his arm. He receives collective worship as part of the 63 Nayanars. Their icons and brief accounts of his deeds are found in many Shiva temples in Tamil Nadu. Their images are taken out in procession in festivals.
