= Gananatha Nayanar =

Personal life
- Born: Sirkazhi
- Honors: Nayanar saint,

Religious life
- Religion: Hinduism
- Philosophy: Shaivism, Bhakti

Gananatha Nayanar is the 37th Nayanar (saint). Gananatha means the head of the group of Gaṇas or the attendants of Shiva and live in Kailasa (the soldiers of the Shiva) at the abode of the Omnipresent. This pious Shiva devotee was born in a traditional Brahmin family in Sirkazhi. His love towards Toniappar was overwhelming; his faith was surplus and his devotion towards the services of Toniappar was powerful. He enjoyed in rendering a variety of services and also engaged himself in discussing the glory of Toniappar.

== Work as Service to God ==
People had warm feelings for the selfless devotion shown by the saint and often approached him for advice. He trained many people in Shaivism services. Many people were impressed by the perfect services rendered by the saint and expressed interest in rendering perfect service in the Sattainathar Temple, Sirkazhi. People engaged themselves in Shaivism duties like plucking flowers, preparation of flower garlands, fetching holy water for consecration, writing hymns, chanting hymns etc., The saint also provided facilities in the temple complex to make the people feel comfortable while rendering selfless service to the god. They believed that service to god is the ultimate worship.

== In Service of Guru Sambandar ==
Gananatha Nayanar was a contemporary with Sambandar (Tirugnaana Sambandar) who also figure in the 63 Nayanars. The saint was also enjoyed the love and blessings of Sambandar. He had taken Sambandar as his Guru and engaged himself in serving him and his devotees.

== Merging in the Light of Shiva ==
The saint spent his remaining part of his life by rendering Shaivism services. The selfless devotion and faith shown by the saint pleased Shiva and Parvati and they graced the saint with salvation and made him to lead Shiva Ganas. Since it is believed that Gananatha Nayanar was born on Thiruvathirai star Ardra (nakshatra) of the Tamil month Panguni, the specific day is celebrated as Guru Pooja day in all Shiva temples.
