= Sakkiya Nayanar =

Venerated Hindu

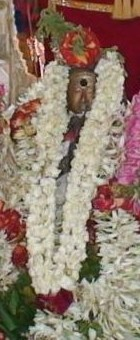

Personal life
- Born: 7th Century CE Tirucchangamangai
- Honors: Nayanar saint

Religious life
- Religion: Hinduism
- Philosophy: Shaivism, Bhakti

Sakkiya Nayanar (c. 7th century CE; known colloquially as Chakkiya Nayanar, Sakkiya, Chakkiya, Sakkiyar, Chakkiyar, and Sakkiyanar) was a Nayanar saint, venerated in the Shaiva sect of Hinduism. He is generally counted as the thirty-fourth in the list of 63 Nayanars. He was a Buddhist, who converted to Shaivism.

== Hagiographical account ==
The life of Sakkiya Nayanar is described in the Periya Puranam by Sekkizhar (12th century), which is a hagiography of the 63 Nayanars. Sakkiya is one of the six Nayanars from the region of Tondai Nadu and lived around the time the Pallava dynasty ruled the area. He is considered a historical figure from the 6th century CE, pre-dating Appar Tirunavukkarasar and Sambandar, both dating from the 7th century CE.

Sakkiya Nayanar was born in Tirucchangamangai/Tiru-changa-mangai (Sangaramangai), Nagapattinam district, Tamil Nadu, India. He was a Vellalar, a caste of agricultural land owners. He gave up worldly life and studied in pursuit of the Truth and attain moksha (emancipation). He went to Kanchipuram and became a Buddhist monk (Bhikshu). He studied Buddhism and became an expert in Buddhist philosophy. He earned the name Sakkiya, originating from Shakya - the clan of the Buddha. However, Buddhism did not relinquish his thirst for knowledge and enlightenment. So, he embraced Shaivism, however, he did not give up the grab of a Buddhist monk and continued to dress in saffron garments as he was convinced that external appearances did not matter for self-realization. Sakkiya is said to have realized that Shaivism was the true path to salvation and became a devotee of the god Shiva, the patron deity of Shaivism. He believed that the Shaiva philosophy of "the deed, doer, its effect and the controller of the effect" was the most accurate and Shiva was the Truth he was seeking.

Sakkiya commenced the worship of the Lingam, Shiva's aniconic symbol. One day, he unconsciously threw a stone at the lingam with great devotion. The next day, Sakkiya felt that it was Shiva's divine wish that he worship Shiva by throwing a stone a day at the lingam as an offering. Sakkiya realized that God will accept any offering which is offered to him with great devotion. Sakkiya would not have food without throwing a stone at the lingam daily. Once, Sakkiya forgot his daily stone worship and was about to partake food. However, he remembered his daily duty and unmindful of hunger, rushed to the temple and threw a pebble at the lingam. Pleased, Shiva appeared before him, blessed him and took him to Kailash, the god's eternal abode.

== Remembrance ==
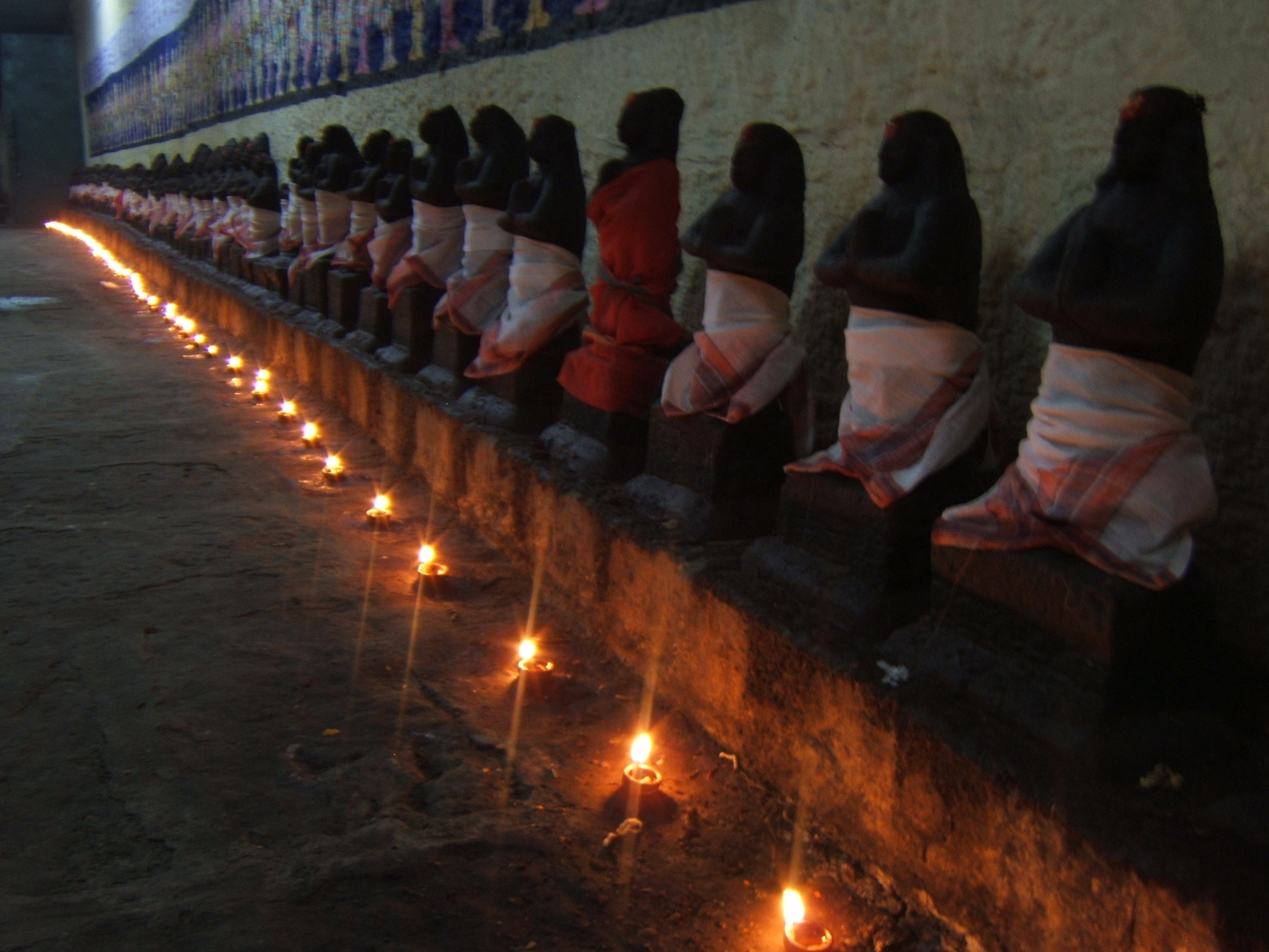
The images of the Nayanars are found in many Shiva temples in Tamil Nadu.

One of the most prominent Nayanars, Appar Tirunavukkarasar (7th century) alludes Sakkiya in a hymn to Shiva where deeds of various saints are recalled. The hymn says how Shiva made Sakkiya worship Him by throwing a stone before having his kanji (porridge) and abandon the eating of rice. Shiva also granted Sakkiya to do service as a Shaivite

Sakkiya Nayanar is depicted with a top-knot or flowing matted hair and with folded hands (see Anjali mudra). A holy day in his honour is observed on the twenty-sixth day of the Tamil month of Margazhi, generally coincides with 10 January. The moon enters the Pūrva Ashādhā nakshatra (lunar mansion) on this day. He receives collective worship as part of the 63 Nayanars. Their icons and brief accounts of his deeds are found in many Shiva temples in Tamil Nadu. Their images are taken out in procession in festivals.
