= Kalarsinga Nayanar =

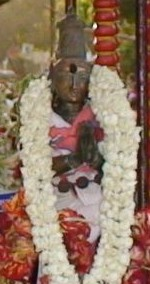

Personal life
- Born: c. 8-9th century CE
- Honors: Nayanar saint,

Religious life
- Religion: Hinduism
- Philosophy: Shaivism, Bhakti

Kalarsinga Nayanar, also known as Kalarsinga, Kazharsinga, Kalarcinkan, Kalarsingan, Kalarsinganar, Kalarsingar, Kalarcingar and Kalar-chingar (Kalar-singar), was a Nayanar saint, venerated in the Hindu sect of Shaivism. He is generally counted as the fifty-fifth in the list of 63 Nayanars. While his identity remains a matter of debate, many scholars identity Kalarsinga Nayanar as the Pallava king Narasimhavarman II (Rajasimha), who reigned between 700 and 728 CE.

== Life ==
The life of Kalarsinga Nayanar is described in the Tamil Periya Puranam by Sekkizhar (12th century), which is a hagiography of the 63 Nayanars. His name "kalarsinga" means "lion with ankled feet".

Kalarsinga was a Pallava king from the Kadava dynasty. He is said to waged wars on foes and conquered kingdoms to the North, becoming an emperor. He was a staunch devotee of the god Shiva, the patron of Shaivism and propagated Shaivism in regions he captured. He went on pilgrimages to many Shiva temples. He journeyed to Thiruvarur and came with his queen consort at the shrine of Araneri, dedicated to Shiva. This temple is identified as the Sri Achaleswarar (Vandarkuzhali) temple, which is located in the Thyagaraja Temple complex. She arrived in the temple hall (mandapa) where various flowers were gathered to use as floral offerings to Shiva as well as create garlands for him. A flower had fallen from the dais where the garlands were made. The queen picked the flower and smelt it. In Hinduism, it is taboo to use or smell flowers meant for God, before they are offered to him. C.K. Subramania Mudaliar's commentary on the Periya Puranam opines the queen was a Samana, whom the king married for political reasons. Though she accompanied the king on official visits to temples, as a non-Hindu, she did not worship Shiva.

Seruthunai Nayanar, another Nayanar, served at the temple noticed the queen's actions. He was enraged by the conduct of the Pallava queen. Ignoring her royal status, he dragged her by her hair and pushed her on the ground. He caught her nose and punished her by severing it. The queen screamed in pain. The infuriated Kalarsinga rushed to her and asked who had dared to assault his queen and challenge his authority. Seruthunai Nayanar took responsibility and explained the rationale of his actions. Kalarsinga deemed the punishment inadequate. With his sword, he chopped off the hand of the queen, by which he lifted the flower. As the devotees in the temple erupted with the cheers of "Hara, Hara" (name of Shiva) lauding his actions, celestial beings shower him with flowers for his just action. Kalarsinga ultimately attained Kailash, Shiva's abode after death.

The tale of Kalarsinga (called Narasinga Nayanaru in the account) is also recalled in the 13th-century Telugu Basava Purana of Palkuriki Somanatha in brief and with some variation. Narasinga is described as a Chola king. Seruthunai Nayanar is replaced with a simple unnamed flower boy. Narasinga is said to first cut the queen's finger, followed by her hand, then her fore arm and finally the entire arm. Shiva appeared and took Narasinga with him to his abode, while he also restored the queen's nose and arm.

== Quotes ==
The Periyapuranam account of Kazharsinga Nayanar, verse 4097:

"Kazhal Singkar, the scion of the Kaatava dynasty, By the grace of the Lord who wields the auric mountain As his bow, waged a war, destroyed his foes, Captured the northern realms and fostered His country establishing it in the way of dharma; Thus he flourished fostering piety"

== Identification and dating ==
One of the most prominent Nayanars, Sundarar (8th century) venerates Kalarsinga Nayanar in the Tiruthonda Thogai, a hymn to Nayanar saints and praising him as Kadava king, who rules over the world bound by the seas. This reference of Kalarsinga as the emperor of the entire world in present tense is interpreted to suggest that Kalarsinga was the reigning king in Sundarar's times.

While generally Kalarsinga is identified as Narasimhavarman II or Rajasimha (reign: 700-728 CE), other contenders are Nandivarman II (reign: 732–796), his son Dantivarman (reign: 796–846) and his grandson Nandivarman III (reign: 846–869). Though the Periya Puranam associates Kalarsinga with only one other Nayanar (Seruthunai Nayanar), another theory suggests that the unnamed king in the narrative of the Nayanar saint Pusalar is also Kalarsinga. The king in the Pusalar tale is generally identified as Narasimhavarman II, the builder of Kailasanathar Temple of Kanchipuram. Like Kalarsinga, Narasimhavarman conquered the Chalukya kingdoms, which were at the North of the Pallava kingdom. The Sundarar reference as well as the conquest of the North is used to identify Kalarsinga as Narasimhavarman. It is suggested that the Nayanars Aiyadigal Kadavarkon Nayanar and Kalarsinga are the father-son duo of Paramesvaravarman I (reign:670–720) and Narasimhavarman II.

Some scholars reject the identification of Kalarsinga as Narasimhavarman II because the Tiruthonda Thogai or Periya Puranam would have explicitly said the same, while disputing Sundarar's dating. They suggest Sundarar lived in the 9th century, when Nandivarman III - who fought the Battle of Tellaru - ruled. However, there is no evidence in his chronicles that he was ever given the title "Kalarsinga".

== Remembrance ==
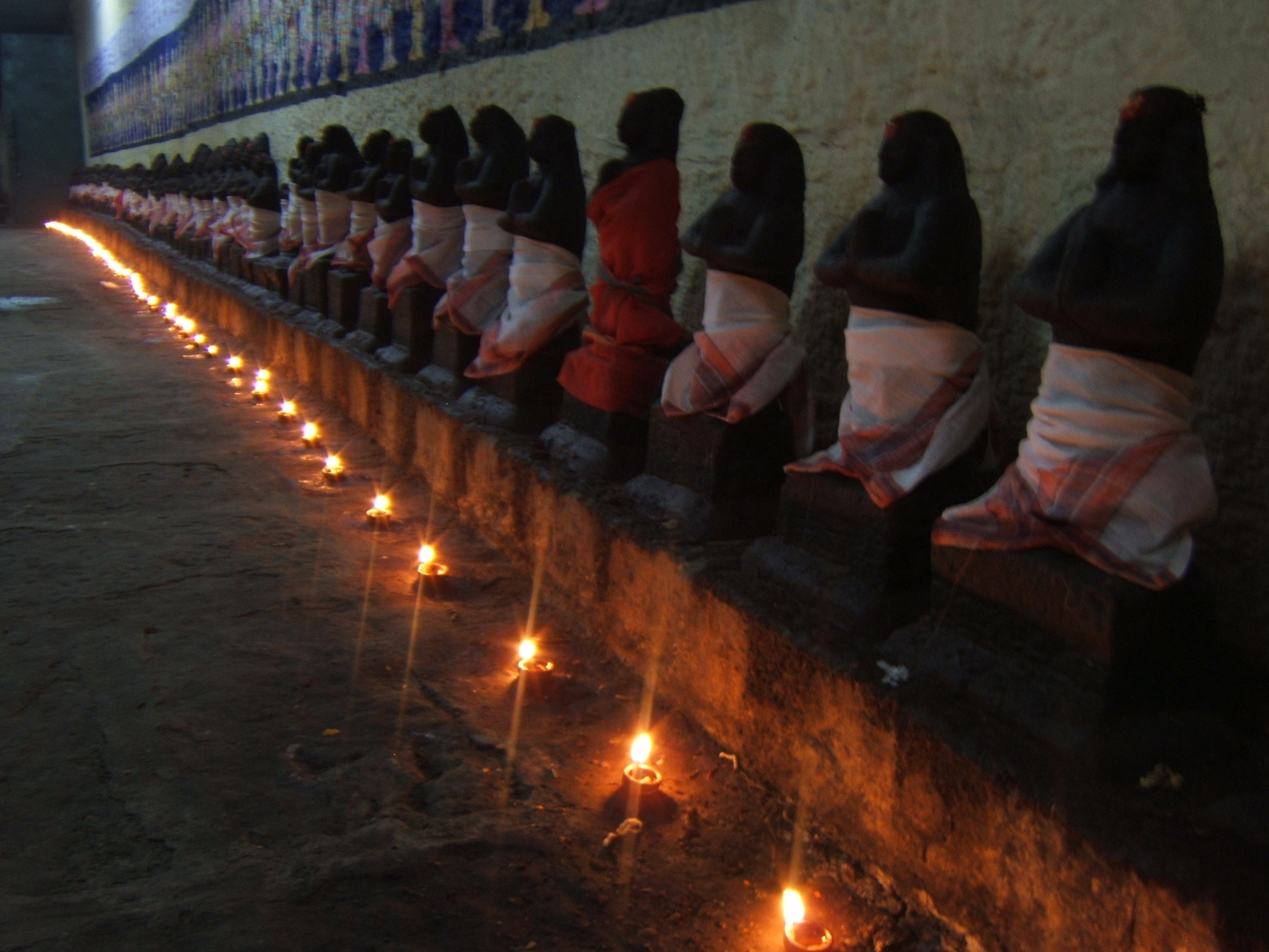
The images of the Nayanars are found in many Shiva temples in Tamil Nadu.

Kalarsinga Nayanar is worshipped in the Tamil month of Vaisakhi, when the moon enters the Bharani nakshatra (lunar mansion). He is depicted as a king with a crown, folded hands (see Anjali mudra) and sometimes a sword in the crook of his arm. He receives collective worship as part of the 63 Nayanars. Their icons and brief accounts of his deeds are found in many Shiva temples in Tamil Nadu. Their images are taken out in procession in festivals.
