= Satti Nayanar =

Satti Nayanar (Shatti Nayanar, Chaththi Nayanar), also known as Satti (Sathi), Sathiyar, Shakti Nayanar, Shakti, Shaktiyar (Saktiyar), Sattiyandar and Thiru-Saththi Nayanar, is a Nayanar saint, venerated in the Hindu sect of Shaivism. He is generally counted as the 45th in the list of 63 Nayanars. Satti Nayanar is described to cut off the tongue of whoever talked ill of his patron god Shiva or Shiva's devotees.

== Life ==
The life of Satti Nayanar is described in the Periya Puranam by Sekkizhar (12th century), which is a hagiography of the 63 Nayanars. Satti Nayanar was a Vellalar, a caste of agricultural land owners. Satti Nayanar belonged to Varinjiyur, presently in Tiruvarur District in the Indian state of Tamil Nadu. Little is known about this Nayanar. He was a devotee of the god Shiva, the patron god of Shaivism and honoured Shaivas, the devotees of Shiva. He did not tolerate any one who spoke ill about Shaivas and cut off the person's tongue. He is said to forcibly pull out the tongues of the "blasphemous sinners" with tongs and cut them off with sharp knife called satti, which gave him his name - Satti Nayanar. Shiva is said to blessed him for his service.

Some Kannada and Sanskrit inscriptions state that Satti Nayanar (sometimes called Shaktinatha) had taken a vow to slay all non-Shaivas, not only those who slandered Shaivas. However, no tradition actually records him killing any individual. Though the blasphemers are not explicitly identified in the narrative, they are interpreted to be Jains or Buddhists. Satti Nayanar may sometimes be depicted severing the tongue of a Jain monk. In folk tradition, he is called Kalacittia.

== Assessment ==
According to Swami Sivananda, the narrative of Satti Nayanar besides exalting the Nayanar saint, also touches upon the topic of blasphemy. The tale teaches that one should not speak ill of, revile or disparage holy men and devotees of God. The narrative emphasizes that not only talking ill of devotees is a sin, but also hearing to such profanity is harmful. Sivananda does not advocate the violent means of the Nayanar, but suggests that one should exit the place immediately, avoiding listening to the blasphemy.

Dr. D. Dennis Hudson, Emeritus Professor of World Religions at Smith College identified twenty-four Nayanars, including Satti Nayanar, displaying "violent and fanatical devotion" and contrasts it with the "saintly devotion" in the Bhagavad Gita. These acts denote the "unusual and paradigmatic" love of the Nayanars for Shiva. The absolute nature of these acts, that go beyond the boundaries of convention and custom, makes them praiseworthy. Satti Nayanar's violence is justified by the maxim: "the sins of the devotees of the Lord are virtues whereas even the good actions performed by those without love are vices." The Nayanar is also excused since the narrative blames the victim to be the instigator of the attack, by his actions.

== Remembrance ==
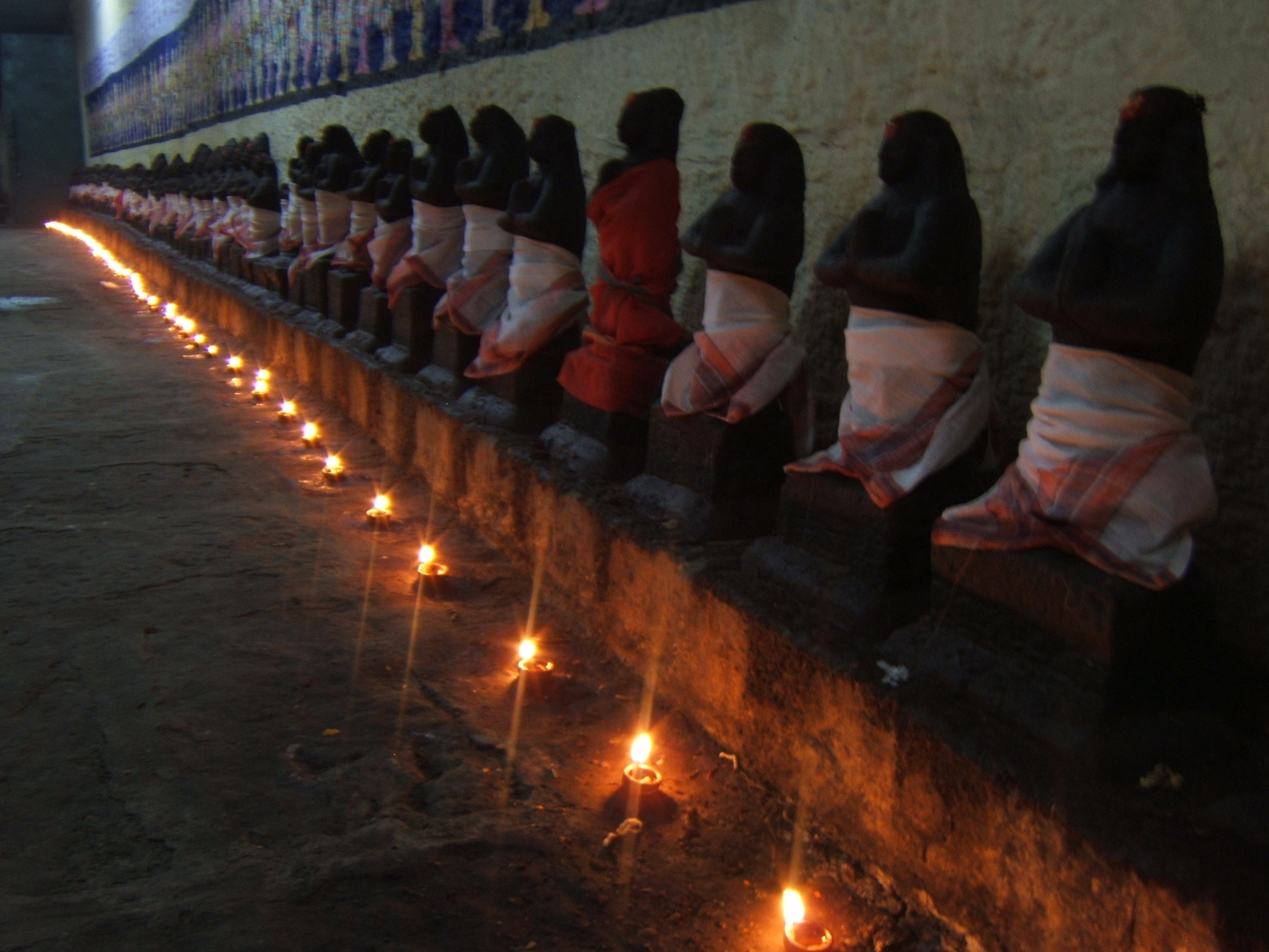
The images of the Nayanars are found in many Shiva temples in Tamil Nadu.

Satti Nayanar may be depicted cutting a person's tongue with a sickle or knife. A stone panel in the Airavatesvara Temple, the 12th-century Shiva temple in Darasuram built by the Chola king Rajaraja Chola II depicts him doing so with a sickle. A shrine in his honour is built in his home town of Varinjiyur.

Satti Nayanar is specially worshipped in the Tamil month of Aippasi, when the moon crossed into the Pushya nakshatra (lunar mansion). He receives collective worship as part of the 63 Nayanars. Their icons and brief accounts of his deeds are found in many Shiva temples in Tamil Nadu. Their images are taken out in procession in festivals.
