= Adipaththar =

Tamil saint

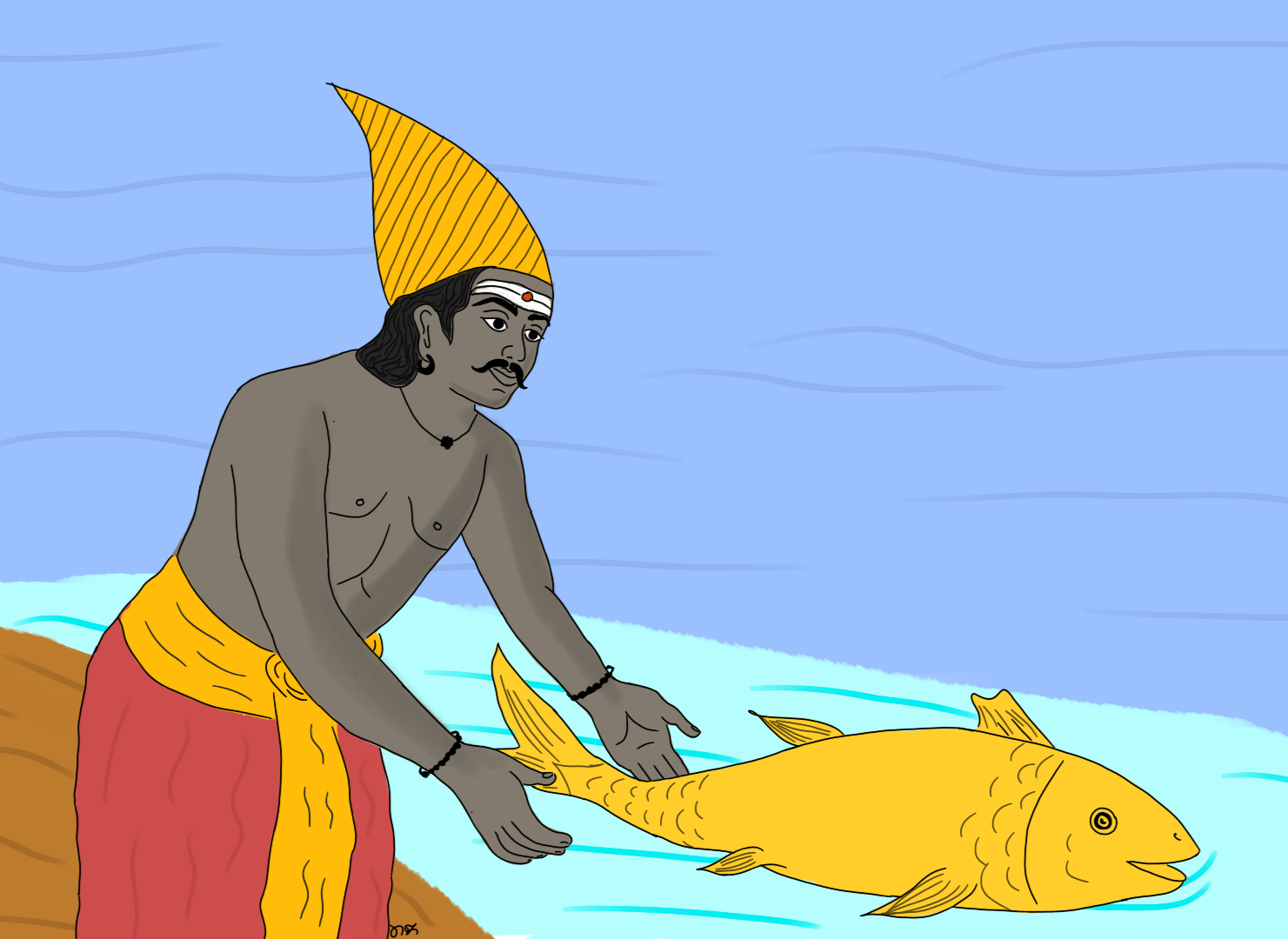

Adipatthar or Adhipattha Nayanar is one of the 63 Nayanmars. He was a sincere devotee of Shiva and lived in the Chola kingdom at present day Nagapattinam (referred in Sangam literature as Naagai) by the sea shore.

== Life ==
Adi Pathar also known as Adi was a fisherman. Every day he used to set a fish free out of his catch in the name of Shiva. He did it even if he got only one fish for the day. To test his devotion, Shiva sent a golden fish as the only and first fish. He did not sway away from his devotion and freed the fish. Pleased by his devotion, Shiva appeared in front of him.

== Literature ==
" The head of Paradhavarfor God. He then got a big golden fish one day which he gave to God happily and thus attained Lord forever" The dancing God of golden court decided to test his love and patience. Therefore, Adipatthar started to get just one fish for many consecutive days. Even then, the ardent devotee left them back to sea happily saying "Let this be to Thy who is our father and Mother". As a result, Adipatthar started becoming more and more poor. Days passed in the same way and one day his clan saw a miracle. They got a big golden fish filled with nine types of gems in their net. Adpatthar admired the fish and told "This wonderful fish shines like the Sun. It is the first one we got today and we are blessed to give it back to Shiva". He then left it back to the sea. Having felt his sincere love, the Lord who wears the crescent descended from the sky and blessed Adipatthar and his people saying "Let you and your people be with me forever". Adipatthar thus attained the glorious place near God Himself. The mention of the story is given by Sundarar and also recorded in Periyapuranam, the history of the 63 sacred Nayanmars by Sekkizhar.
