= Arisil =

Arisil River
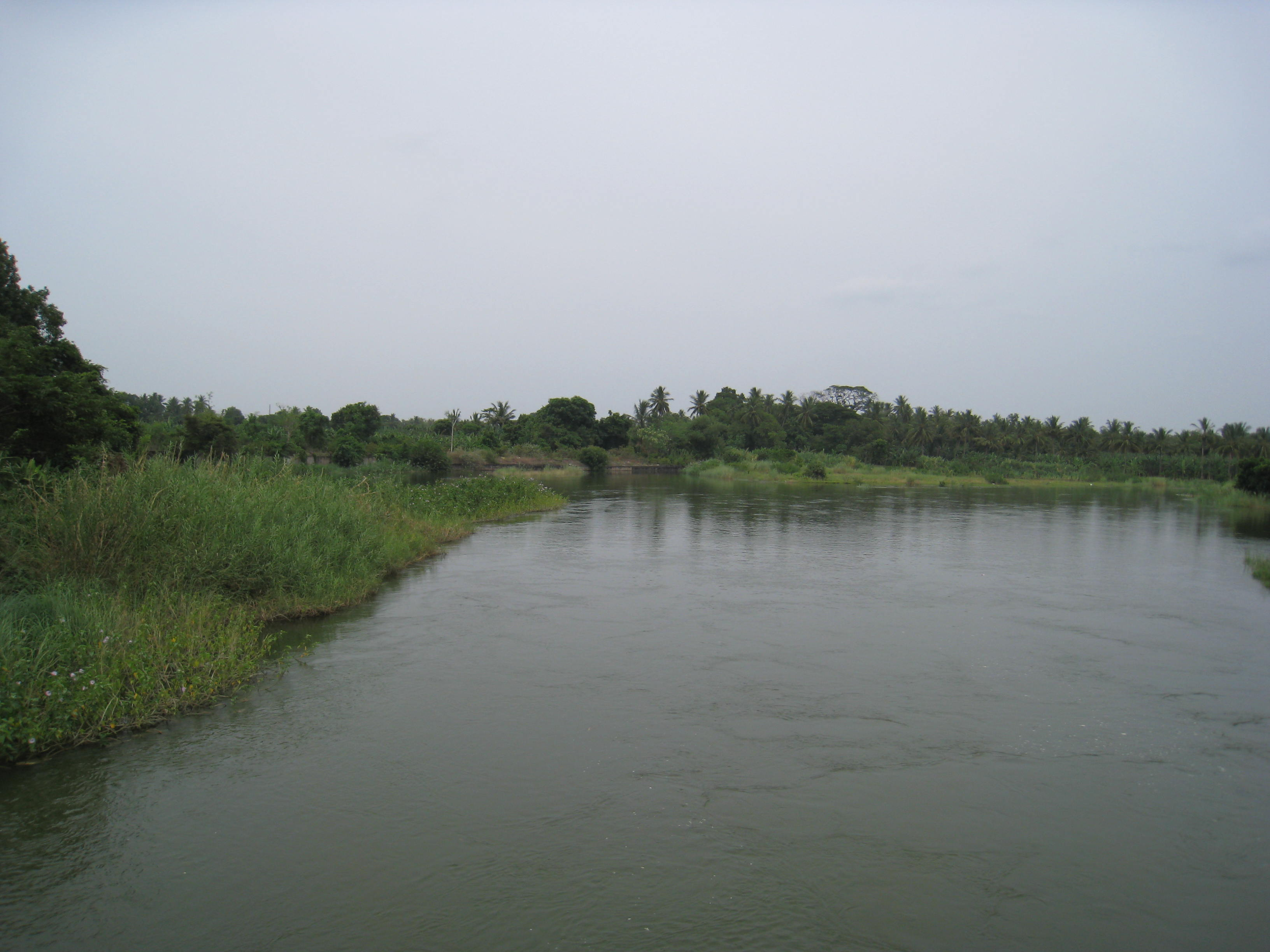
- Aricil River

Arisil or Aricil is a branch of the river Kaveri in the Tanjore district. It was the site of many a battle between the different Tamil kingdoms. One of the most notable being the 9th-century war between Nripatunga Pallava and Sri Mara Pandya in which the latter was defeated. Nripatunga was the son of Nandivarman III by a Rashtrakuta princess

The Arisil is also mentioned in the 10th chapter of the famous Tamil book Ponniyin Selvan.

== Gallery ==
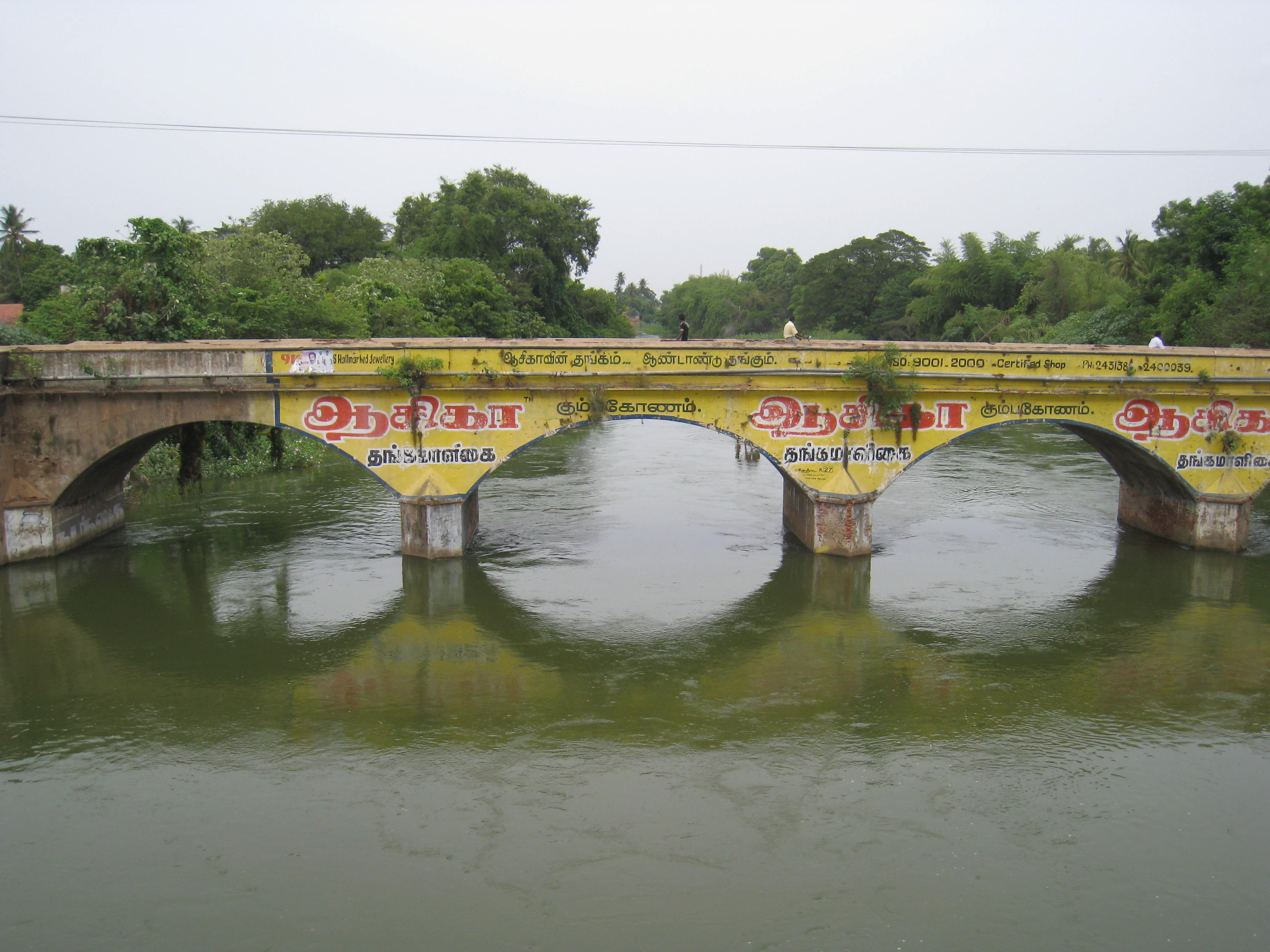
Bridge over Arisil river

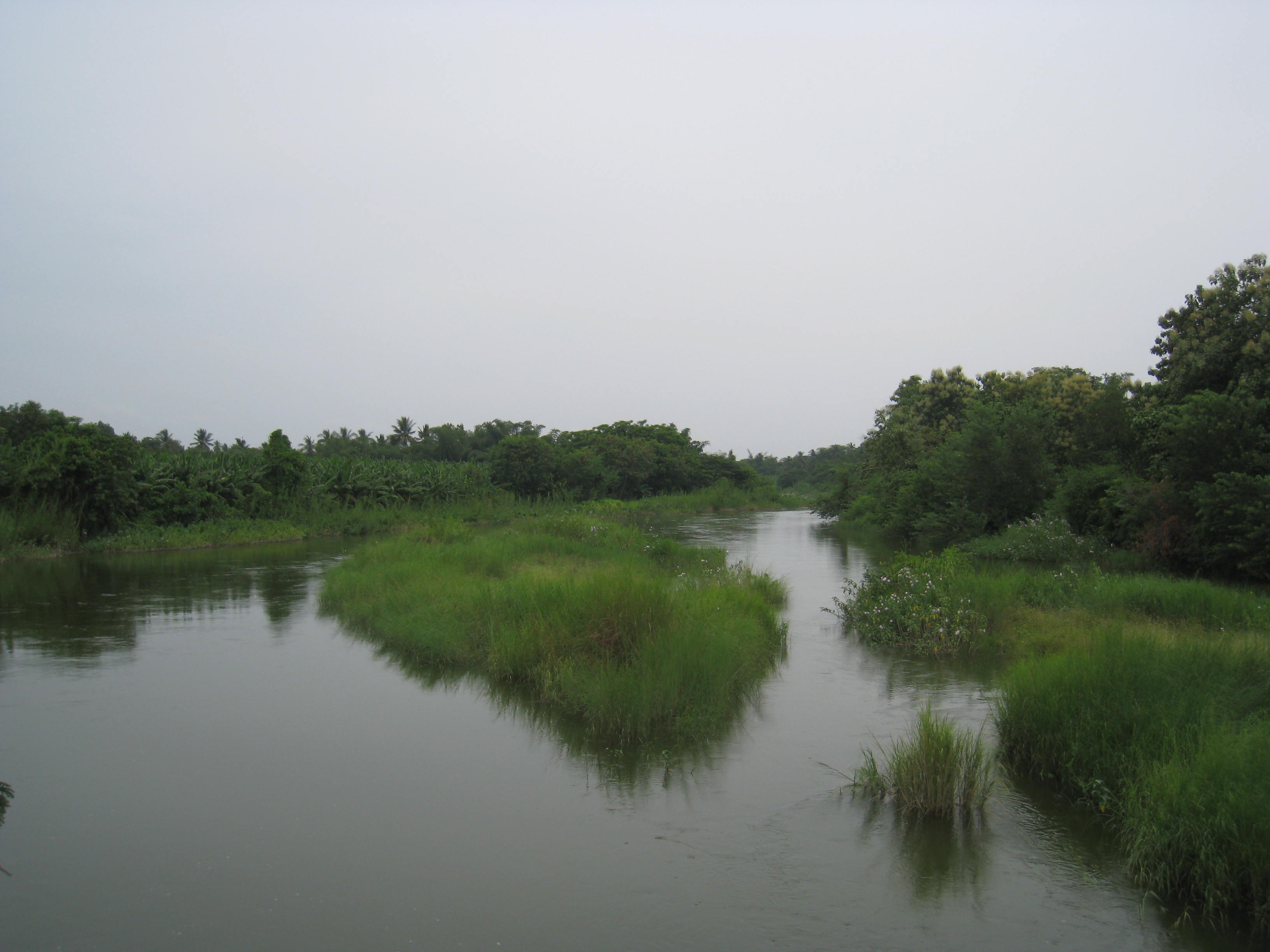
Aricil river, another view
