= Arivattaya Nayanar =

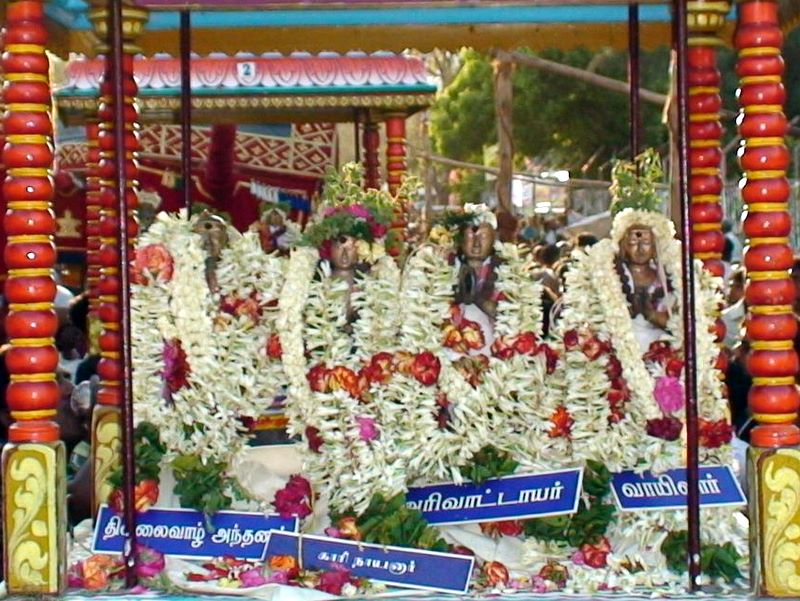
- thillaivazh andhanar ("thogai adiyar"), Kaari nayanar, Arivattaya nayanar, Vaayilaar

Personal life
- Born: Kannanthangudi
- Honors: Nayanar saint,

Religious life
- Religion: Hinduism
- Philosophy: Shaivism, Bhakti

Arivattaya Nayanar or Thayanar (Tamil: அரிவட்டாய நாயனார்) was the 12th Nayanar, a group of 63 Shaivite saints, venerated as great devotees of the Hindu god Shiva. Nayanars lived before or during the lifetime of Sundaramurthy Nayanar (8th Century).

== Primary source ==
In the Thiruthondar Thogai (8th century), a canonical work of Shaivism, Sundaramurthy Nayanar compiled the legendary lives of 62 Nayanars and he himself as the 63rd Nayanar. In the Periya Puranam, Sekkizhar (12th century) compiled the legendary lives of the 63 Nayanars.

== Birth and life ==
Arivattaya Nayanar was born as Thayanar on a Thiruvadhirai (Adra) star day in the Tamil month Thai in a wealthy Vellalar family in Kannanthangudi, a village located in Thanjavur district. Thayanar was a staunch devotee of Shiva and lived in Kannamangalam village with his wife.

Though Thayanar was the richest man in Kannamangalam, he led a righteous life. He was blessed with fertile farmland and adequate wealth. Thayanar and his chaste wife vowed to spend selfless service to Shiva. The couple made it routine to offer fine variety of cooked rice along with spinach to Shiva as Naivedya (food offering). Thayanar continued his humble and modest life with devotion by serving Shiva and his devotees.

== Test of devotion ==
Shiva wanted to test the devotion and faith of Thayanar and his wife. Thayanar lost his wealth gradually, but his devotion still remained intact.

Once a farm-owner, now Thayanar worked as a daily wage labourer in the fields. Yet he vowed to continue his devotional duties and offered Shiva cooked rice, made out of the grains he earned as wages. He was contended with the poor quality grains those remained for him and lived in poverty with his staunch faith in Shiva. Over a period of time the village was affected severely by drought and famine. Thayanar and his wife struggled to earn a livelihood and starved for days together. Thayanar's wife was never discouraged by the hardships. For the continuance of services to the Lord, the couple sold everything they had.

One day, the couple prepared and packed a basket full of cooked rice, green spinach, mango pickle, milk, curd, buttermilk, butter, ghee and the holy ashes. They proceeded towards Kannanthakudi Shiva temple to offer the food. The aged couple appeared thin and lost their energy due to incessant starvation. Hunger and poverty were taxing them. Thayanar, who carried the food basket lost his control and fell down on the ground. The food fell on the ground and was wasted. Thayanar was much moved and wept terribly. His carelessness was the reason for the loss of food meant for God and he wanted to punish himself for the sin. He took a dagger and thrust it on his neck.

Thayanar felt the presence of some force, preventing his attempt for suicide. When he opened his eyes, Shiva and his consort Parvati appeared before the couple by sitting on their celestial bull vehicle. Shiva appreciated the couple's selfless devotion and faith and declared that they passed their trial of faith. Shiva blessed the couple with Salvation.

Since saint Arivattaya Nayanar was born in the star Thiruvadhirai (Ārdrā) of Tamil month Thai, the saint is being worshipped in Shiva temples on this specific day and is celebrated as Arivattaya Nayanar's day.
