= Seruthunai Nayanar =

Personal life
- Born: c. 8-9th century CE Thanjavur
- Honors: Nayanar saint,

Religious life
- Religion: Hinduism
- Philosophy: Shaivism, Bhakti

Seruthunai Nayanar, also known as Seruthunai (also spelt as Ceruttunai, Cheruthunai and Seruttunai), Seruthunaiyar and Seruttunai Nayanar, was a Nayanar saint, venerated in the Hindu sect of Shaivism. He is generally counted as the 55th in the list of 63 Nayanars.

== Life ==
The life of Seruthunai Nayanar is described in the Periya Puranam by Sekkizhar (12th century), which is a hagiography of the 63 Nayanars. The Periya Puranam narrates his tale twice, once in the chapter dedicated to him and again in the tale of the Pallava king Kazharsinga, who is also considered as a Nayanar saint. Kazharsinga is dated between 8-9th century depending on identification with historical Pallava kings.

Seruthunai Nayanar was born in Thanjavur, Marukal Nadu which was then part of the Pallava kingdom ruled by Kazharsinga. Thanjavur is now in the Indian state of Tamil Nadu. Seruthunai was a Vellalar, a caste of agricultural land owners. He was a devout devotee of Shiva, the patron god of Shaivism. He journeyed to Thiruvarur and worshipped at the shrine of Araneri, dedicated to Shiva. This temple is identified as the Sri Achaleswarar (Vandarkuzhali) temple, which is located in the Thyagaraja Temple complex. He volunteered to perform various services in the temple.

Once, the reigning king Kazharsinga and his queen consort arrived to pay respects to Shiva. She arrived in the temple hall (mandapa) where various flowers were gathered to use as floral offerings to Shiva as well as create garlands for him. A flower had fallen from the dais where the garlands were made. The queen picked the flower and smelt it. In Hinduism, it is taboo to use or smell flowers meant for God, before they are offered to him. Seruthunai Nayanar was enraged by the conduct of the Pallava queen. Ignoring her royal status, he dragged her by her hair and pushed her on the ground. He caught her nose and punished her by severing it. For fearless actions, he is said to have attained the abode of Shiva after death. The chapter of Kazharsinga gives further details about the event. The queen screamed in pain. The infuriated Kazharsinga rushed to her and asked who had dared to assault his queen and challenge his authority. Seruthunai Nayanar took responsibility and explained the rationale of his actions. Kazharsinga deemed the punishment inadequate and chopped off the hand of the queen, by which she had lifted the flower.

== Remembrance ==
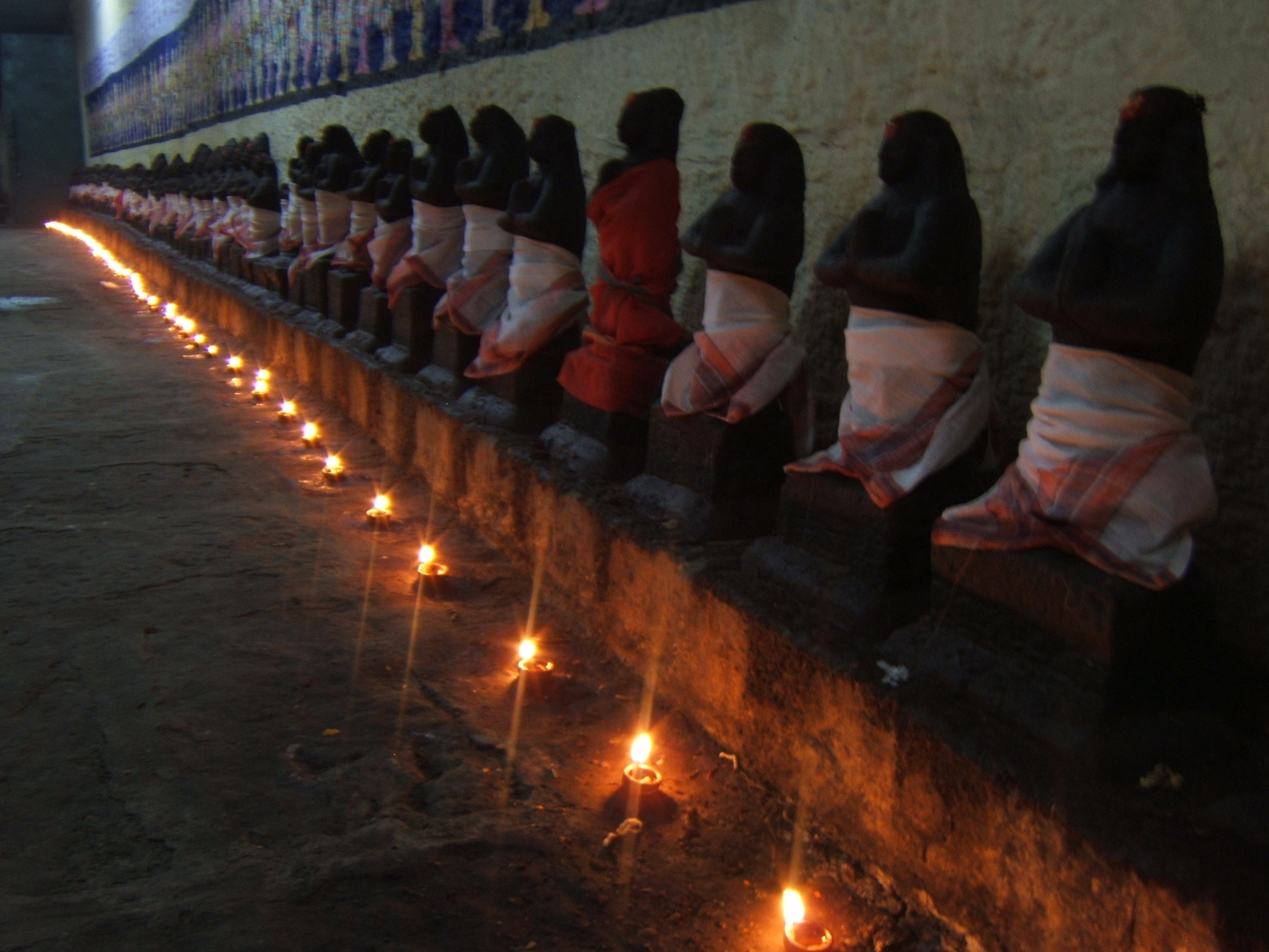
The images of the Nayanars are found in many Shiva temples in Tamil Nadu.

One of the most prominent Nayanars, Sundarar (8th century) venerates Seruthunai Nayanar in the Tiruthonda Thogai, a hymn to Nayanar saints and praising him as king of Thanjavur.

Seruthunai Nayanar is worshipped in the Tamil month of Avani, when the moon enters the Pushya nakshatra (lunar mansion). He is depicted with folded hands (see Anjali mudra). He receives collective worship as part of the 63 Nayanars. Their icons and brief accounts of his deeds are found in many Shiva temples in Tamil Nadu. Their images are taken out in procession in festivals.
