= Aiyadigal Kadavarkon Nayanar =

Personal life
- Born: Kanchipuram
- Honors: Nayanar saint

Religious life
- Religion: Hinduism - Vanniyar
- Philosophy: Shaivism, Bhakti

Aiyadigal Kadavarkon was a ruler of the Kadava dynasty and was ruling from Kanchipuram. Later he became the 46th Nayanar Saint in Tamil Nadu.

== Explanation of Name ==
According to Sujit Mukherjee the saint king appears to have been a Pallava King, Simma Varman (c. 550–575). The Encyclopedia of Saivism identifies the term Kadavar with Pallava dynasty and the Tamil term kon as king.

== Efficient Ruler ==
Kanchipuram, the capital of Pallavas is known as the city of active power and was ruled by the king Aiyadigal Kadavarkon. The king was fluent in Tamil and Sanskrit languages and his knowledge of Tamil and Sanskrit has been the source of Tamil hymns on Shiva.

== Pilgrimage ==
The king found that ruling the country was a hindrance to his progress towards Shiva and to his Saivite duties and services. He crowned his son and made him to continue as an administrator in according to his principles. Thereafter he renounced the world and left for continuous pilgrimage to Shiva temples. Wherever he goes, he used to compose Tamil hymns on Shiva. After worshiping many Shiva temples, he reached Thillai Nataraja Temple, Chidambaram. He stayed there and was melted with the cosmic dance of Nataraja. Finally the saint merged with Shiva in the dancing court.

== Tamil Hymn Composer ==
The Tamil hymns composed by the saint during his pilgrimage were collected and was named as Kshetra Tiruvenba. The collection has about twenty four hymns.
