= Idangazhi =

Idangazhi (Idangali), also known as Idangazhi Nayanar (Idankali Nayanar), Idangaliyar (Idankaliyar) was a Nayanar saint, venerated in the Hindu sect of Shaivism. He is generally counted as the fifty-fourth in the list of 63 Nayanars. He was an Irukku Velir chieftain, who is described to not only have pardoned a devotee of the god Shiva, who stole from the royal granaries, but also distributed rice to devotees of Shiva.

== Life ==
Idangazhi was born and lived in Kodumbalur (Kodumpalur), currently in the Indian state of Tamil Nadu. Idangazhi was one of the Irukku Velir, petty chieftains who served under the Chola kings. He is said to have been descended from the Yadavas of Dwarka, who migrated to South India with the sage Agastya. He is sometimes also described to be part of the Kalabhra dynasty, who flourished in the Kalabhra interregnum, a period between 3rd and the 7th century.

The life of Idangazhi is described in the Periya Puranam by Sekkizhar (12th century), which is a hagiography of the 63 Nayanars. Idangazhi was the chieftain of the kingdom of Konadu (which was around present-day Pudukkottai district), whose capital was Kodumbalur. He was a staunch devotee of the god Shiva, the patron god of Shaivism. He lived and governed by Shaiva ways and made arrangements for worship of Shiva in temples as per the Shaiva Agama scriptures. There was another devotee of Shiva in Konadu. He had taken the vow of serving and feeding Shiva's devotees. However, once he became poor over time and could not get food to feed a devotee of Shiva. To complete his vow, he entered the royal granaries to steal rice, but was caught red-handed and arrested by the guards. The arrested devotee was presented to Idangazhi, who understood the rationale of the intended burglary. He pardoned the devotee and let him free. He realized the futility of a full go-down when devotees of Shiva were going hungry. Idangazhi made announcements throughout the kingdom that devotees of Shiva can come and take away not only rice from the granary, but also other riches from the treasury, as much as they wanted. Idangazhi was instrumental in the spread of Shaivism and thus gained the grace of Shiva.

In the Periya Puranam, Idangazhi is described as the ancestor of the Chola King Aditya I (c. 871 – c. 907 CE).

== Remembrance ==
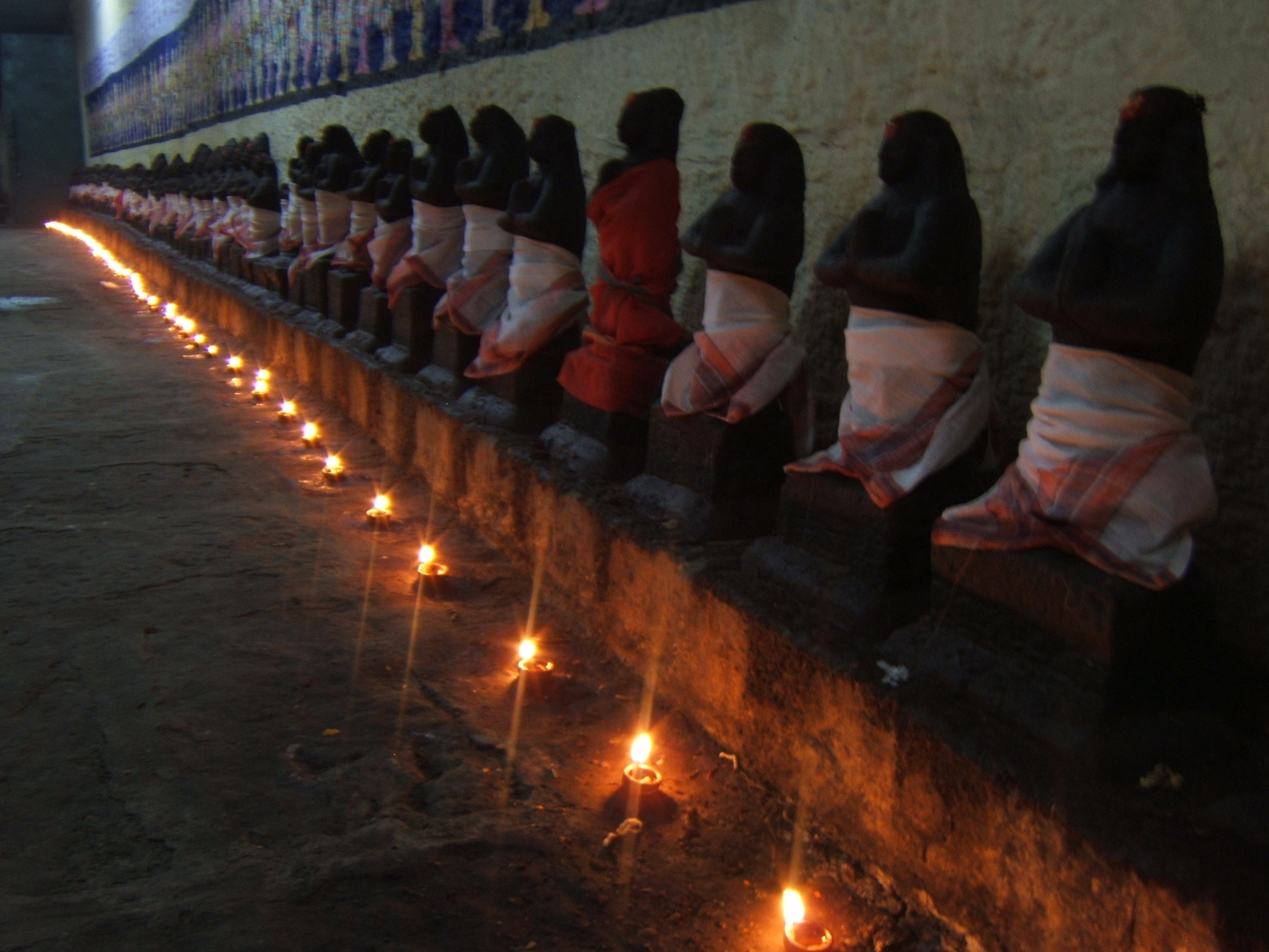
The images of the Nayanars are found in many Shiva temples in Tamil Nadu.

Idangazhi Nayanar is specially worshipped in the Tamil month of Aippasi, when the moon enters the Krittikā nakshatra (lunar mansion). He receives collective worship as part of the 63 Nayanars. Their icons and brief accounts of his deeds are found in many Shiva temples in Tamil Nadu. Their images are taken out in procession in festivals.
