= Kutruva Nayanar =

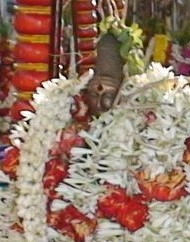

Personal life
- Born: Kalandai
- Honors: Nayanar saint,

Religious life
- Religion: Hinduism
- Philosophy: Jainism, Shaivism, Bhakti

Kutruva Nayanar, also known as Kootruva , Kutruva, Kutruvar, Kootruvar, Kurruva Nayanar, Kurruvar, Kurruvan, Kutruvanar, Kurrrruvar and Kalappalar, was a chieftain of Kalandai and a Nayanar saint, venerated in the Hindu sect of Shaivism. He is generally counted as the 39th in the list of 63 Nayanars. Kutruva is often described as a Jain, who became a devotee of Shiva, the patron god of Shaivism.

== Life ==
The life of Kutruva Nayanar is described in the Tamil Periya Puranam by Sekkizhar (12th century), which is a hagiography of the 63 Nayanars. His name "Kutruva" means the "God of death" in Tamil.

The Periya Puranam narrates that Kutruva was the chieftain of Kalandai (Kalantai). He was from the Kalabhras community. He is described a devotee of Shiva. He defeated many kings and chieftains in war and acquired their wealth and territories in Pandya and Chola kingdoms. Kutruva had acquired extensive lands and wealth through his campaigns, but lacking a formal title was still technically a chieftain, with no legal basis to rule his de facto domain. He requested the priests (Brahmins) of Chidambaram temple of Thillai. The Brahmins who owed allegiance to the Chola kings and crowned the Cholas, refused and fled to Malai Nadu (modern-day Kerala) under the protection of the Chera king. Kutruva approached Nataraja, the presiding form of Shiva of Chidambaram temple, to crown him with keeping his foot over Kutruva's head. Nataraja appeared in Kutruva's dream and complied, giving him the divine authority to rule. He continued to worship Shiva and gave patronage to the god's temple. He ultimately reached Kailash, Shiva's abode after death.

While the Periya Puranam does not explicitly describe as a Jain, Kutruva Nayanar is often described as a Jain. The refusal of the Hindu priests of Chidambaram to crown a Jain monarch is explained. According to some theories, he was a Kalabhra chieftain, who were chiefly Jains. His title, Kalappalar (king of Kalappal) is used to identify him as member of the Kalappalar clan, who are in turn identified with Kalabharas. His home-town Kalandai identified with modern-day Kalappal, Thiruvarur district of the Indian state of Tamil Nadu. Other theories identify Kalandai as Kalattur, in the ancient region of Tondai Nadu. Another suggestion identifies it as Peria Kalandai, Coimbatore district where the Adityesvara Shiva temple built by the Chola king Aditya I (c. 871 – c. 907 CE) stands.

== Remembrance ==
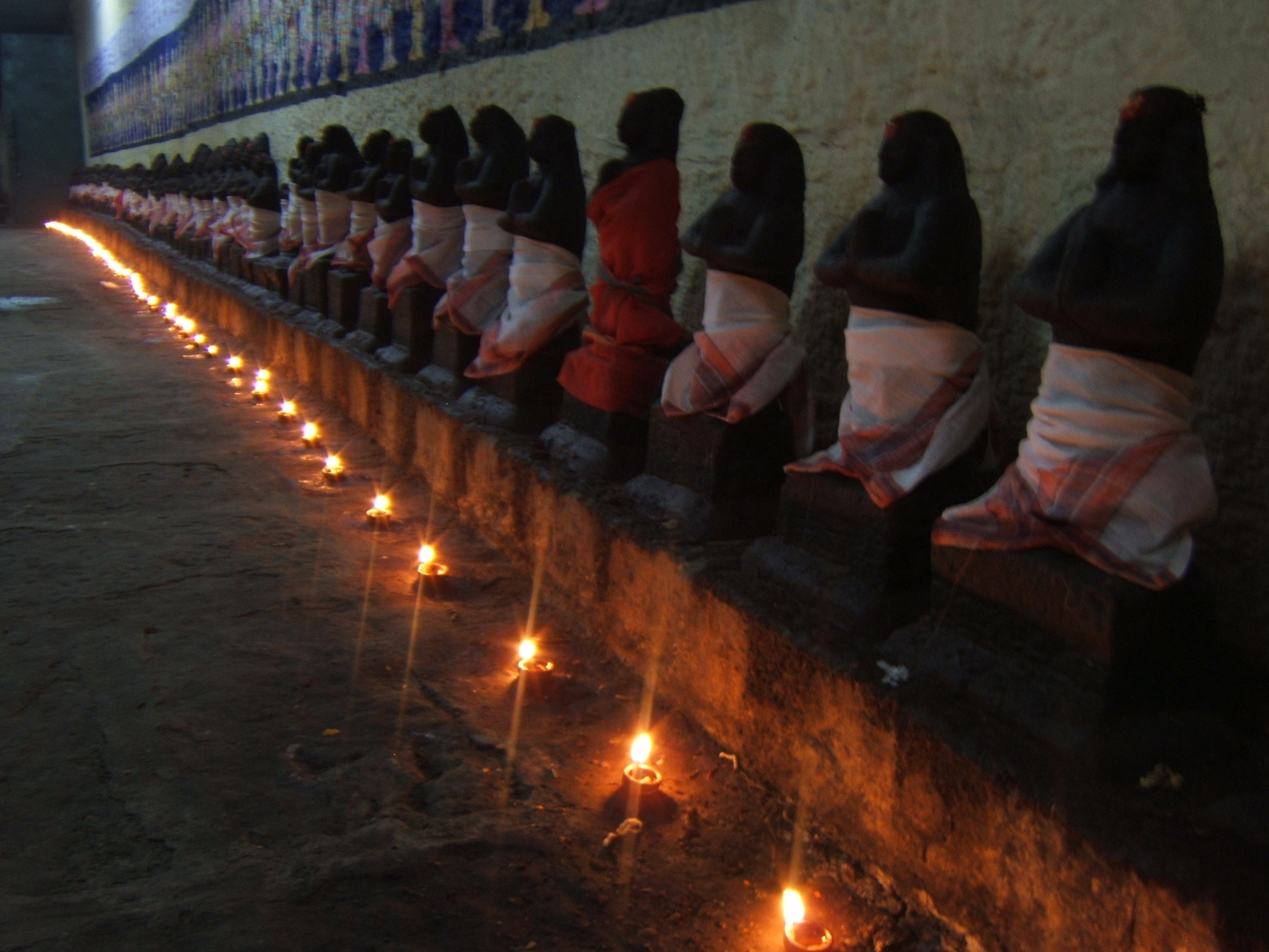
The images of the Nayanars are found in many Shiva temples in Tamil Nadu.

One of the most prominent Nayanars, Sundarar (8th century) venerates Kutruva Nayanar (called Kurran in the hymn) in the Tiruthonda Thogai, a hymn to Nayanar saints. He is described as the prince of Kalandai, who wields a spear.

Kutruva Nayanar is worshipped on the Poornima (full moon day) of the Tamil month of Adi. He is depicted as a king with a crown, folded hands (see Anjali mudra) and sometimes a sword in the crook of his arm. He receives collective worship as part of the 63 Nayanars. Their icons and brief accounts of his deeds are found in many Shiva temples in Tamil Nadu. Their images are taken out in procession in festivals.
