= Pugazh Thunai Nayanar =

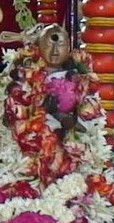

Personal life
- Born: Alagaputhur
- Honors: Nayanar saint

Religious life
- Religion: Hinduism
- Philosophy: Shaivism, Bhakti

Pugazh Thunai Nayanar, also known as Pugazhthunai Nayanar, Pugalthunai Nayanar, Pukazhtthunai Nayanar, Pukazhtthunaiyar and Pukalttunai, was a Nayanar saint, venerated in the Hindu sect of Shaivism. He is generally counted as the fifty-sixth in the list of 63 Nayanars.

== Life ==
The life of Pugazh Thunai Nayanar is described in the Periya Puranam by Sekkizhar (12th century), which is a hagiography of the 63 Nayanars.

Pugazh Thunai Nayanar was born in Seruviliputhur (Ceriviliputthur), presently known as Alagaputhur and located in the Thanjavur district of the Indian state of Tamil Nadu. He belonged to Adi Shaiva sub-sect of Shaivism and belonged to the Brahmin (priest) caste. The Nayanar was a staunch devotee of Shiva, the patron god of Shaivism. He worked as the pujari (temple priest) at the Shiva temple. The temple is identified as Padikasu Nathar Temple of Alagaputhur. As per his daily priestly duties, he used to bathe (see Abhisheka) the Lingam (aniconic image of Shiva and central icon in the temple) with cool and fragrant water.

Once, a famine struck the region and however continued to fetch water and worship the god. His body became emaciated. Finally, he succumbed to the pangs of hunger and fainted; the pot of water fell on the lingam and broke. Shiva appeared in Pugazh Thunai Nayanar's dream and said that he would leave a gold coin daily as a "daily wage" so that the Nayanar can sustain himself till the end of the famine. Pugazh Thunai Nayanar found a gold coin daily at the foot of Lingam. He continued his services even after the famine till end of his life, when he attained Kailash, the abode of Shiva after death.

== Remembrance ==
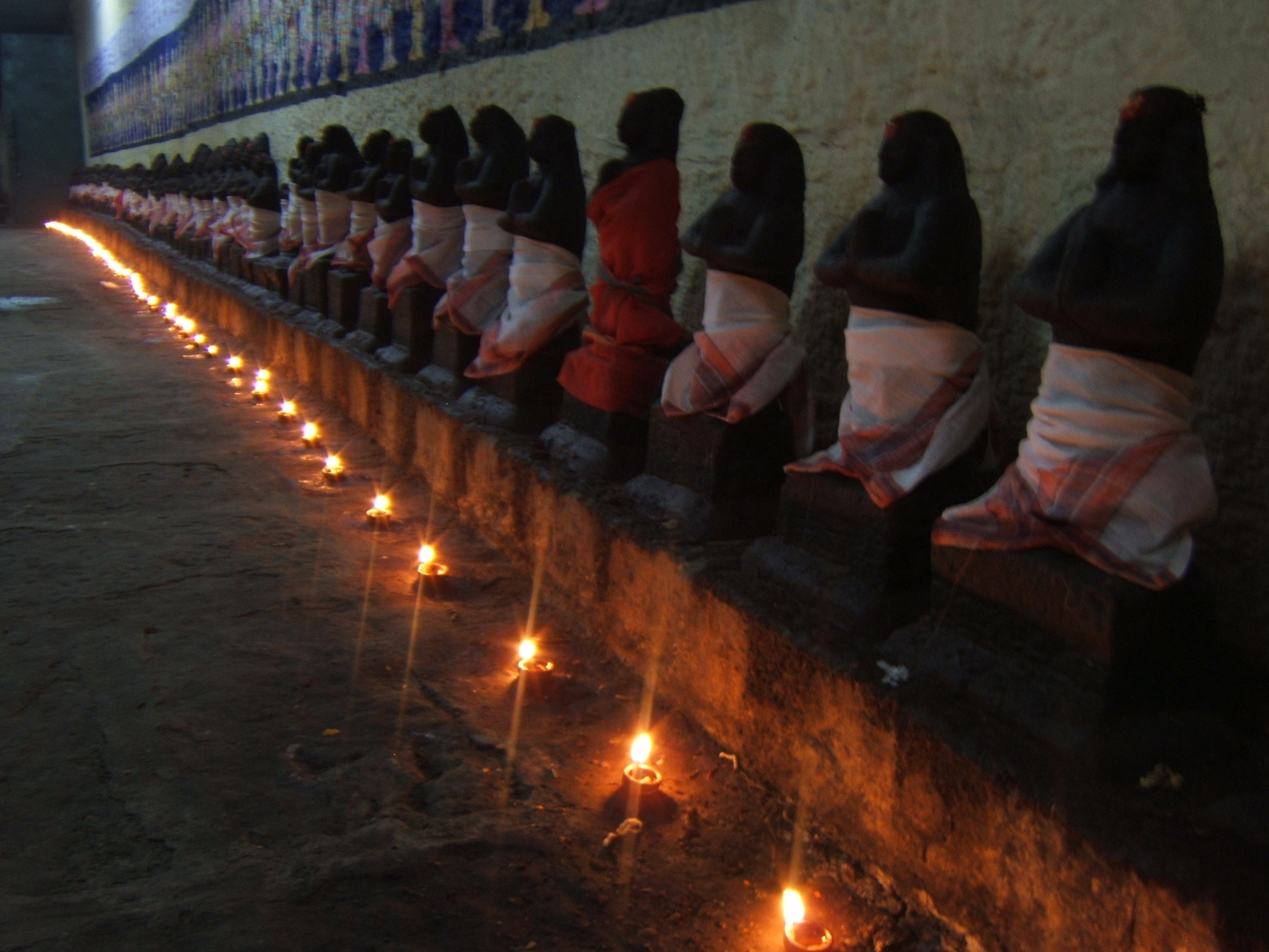
The images of the Nayanars are found in many Shiva temples in Tamil Nadu.

One of the most prominent Nayanars, Sundarar (8th century) venerates Pugazh Thunai Nayanar in the Tiruthonda Thogai, a hymn to Nayanar saints. He is described to devoted his life to the feet of Shiva, who dances as snakes and his tiger skin around his waist sway. Sundarar also recalls the legend of Pugazh Thunai Nayanar in a hymn in honour of the Padikasu Nathar Temple (Arisirkaraiputtur).

Pugazh Thunai Nayanar is also worshipped with his wife Lakshmi in the front mandapa of the Padikasu Nathar Temple. His descendants continue to serve as the temple priests. In honour of Pugazh Thunai Nayanar's tale, devotees place two coins at the foot of the lingam and take home one of the coins.

Pugazh Thunai Nayanar is worshipped in the Tamil month of Avani, when the moon enters the Ashlesha nakshatra (lunar mansion). He is depicted with folded hands (see Anjali mudra) and sometimes holding a pot of water. He receives collective worship as part of the 63 Nayanars. Their icons and brief accounts of his deeds are found in many Shiva temples in Tamil Nadu. Their images are taken out in procession in festivals.
