= Kotpuli =

Nayanar saint, venerated in Shaivism

Personal life
- Born: Kotpuli Pillai; 8th century CE Nattiyattankuti
- Honors: Nayanar saint

Religious life
- Religion: Hinduism
- Philosophy: Shaivism, Bhakti

Kotpuli, also known as Kotpuliyar and Kotpuli Nayanar, was a Nayanar saint, venerated in the Hindu sect of Shaivism. He is generally counted as the fifty-seventh in the list of 63 Nayanars.

== Life ==
The life of Kotpuli Nayanar is described in the Periya Puranam by Sekkizhar (12th century), which is a hagiography of the 63 Nayanars. He is described as a contemporary of one of the most prominent Nayanars, Sundarar (8th century). His name "Kotpuli" means "Ferocious tiger".

Kotpuli Nayanar was born in Nattiyattankuti, in the Chola kingdom (Chola Nadu). His home-town is currently known as Tirunattiyattangudi (Nattiyattankudi), Thanjavur district in the Indian state of Tamil Nadu. He was born in a Chozhia Vellalar family, a caste of agricultural land owners. He was a great devotee of Shiva, the patron god of Shaivism. He was the commander-in-chief of the Chola army. Over the years, he had become wealthy and used his wealth to donate "hills" of rice in Shiva temples, which were used to prepare Naivedya (food offerings) to Shiva. He pursued his services for many years. Once when he was called on military duty, he stored piles of rice in his house, which he instructed should be used for the Naivedya, while he was away. He conveyed his orders to all his kinsmen individually.

A famine struck Nattiyattankuti. Kotpuli's family consumed the rice to save themselves. Kotpuli won the war and returned with many gifts from the Chola king. He learnt of the actions of his relatives and decided to punish them. He invited all his kin to his house for a celebration of his victory. Kotpuli ordered the doors of his mansions be closed so his relatives can not escape and made a servant stand guard. Kotpuli killed his parents, brothers and wives for their transgression. The servant requested the master to spare the life of an infant, who had not eaten the rice and was the last heir of Kotpuli's family. Kotpuli killed the infant too, reasoning he had drunk the breast milk of a woman, who had consumed the rice. The true reason for their murders was that in their past lives his relatives had conspired and killed the head of their family in order to inherit the latter's vast wealth, and thus their karma dictated they be killed in a similar way. Although, upon witnessing this, Parvati ascended to Earth and brought each of them back to life by healing their wounds as they had been fervent Shaiva devotees of her and Shiva. Pleased by his intense devotion, Shiva appeared before Kotpuli and blessed him. He informed Kotpuli that he along with his formerly-massacred relatives would be allowed to attain Shivatvam (having soul merged with and being one with Shiva), and in turn moksha (liberation), and took Kotpuli to his abode Kailash. The message of the tale is that the devotion to God should supersede everything else.

Kotpuli is said to given two of daughters Cinkati and Vannapakai to Sundarar, who reared them as their foster father.

== Remembrance ==
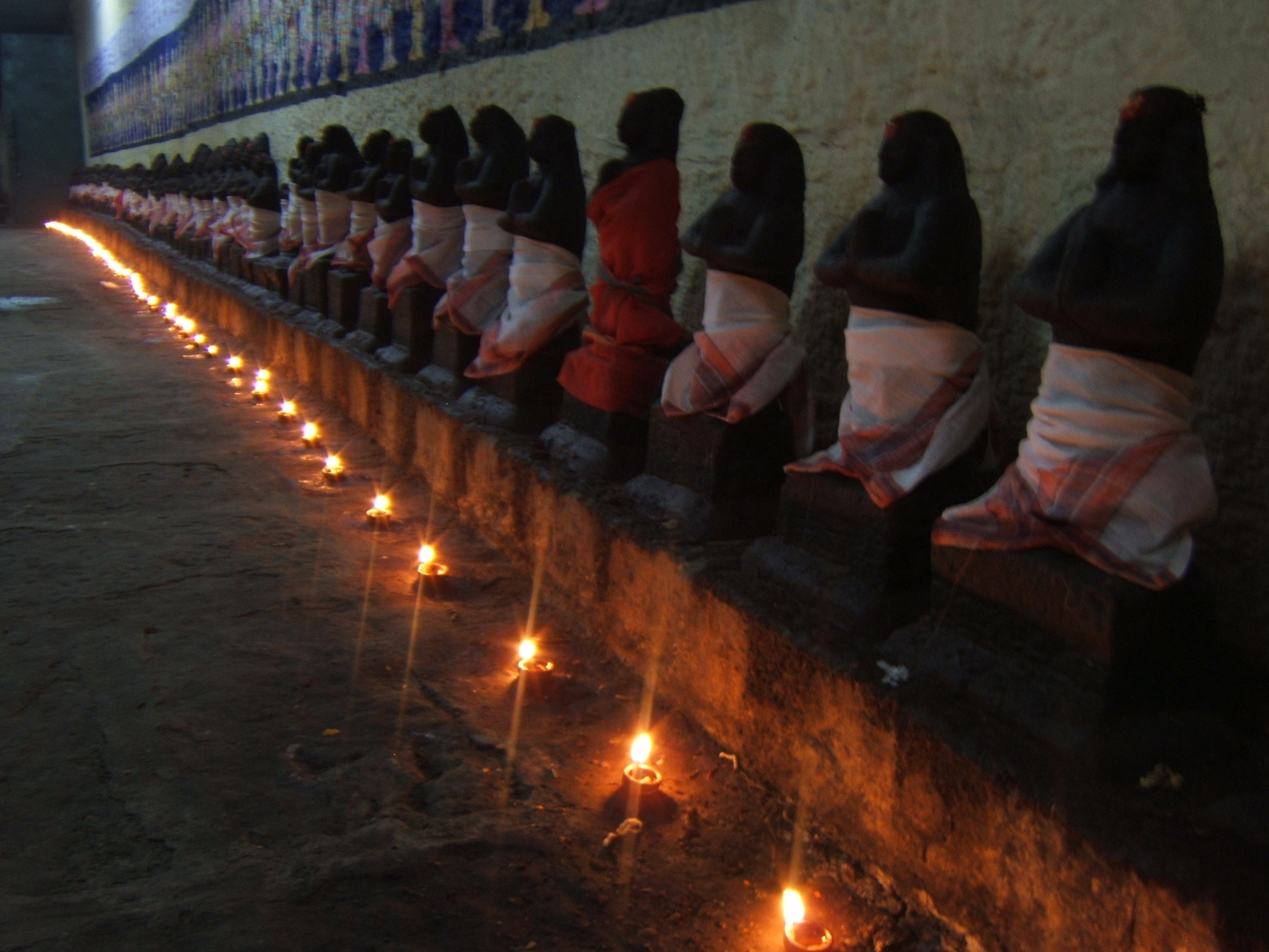
The images of the Nayanars are found in many Shiva temples in Tamil Nadu.

Sundarar venerates Kotpuli Nayanar in the Tiruthonda Thogai, a hymn to Nayanar saints. He is described as "lordly" and carrying a spear.

Kotpuli is especially associated with the Shiva temple in Nattiyattankudi and is also worshipped in the temple. In his hymn to Shiva worshipped at Nattiyattankudi, Sundarar dedicates the last verse to Kotpuli. Kotpuli - the father of Cinkati - is described to serve the temple. He is described as kotiran, "one who is like pincers or jaws" and defeated enemy kings in war.

Kotpuli is worshipped in the Tamil month of Aadi, when the moon enters the Jyeshtha nakshatra (lunar mansion). He is depicted wearing a crown, with folded hands (see Anjali mudra) and holding a sword in the crook of his arm. He receives collective worship as part of the 63 Nayanars. Their icons and brief accounts of his deeds are found in many Shiva temples in Tamil Nadu. Their images are taken out in procession in festivals.
