= Nayanars =

Group of Shaiva saints

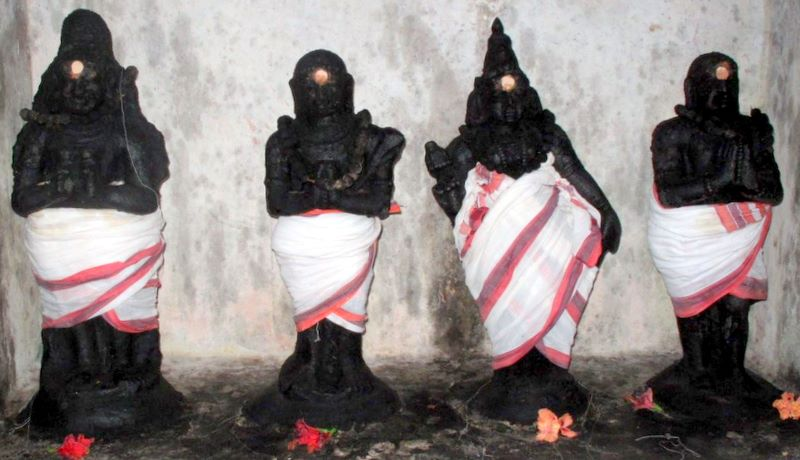
The Nalvar (lit. 'The Four') of Shaiva Siddhanta – (from left) Sambandar, Appar and Sundarar, the three foremost Nayanars, and Manikkavacakar.

The Nayanars (or Nayanmars; Tamil: நாயன்மார், romanized: Nāyaṉmār, lit. 'hounds') were a group of 63 Tamil saints living during the 6th to 8th centuries CE. Along with the Alvars, their contemporaries, they influenced the Bhakti movement in early medieval South India. The names of the Nayanars were first compiled by Sundarar. The list was expanded by Nambiyandar Nambi during his compilation of material by the poets for the Tirumurai collection, and would include Sundarar himself and Sundarar's parents.

The Nalvar (lit. 'The Four') are the three foremost Nayanars Appar, Sundarar, Sambandar along with Manikkavacakar.

== History ==
The dating of Appar and Sambandar has been associated with evidence from Pallava and Pandya inscriptions. Mahendravarman I, the son of Simhavishnu, ruled during the early seventh century and is identified in inscriptions with the name Gunabhara. According to the Periya Puranam, Appar converted Mahendravarman I to Shaivism. The list of the Nayanars was initially compiled by Sundarar (Sundararmurthi). In his poem Tiruthonda Thogai he sings, in eleven verses, the names of the Nayanar saints up to Karaikkal Ammaiyar, and refers to himself as "the servant of servants". The list did not go into the detail of the lives of the saints, which were described in detail in works such as Tevaram.

In the 10th century, king Raja Raja Chola I collected the volumes of Tevaram after hearing excerpts of the hymns in his court. His priest Nambiyandar Nambi began compiling the hymns into a series of volumes called the Tirumurai. He arranged the hymns of three saint poets Sambandar, Appar and Sundarar as the first seven books which he called the Tevaram. He compiled Manikkavasakar's Tirukovayar and Tiruvasakam as the eighth book, the 28 hymns of nine other saints as the ninth book, the Tirumandiram of Tirumular and 40 hymns by 12 other poets as the tenth book. In the eleventh book, he created the Tirutontanar Tiruvanthathi (also known as Tirutoṇṭar Antādi, lit. Necklace of Verses on the Lord's Servants), which consisted of 89 verses, with a verse devoted to each of the saints. With the addition of Sundarar and his parents to the sequence, this became the canonical list of the 63 saints. In the 12th century, Sekkizhar added a twelfth volume to the Tirumurai called Periya Puranam in which he expands further on the stories of each of 63 Nayanars.

The Nayanars were from various backgrounds, including Nadar, Vanniyar, Vellalars, Idayars, Kurumbars, Thevars, oilmongers, Brahmins, Vannar, and Paraiyars. Along with the twelve Vaishnava Alvars, they are regarded as the important Hindu saints from South India.

Many Kannada works, such has Nambiyannana Ragale and Tiru Nilakanta Devara Ragale, are written on Nayanars by Kannada poet Harihara. Sundara Murthy nayanar is known as Nambiyanna in Kannada literature.

== List of Nayanars ==
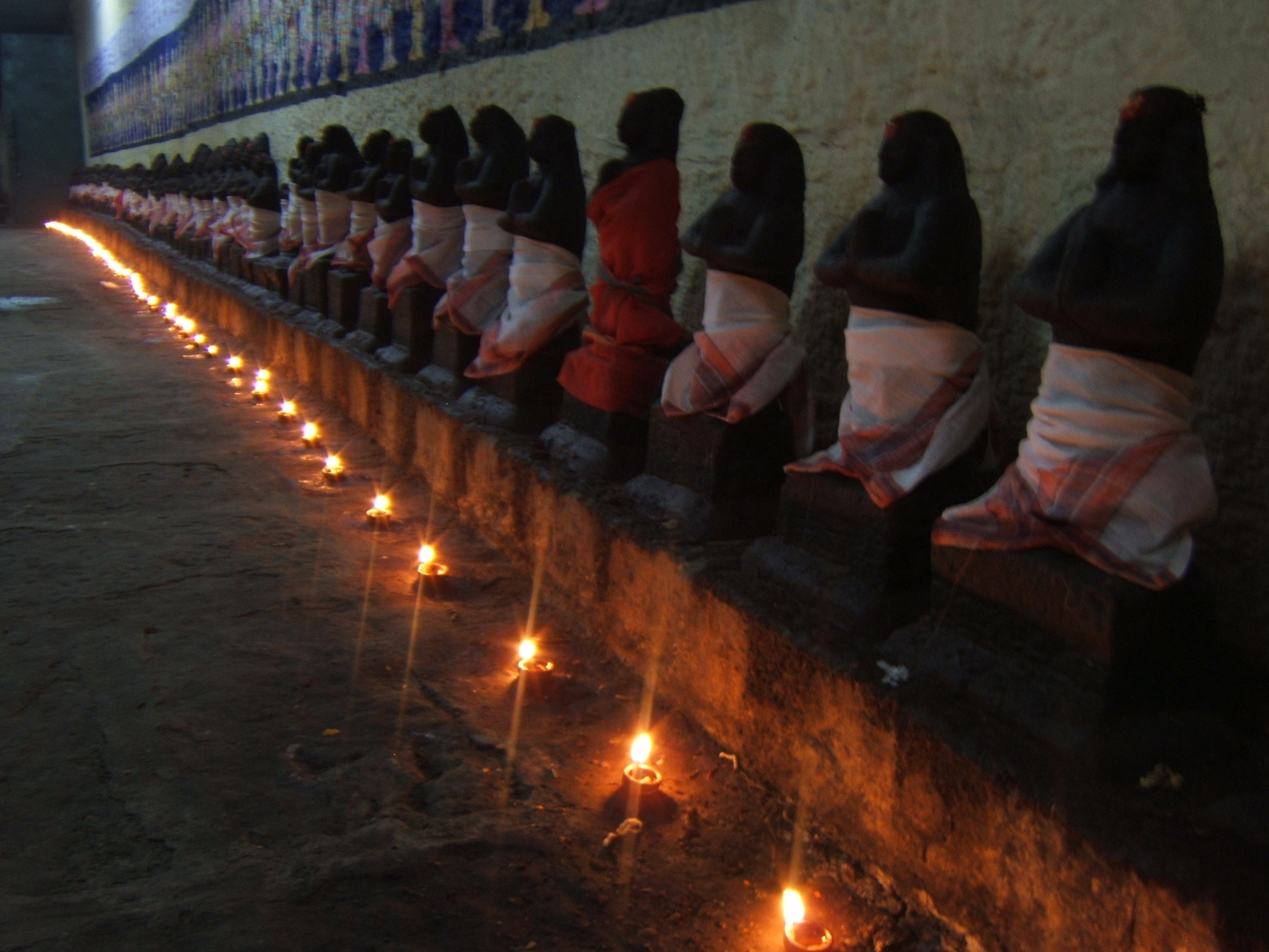
The 63 Nayanars in a Shiva temple

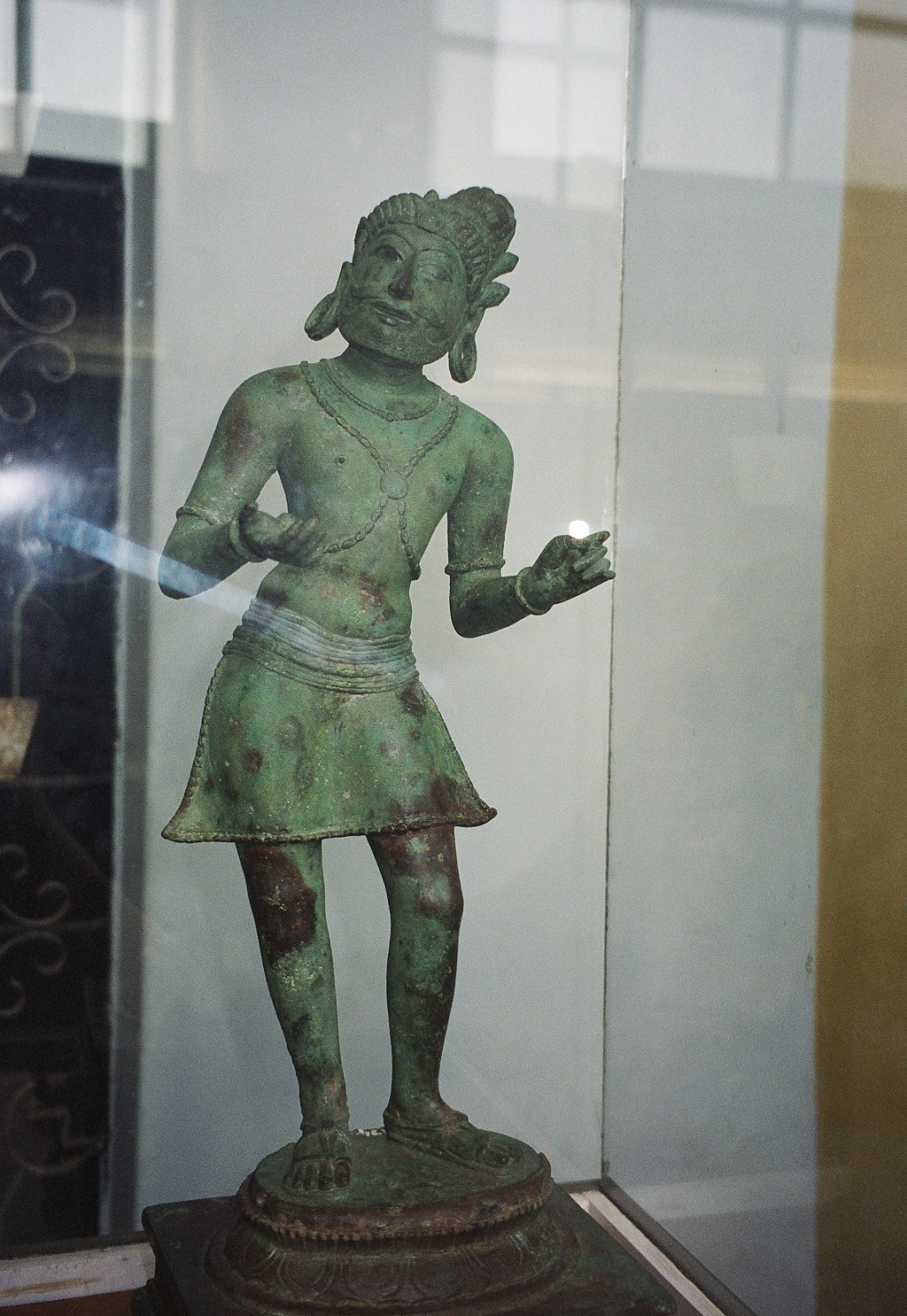
(Kannappa Nayanar)

Sundarar's original list of Nayanars did not follow any sequence with regard to chronology or importance. However, some groups have since followed an order for arranging their Nayanar temple images according to Sundarar's poem as well as the information from Nambi and Sekkizhar.

List of 63 Nayanars
No.	Person	Notes
1	Sundarar	Born in Aadi month, Swathi nakshathiram in 8th Century AD
2	Tiru Neelakanta	
3	Iyarpagaiar	His name "Iyarpagai" means "Contrary to Nature"
4	Ilayankudi Maranar	
5	Meiporul	
6	Viralminda	
7	Amaraneedi	
8	Eripatha	
9	Yenathinathar	A Brave swordsman/general in Chola Military
10	Kannappa	Believed to be a reincarnation of Arjuna
11	Kungiliya Kalaya	
12	Manakanchara	
13	Arivattaya	
14	Anaya	
15	Murthiyar	
16	Muruga	
17	Rudra Pasupathi	
18	Nandanar (Thirunalai Povar)	
19	Tiru Kurippu Thonda	
20	Chandeshvara	
21	Appar (Tirunavukkarasar)	His efforts convinced the Pallava king, Mahendra- Varman I to take up Shaivism.
22	Kulachirai	He became the Prime Minister of the Pandyan King Koon Pandiyan.
23	Perumizhalai Kurumba	
24	Karaikkal Ammaiyar	Nagarathar Woman saint who lived in the 6th century; one of the three female Nayanars
25	Apputhi Adigal	
26	Tiruneelanakka	
27	Nami Nandi Adigal	
28	Sambandar	A child prodigy Saiva Saint who lived only 16 years
29	Eyarkon Kalikama	
30	Tirumular	
31	Dandi Adigal	
32	Murkha	
33	Somasi Mara	
34	Sakkiya	
35	Sirappuli	
36	Siruthondar	Army general of the Pallava king Narasimavarman I
37	Cheraman Perumal	Tentatively identified with Chera ruler Rama Rajasekhara Born in Aadhi month, Swathi nakshathiram
38	Gananatha	
39	Kootruva	
40	Pugal Chola	Chola King
41	Narasinga Muniyaraiyar	
42	Adipaththar	
43	Kalikamba	
44	Kalia	Born in Aadhi month, Kettai nakshathiram
45	Satti	
46	Aiyadigal Kadavarkon	
47	Kanampulla	
48	Kari	
49	Ninra Seer Nedumaara	Pandya King
50	Mangayarkkarasiyar	Queen and consort of Nindra Seer Nedumaran; one of the three female Nayanars
51	Vayilar	
52	Munaiyaduvar	
53	Kazharsinga	Tentatively identified with Pallava king Narasimhavarman II (Rajasimha)
54	Idangazhi	
55	Seruthunai	
56	Pugazh Thunai	
57	Kotpuli	
58	Pusalar	
59	Nesa Nayanar	Saliyar, weaver who donates clothes to Lord Shiva's devotees
60	Sengenar (Kochengat Chola)	
61	Tiru Nilakanta Yazhpanar	
62	Sadaiya	Sundarar's father
63	Isaignaniyaar	Sundarar's mother; one of the three female Nayanars

== Other saints ==
The 9th-century poet Manikkavacakar was not counted as one of the 63 Nayanars but his works were part of the eighth volume of the Tirumurai.

In Tiruchuli, the Tamil poet-philosopher Valluvar is worshipped as the 64th Nayanar. Valluvar was also added as the 64 saint in the annual Mylapore procession of the 63 Nayanars since c. 1905.

== See also ==
- Manikkavacakar
- Tamil mythology
