= Pennadam Meikandar Temple =

Hindu temple in Tamil Nadu, India

Coordinates: 11.3983°N 79.2341°E

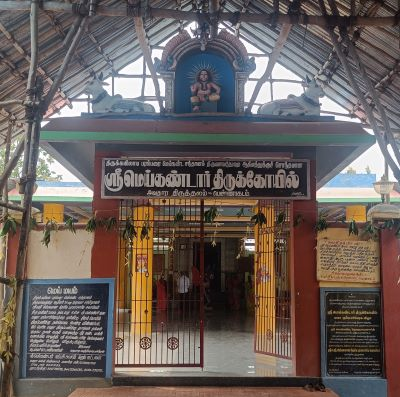

Pennadam Meikandar Temple is a Hindu temple located at Achuthakalappalarmedu at Pennadam in Cuddalore district, Tamil Nadu, India.

== Presiding deity ==
The temple is administered by Thiruvaduthurai Adheenam. The presiding deity is Meykandar and this place is considered as his birth place.

== Structure ==
This temple has among others, front mandapa, sanctum sanctorum, prakara and vimana.

== Kumbhabhishekham ==
The temple was renovated and Kumbhabhishekham was held on 22 June 2014.
