= Meykandar =

13th-century Tamil Hindu philosopher

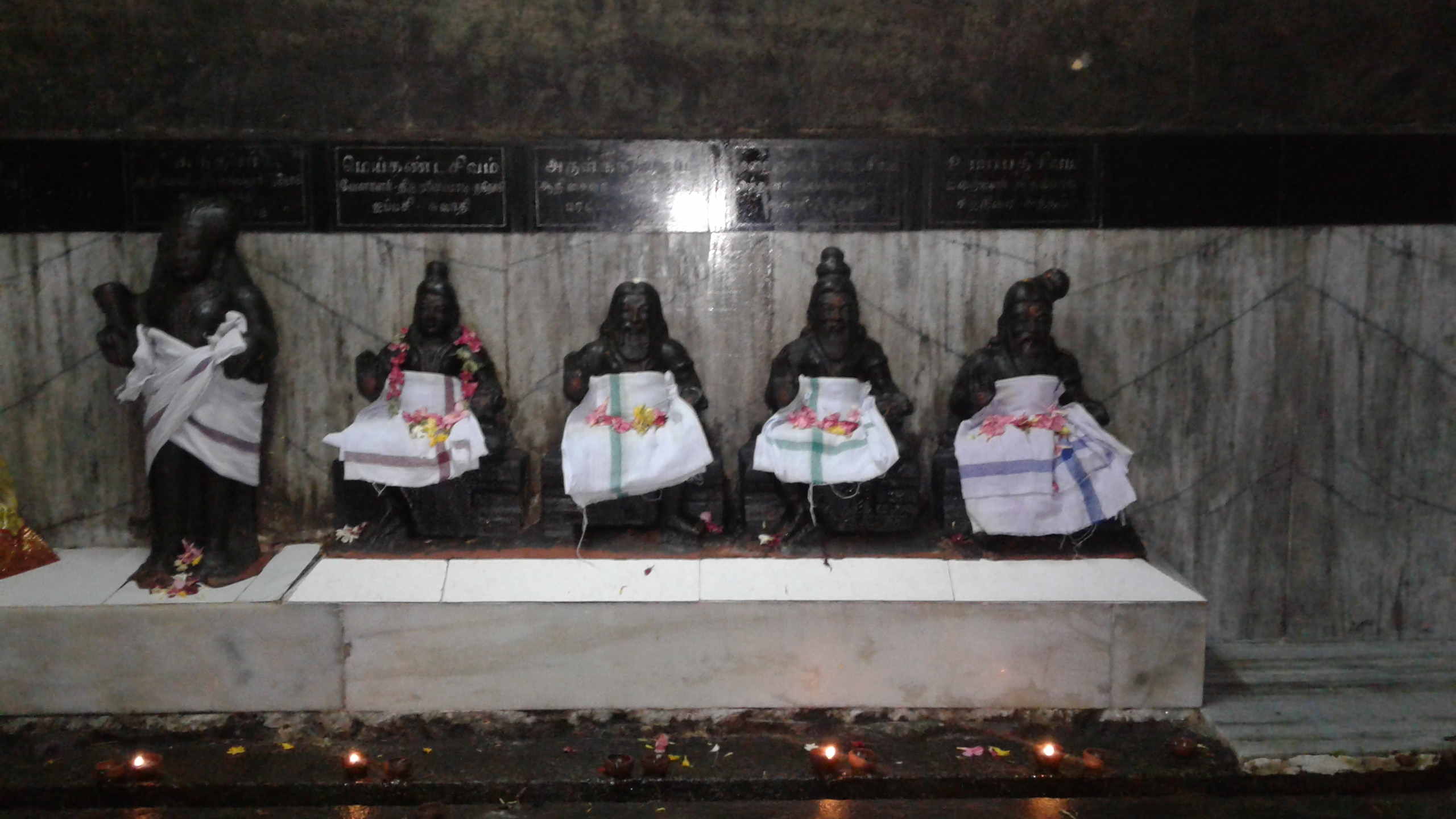
- The figures of Sundarar and four Santāṉa kuravars in which Meykandar appears second from left to right. Karur temple, Tamil Nadu.

Personal life
- Born: Swetavana Perumal Tirupennākadam; Tamil Nadu, India
- Died: 13th century CE Thiruvennainallur; Tamil Nadu, India
- Notable work: Śiva Jñāna Bodham
- Known for: Expounded Shaiva Siddhanta

Religious life
- Religion: Hinduism
- Founder of: Tamil Siddhantism and Lineage of Santana Kuravar
- Philosophy: Shaiva Siddhanta

Religious career
- Teacher: Paranjyoti

Meykandar (Tamil: மெய்கண்டார், Meykaṇṭār, lit. the truth seer), also known as Meykanda Devar, was a 13th-century philosopher and theologian who contributed to the Shaiva Siddhanta school of Shaivism. His literary work known as Śiva Jñāna Bodham (in Tamil) on Shaiva Siddhanta has enjoyed great vogue and prestige among Tamils comparable to other works of Hindu philosophy from the Advaita of Adi Shankara and Vishishtadvaita of Ramanuja.

== Background ==
Meykandar was born to Achyuta Kalappālar and Mangalambikai, ardent devotees of Lord Shiva who lived in the Tirupennākadam village of present-day Cuddalore District, Tamil Nadu. It is said that they were troubled over their childless state which led them to be counselled by their family guru, Sakalāgama Panditar, who advised them to do a penance at Thiruvenkadu Siva Temple. As a result, conceived and gave birth to a boy. They named him "Swethavana Perumāl", after the name of the deity at Thiruvenkadu.

Swetavana Perumal was brought to his maternal hometown Thiruvennainallur by his uncle. One day while he was playing in the street, he was attracted by Rishi Paranjyoti, who "descended from Kailash". Paranjyoti initiated Swetavana Perumal as his disciple and gave him the diksha Nāmam, "Mey Kandār", the Tamil equivalent of his guru's name, Satya njnana darshini. Meykandar composed Śiva Jñāna Bodham in Tamil, the core treatise of Southern Siddhanta tradition. It contains twelve aphorisms (Sutras) running to a total of forty lines, and deals with the nature of the three components of Saivism (Pati-Pashu-Pasam), and the means of attaining oneness with Siva. Many researchers conclude that Śivajñānabodham might have been composed around 1223 CE.

== Santana Kuravar ==
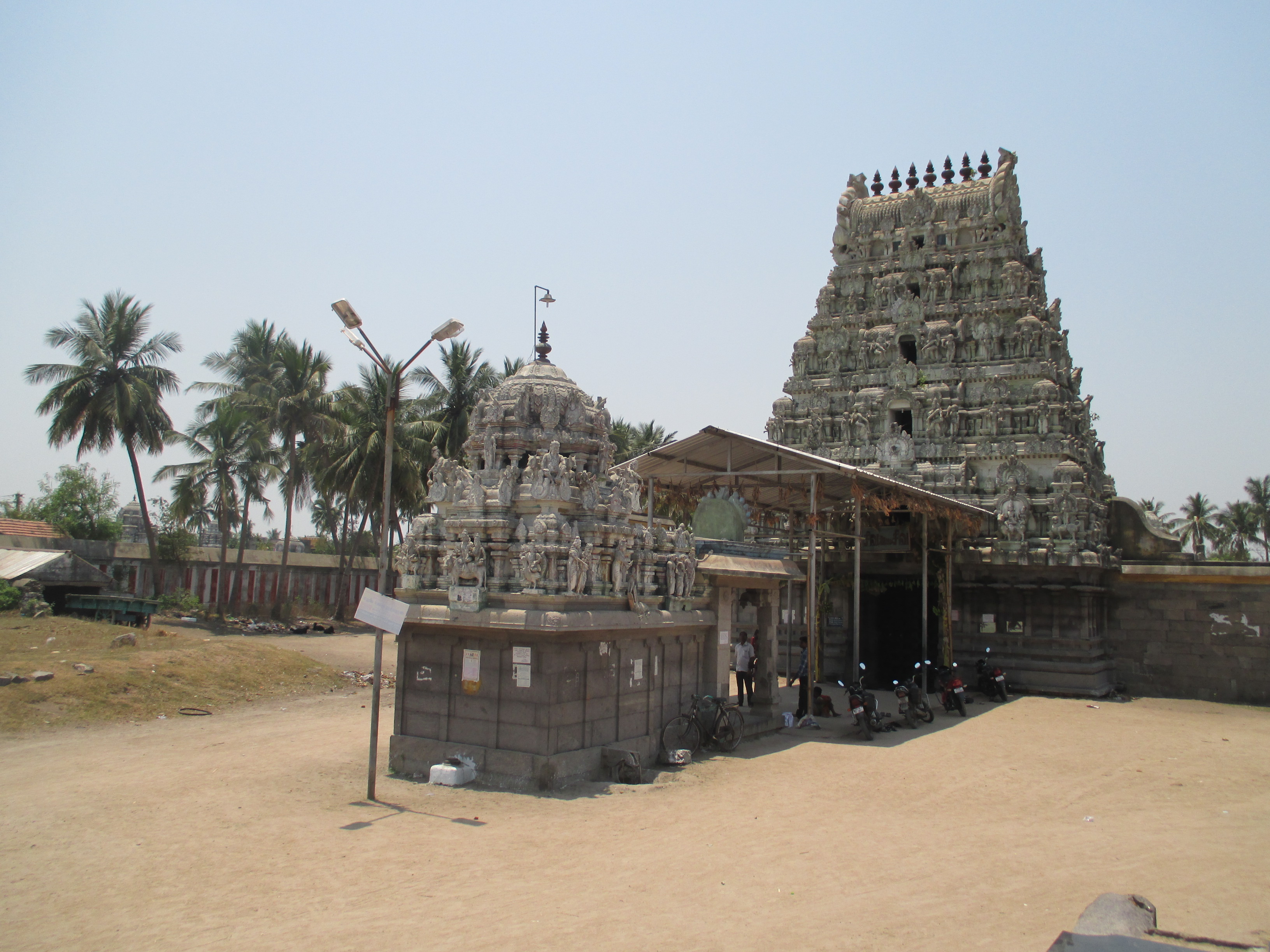
The Sivan kovil at Thiruvennainallur, the living place of Meykandar.

Sakalāgama Panditar, the family guru of Meykandar, once visited Meykandar and surprisingly became his disciple. He, later known as Arulnandi Sivan, composed Shiva Njana Siddiyar and Irupa irupahthu, in which he seconded Meykandar's Śiva Jñāna Bodham. Arulnandi sivan's disciple Marai njana Sampandar was the guru of Umapati Sivan who composed another eight texts explaining Shaiva Siddhanta. These four personages – Meykandar, Arulnandi Sivan, Marai njana Sampandar and Umapati Sivan are revered by the Tamil Siddhantins as "Santāna Kuravars" (Lineage of Gurus).

== Meykandar Siddhantism ==
Shaiva Siddhanta Sampradaya was spread by Santana Kuravars during 13th and 14th centuries in Tamil land is known as "Meykandar Sampradaya" in philosophical perspective. It is also considered as a branch of Nandinatha Sampradaya, which flourished from the eight direct disciples (Sanatkumarar, Sanakar, Sanadanar, Sananthanar, Shivayogamuni, Patanjali, Vyaghrapada, and Tirumular) of Nandinatha. Meykandar Sampradaya is associated with the teachings of first disciple of Nandinatha – Sanatkumarar.

There are totally fourteen texts of Santana Kuravar and others admired by Tamil Saivites as Meykanda Sathirangal (Shastras of Meykandar or Shastras that perceived the truth). Though Shaiva Siddhanta is often identified as a pluralistic philosophy, it declares itself Vaidika Shuddadvaita (Vedic Pure advaita) claiming that it interprets Advaita as it is.

== See more ==
- Shaiva Siddhanta
- Sampradaya
