= Jambukaranyesvarar Temple, Kundalur =

Hindu temple in Tiruvarur district

- Jambukaranyeswarar Temple, Koonthalur, Tiruvarur, Tamil Nadu

Religion
- Affiliation: Hinduism
- District: Tiruvarur
- Deity: Lord Shiva

Location
- Location: Kundalur
- State: Tamil Nadu
- Country: India
- Interactive map of Jambukaranyesvarar Temple, Kundalur
- Coordinates: 10.9302°N 79.5254°E

Architecture
- Type: Dravidian architecture
- Elevation: 38.26 m (126 ft)

Jambukaranyesvarar Temple is a Hindu temple dedicated to the deity Shiva, located at Kundalur in Tiruvarur district in Tamil Nadu, India.

== Vaippu Sthalam ==
It is one of the shrines of the Vaippu Sthalams sung by Tamil Saivite Nayanar Appar.

== Presiding deity ==
The presiding deity in the garbhagriha is represented by the lingam known as Jambukaranyesvarar. The Goddess is known as Anandavalli.

== Specialities ==
As palm trees were found in this place this place was called as Kundalur. Roma Mahirishi worshipped here and so this place was also called as Kundalur. Also known as Jambu Karanyam, Sita worshipped here. Appar says one can see Kailasanathar in this place and also in other places such as Senganur, Kumari Kongu, Adigai Veerattam, Thiruvaiyaru, Seeyathamangai, Thiruvamathur, Kandiyur Veerattam and Karukavur. This temple is also called as Muruga Temple, as the Muruga of this temple is praised in Thiruppugazh by Arunagirinathar. Muruga of this temple is having one face and four hands. He is flanked by his consorts, and is in standing posture. The face of the peacock is found facing north. It is said that this peacock belonged to the period of pre-Sura Samhaaram. So this peacock is called as Deva Mayil.

== Structure ==
This temple has no gopuram. It has one entrance. The presiding deity is facing east and the Goddess is facing south. In the prakara, Dakshinamurthy, Lingodbhava, Muruga, Mahalakshmi and Durga are found. Chandikesvarar is found in a separate shrine. The temple tank are Sita Tirtta and Kumara Tirtta.

== Location ==
This temple is located in Kumbakonam-Nachiarkoil-Poonthottam road, very near to Iravancheri, at a distance of 20 km from Kumbakonam. This is opened for devotees from 9.00 am -10.00 am and 5.30 to 7.30 pm.
