= Abirameswarar Temple =

Shiva temple in Tamil Nadu, India

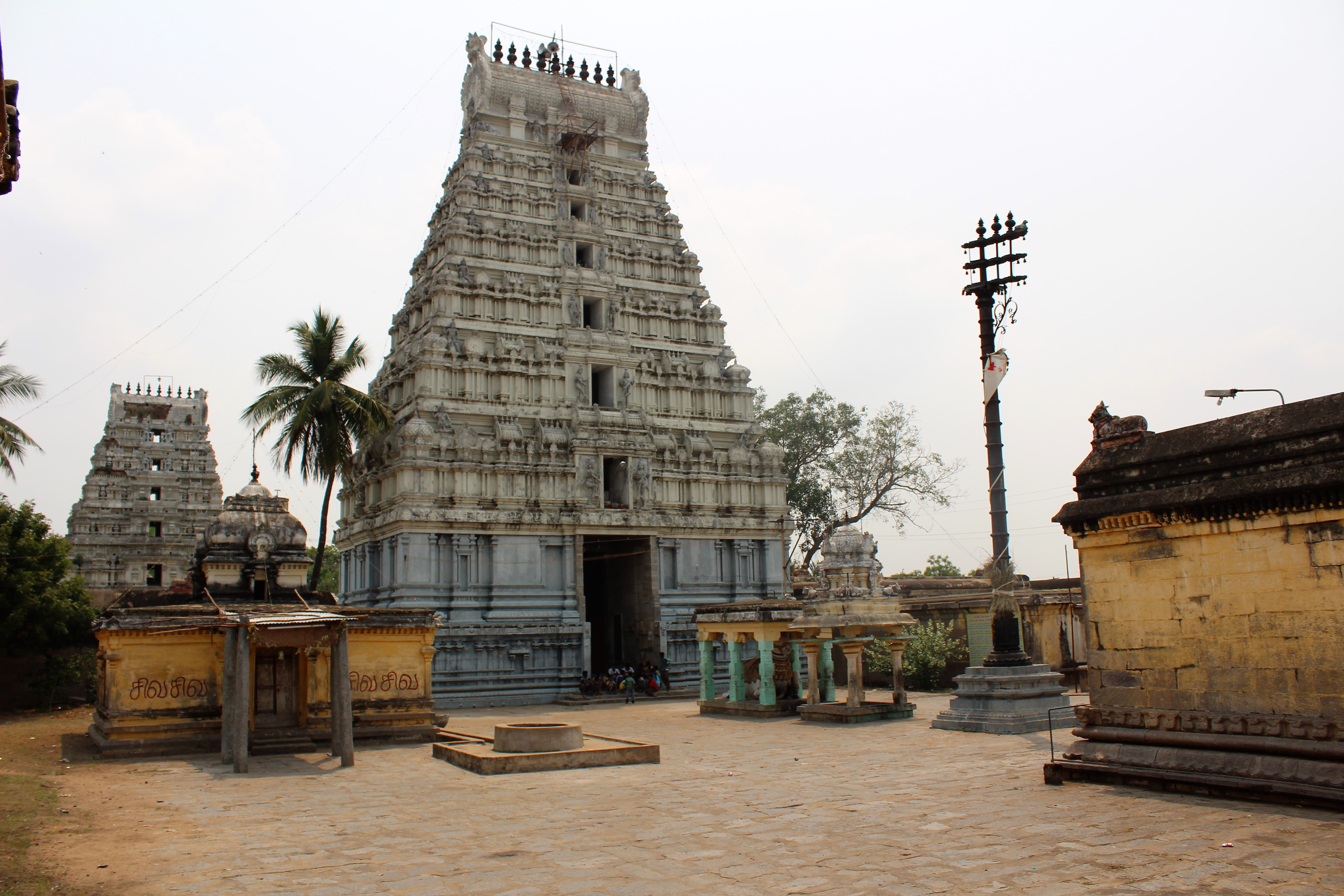

- Location in Tamil Nadu

Religion
- Affiliation: Hinduism
- District: Viluppuram
- Deity: Abirameswarar(Shiva)

Location
- State: Tamil Nadu
- Country: India
- Coordinates: 11°58′3.5″N 79°27′56.5″E

Architecture
- Type: Dravidian architecture
- Creator: Cholas and Atchudevaraya of Vijayanagar Dynasty

Abirameswarar Temple (also called Thiruvamathur Temple) is a Hindu temple dedicated to the deity Shiva, located in Thiruvamaathur, a village in Viluppuram district in the Indian state of Tamil Nadu. Shiva is worshiped as Abirameswarar, and is represented by the lingam. His consort Parvati is depicted as Manonmani Amman. The temple is located on the Chennai - Villupuram highway. The presiding deity is revered in the 7th century Tamil Saiva canonical work, the Tevaram, written by Tamil saint poets known as the nayanmars and classified as Paadal Petra Sthalam.

The temple complex covers an area of two acres and all its shrines are enclosed with concentric rectangular walls. The temple has a number of shrines, with those of Abirameswarar being the most prominent. There is a temple opposite to the premises that houses the shrine of Muthamman, the consort of Abirameswarar.

The original complex is believed to have been built by Cholas.And Main temple was built by Achyuta Deva Raya of Vijayanagara Empire. In modern times, the temple is maintained and administered by the Hindu Religious and Charitable Endowments Department of the Government of Tamil Nadu.

== Legend and history ==
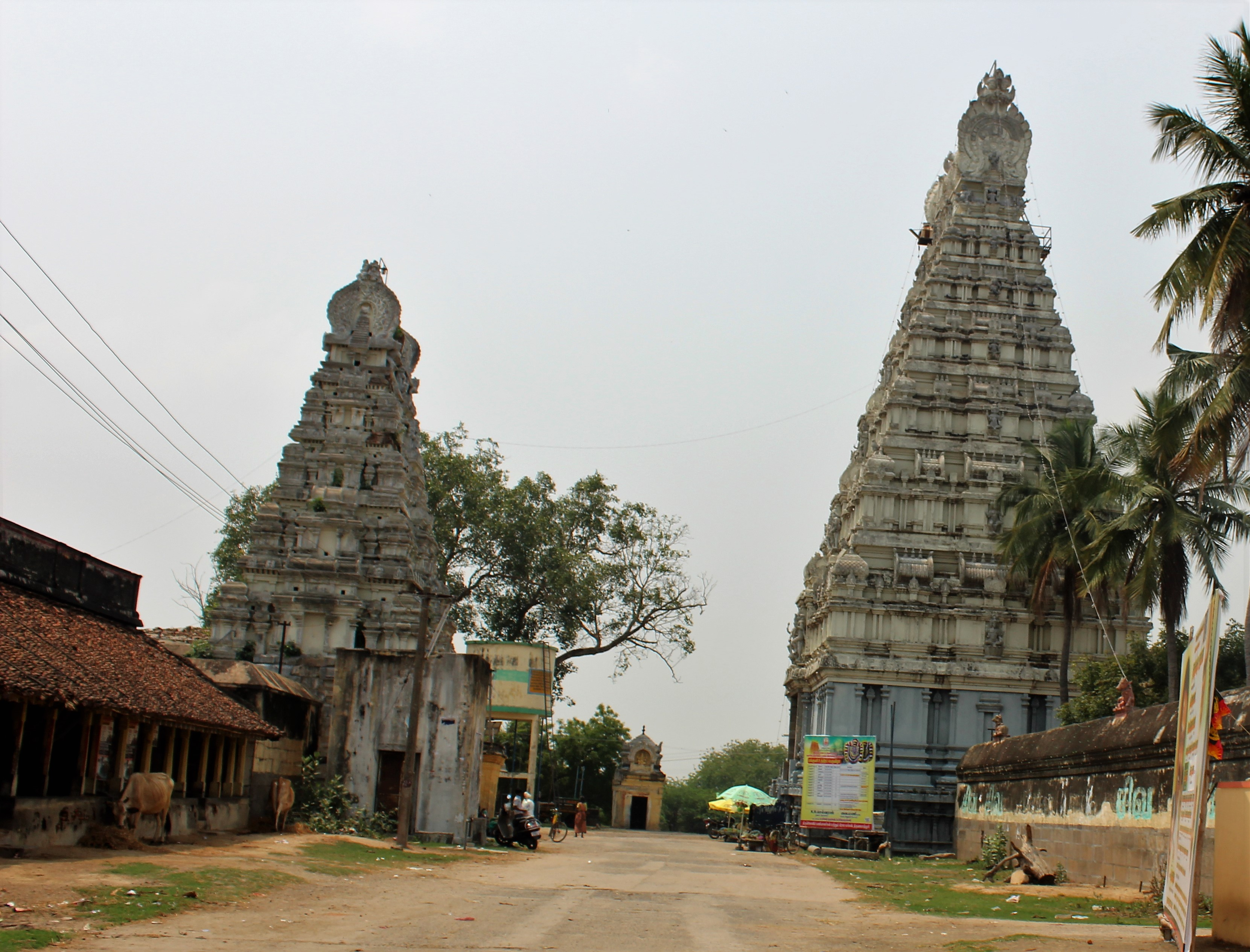
The twin temples located opposite to each other

As per Hindu legend, during the original creation, cows were without horns and all the other predators were troubling them. They prayed to Shiva to provide them horns. Shiva was pleased with the devotion and offered them horns. Since cows (called aa in Tamil) got horns at this place, it came to be known as Thiruamathur. The presiding image of lingam is sported holding the hooves of cow. As per another legend, the image of Ambal is sported with the tail of snake. There is a small hole in the wall between the shrines of Shiva and Parvathi located in opposite shrines through which the deities see each other.

The original structure is believed to be existent from time immemorial, while the later additions are believed to have been built by Cholas, Pallavas, and the main temple was built by Atchudevaraya of Vijayanagar Dynasty. There are inscriptions from later Chola emperors like Rajaraja Chola I (985–1014), Kulothunga Chola I (1070–1120), and Rajendra Chola III (1246–1279). Rajanarayana Sambuvaraya was a chieftain of Medieval Cholas whose contributions are documented in lithic inscriptions across various temples in modern-day Villupuram, Cuddalore, Tiruvannamalai and Kanchipuram districts and also in his Sanskrit work Madhuravijayam. He repaired, revived the services and inaugurated festivals of the temple.

A separate temple of Muthambigai faces west opposite the main temple.

== Religious importance ==
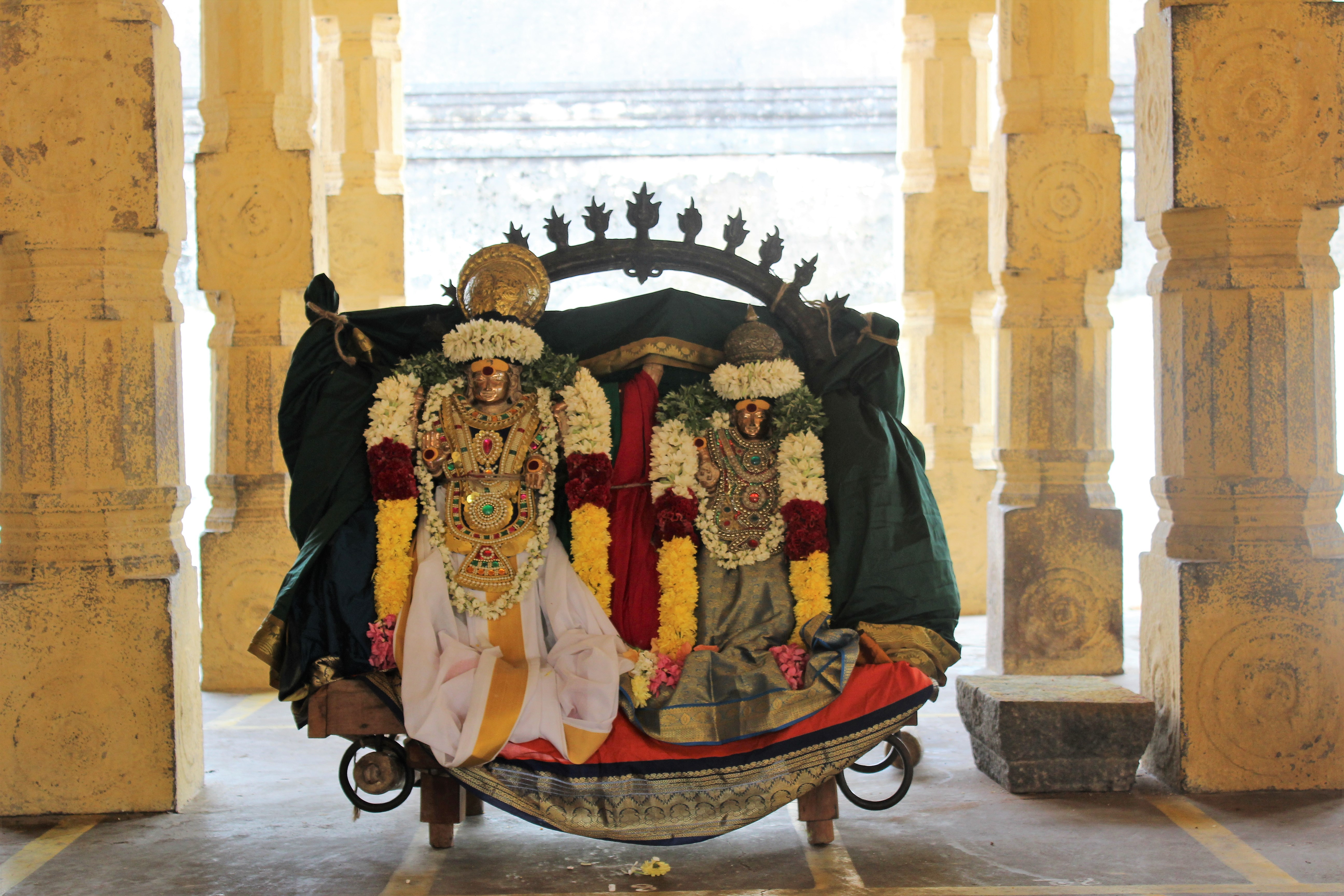
Festive images on the roof of the sanctum

It is one of the shrines of the 275 Paadal Petra Sthalams - Shiva Sthalams glorified in the early medieval Tevaram poems by Tamil Saivite Nayanars Appar. Appar is believed to have visited the temple during the series of visits from Thiruvennainallur to Thirukovilur and Pennadam.
