= Marundeeswarar Temple, T. Edayar =

Marudeeswarar Temple
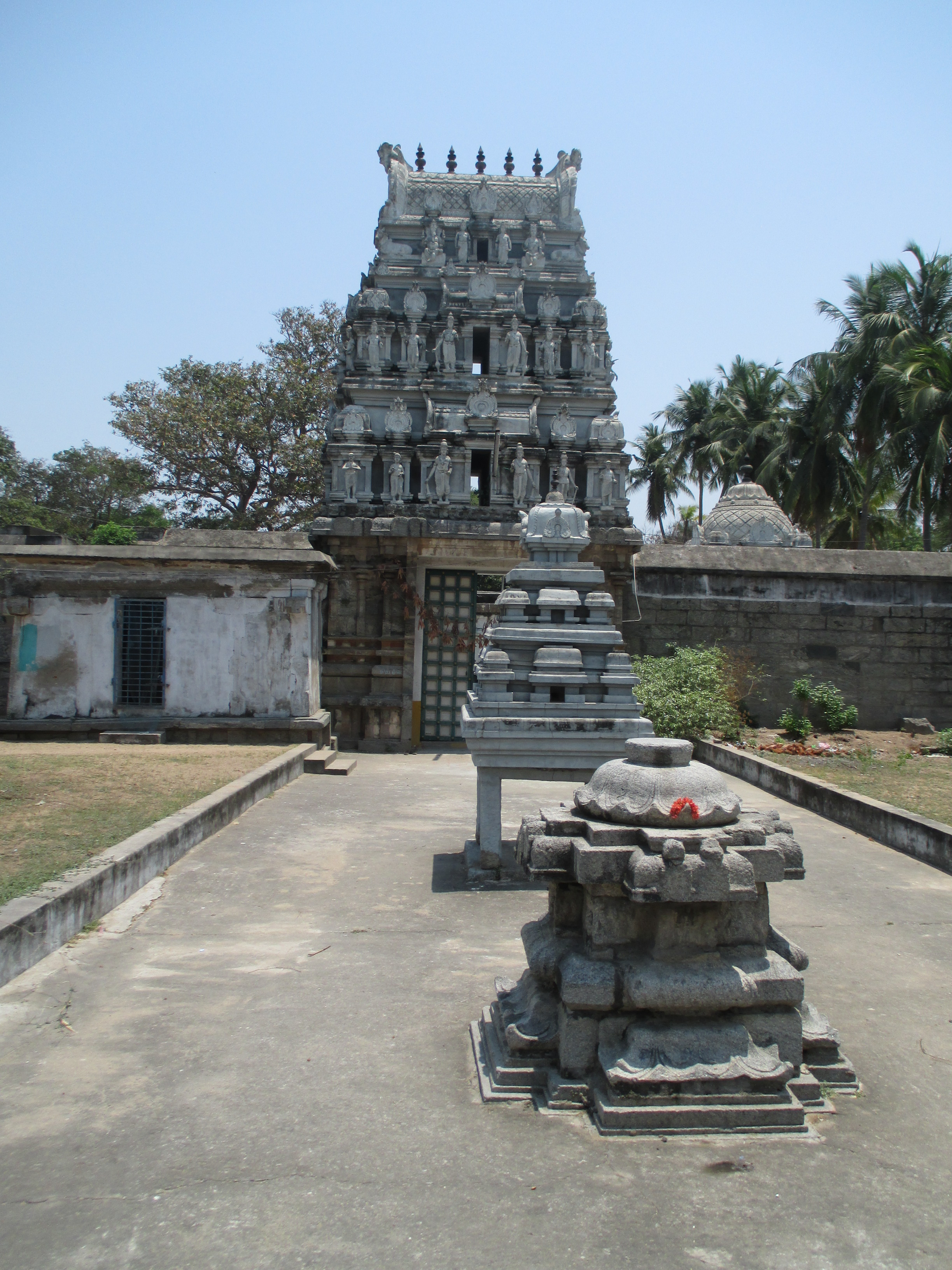

- Location in Tamil Nadu

Religion
- Affiliation: Hinduism
- District: Viluppuram
- Deity: Marudeeswarar (Shiva)

Location
- State: Tamil Nadu
- Country: India
- Coordinates: 11°53′35″N 79°20′12″E

Architecture
- Type: Dravidian architecture

Marudeeswarar Temple (also called Idayatrunathar Temple) is a Hindu temple to the deity Shiva, in T. Edaiyar, a village in Viluppuram district in the Indian state of Tamil Nadu. Shiva is worshipped as Marudeeswarar, and is represented by the lingam. His consort Parvati is depicted as Gnanambigai. The temple is located on the southern banks of the Thenpennai River on the Thirukoilur - Thiruvennainallur road. The presiding deity is mentioned in the 7th century Tamil Saiva canonical work, the Tevaram.

The temple complex covers an area of one acre and all its shrines are enclosed with concentric rectangular walls. The shrines of Marudeeswarar and his consort Gnanambigai are the most prominent.

The original complex is believed to have been built by Cholas, while the present masonry structure was built during the 16th century. In modern times, the temple is maintained and administered by the Hindu Religious and Charitable Endowments Department of the Government of Tamil Nadu.

== Legend and history ==
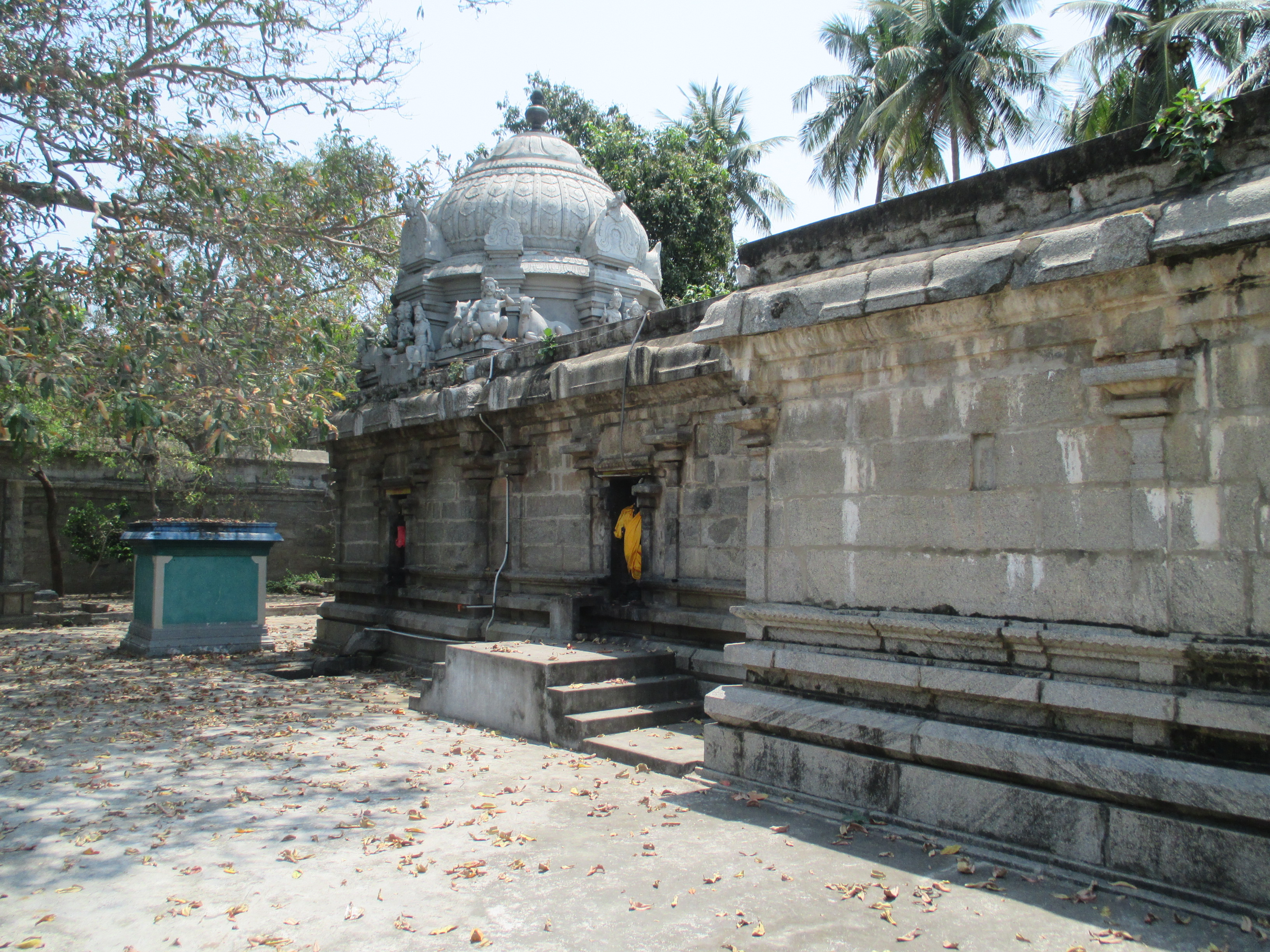
The central shrine as viewed from the first precinct

As per Hindu legend, sage Sukhabrahmma was overhearing the Sivarahasya, the secret that Shiva was telling his wife Parvathi in Kailasa. Shiva cursed the sage for the offence. The sage prayed to Shiva to propitiate his sins - Shiva was pleased by the devotion and gave him a boon that he would be born as sage Vyasa in his next birth. It is believed that sage Vyasa resided in this place and worshipped Shiva to relieve off his curse. As per another legend, sage Agastya installed and worshipped a Linga, which is called Agastya Linga. Another legend indicates that Somaskanda depiction is usually indicated with child Skanda (Muruga) depicted between Shiva and Parvathi. This temple has Bala Vinayaga in place of Skanda in the Somaskanda image.

The original complex is believed to have been built by Cholas, while the present masonry structure was built during the 16th century. There are inscriptions from later Chola emperors like Rajaraja Chola I (985–1014), Kulothunga Chola I (1070–1120) and Rajendra Chola III (1246–1279). There are inscriptions from Pandya kings like Maravarman Sundara Pandyan (1216–1238), Maarvarman Vikrama Pandiyan and Maravarman Veerpandiyan. The contributions of the kings of the Vijayanagara Empire like Achyuta Raya, Sadasiva Raya (1542–1570) and Rama Deva are also found in the inscriptions.

The eighth century poet Sundarar mentioned Idaiyatreeswarar.

== Architecture ==
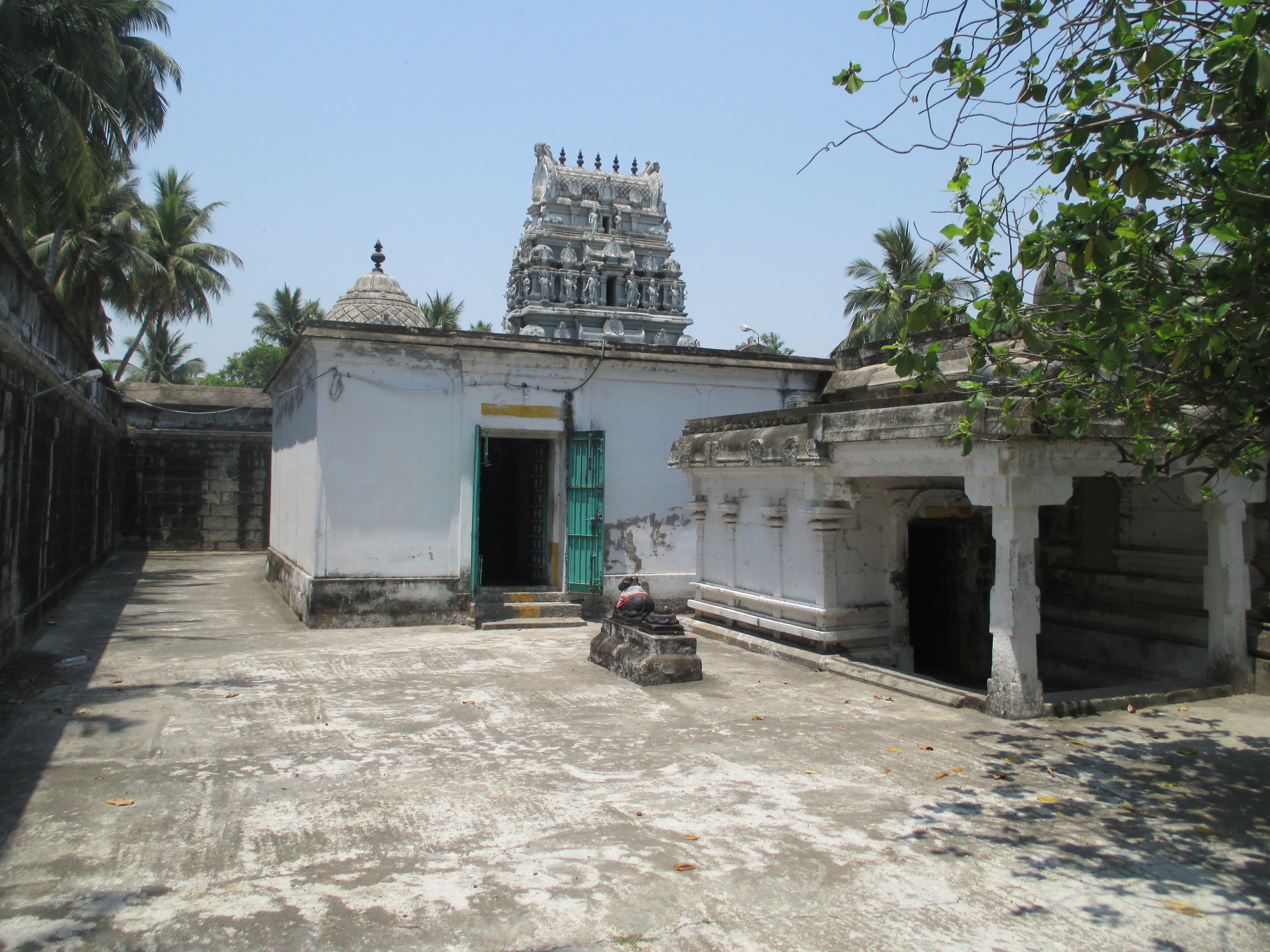
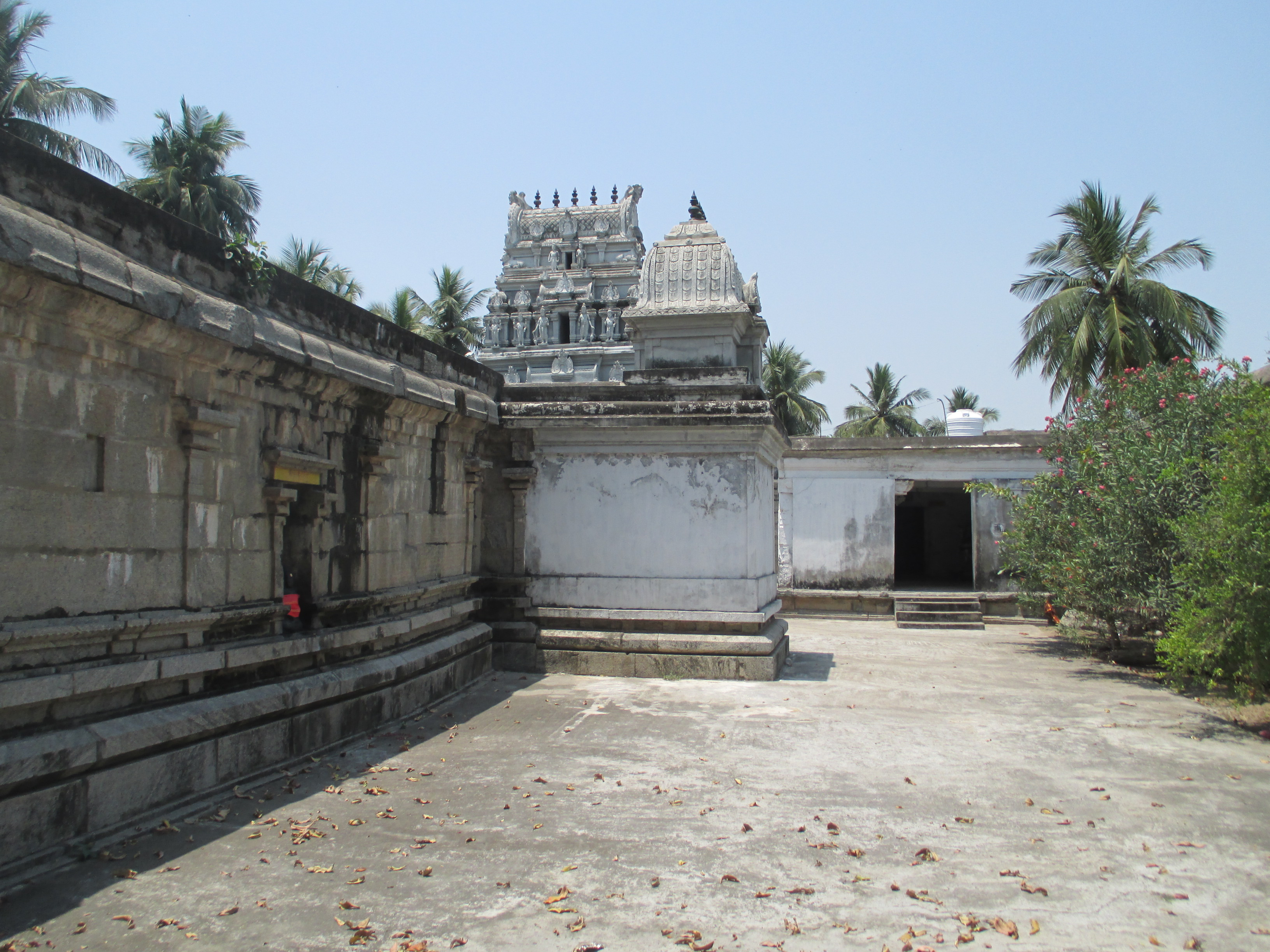
The shrines of the temple

Marundeeswarar temple is on the southern banks of Thenpennai River on the Thirukoilur - Thiruvennainallur road in a village called T. Edaiyar, around 5 km (3.1 mi) from Thiruvennainallur. The temple has a three-tiered gopuram, the gateway tower and all the shrines of the temple are enclosed in concentric rectangular granite walls. The central shrine is approached through the gateway tower, a flag post, a mukha mandapa and an Ardha mandapa, all of which are axial to the sanctum. The central shrine houses the image of Marundeeswarar in the form of Lingam. The shrine of Irulneeki Thayar (also called Anthaga Nivarini), facing west is located in a shrine behind sanctum. The central shrine is approached through a Mahamandapam and Arthamandapam. As in other Shiva temples in Tamil Nadu, the shrines of Vinayaka, Murugan, Navagraha, Chandekeswara and Durga are located around the precinct of the main shrine. There is a shrine of Agastheeswarar in the second precinct in the southeastern direction. The shrine of Gnanambigai is on the southwestern corner of the temple facing east. The sun's rays fall directly on the image of Lingam during two days of April. The temple tree, Maruda maram, is located in the second precinct.

== See also ==
- Kripapureeswarar Temple
