= Veerateeswarar Temple, Thirukovilur =

Shiva temple in Tamil Nadu, India

Veerateeswarar Temple, Tirukoilur
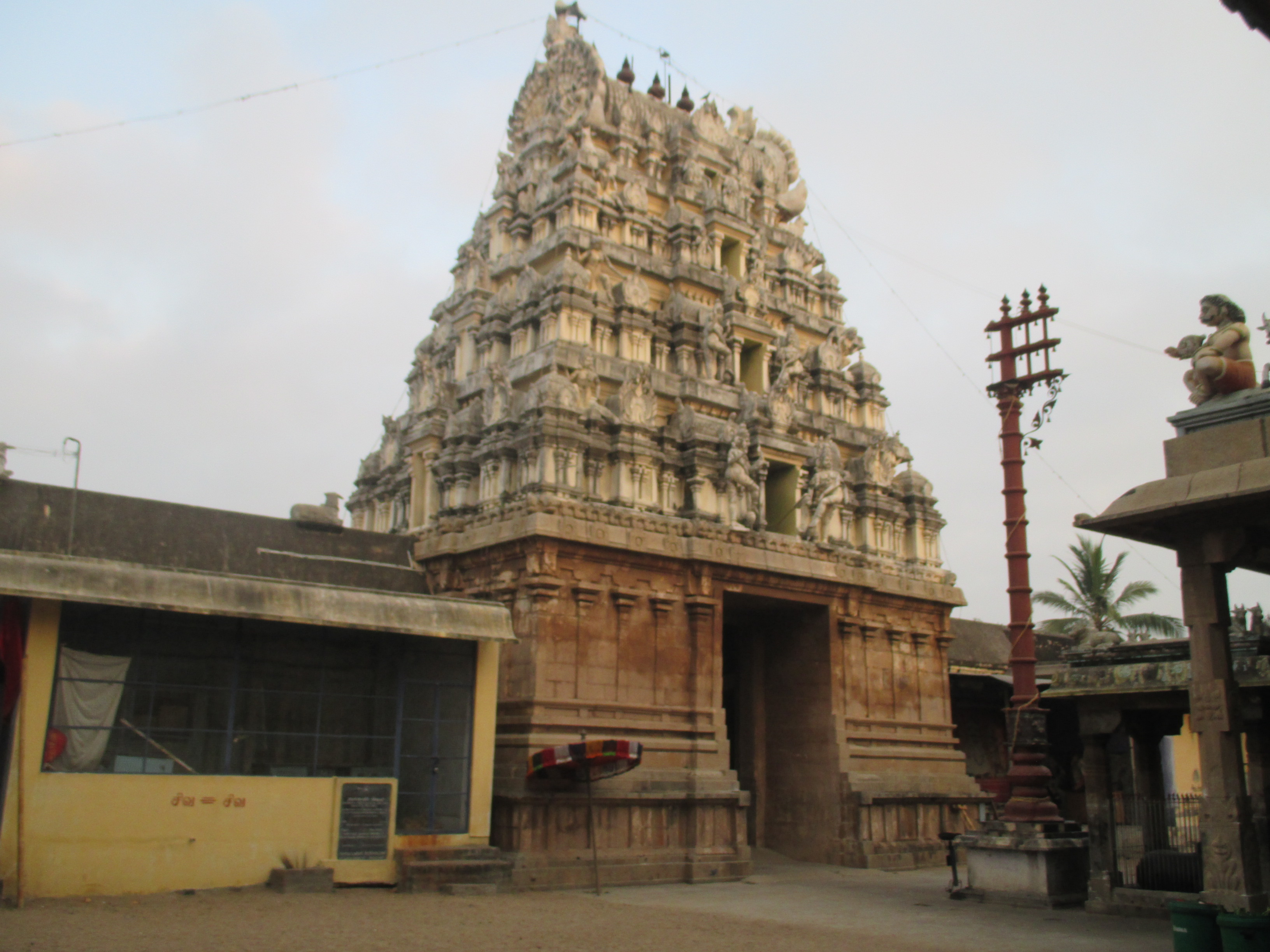

- Location in Tamil Nadu

Religion
- Affiliation: Hinduism
- District: Kallakurichi
- Deity: Veerateeswarar(Shiva) Periyanayagi, Sivanandavalli(Parvathi)

Location
- Location: Thirukoilur
- State: Tamil Nadu
- Country: India
- Coordinates: 11°58′17″N 79°12′38″E

Architecture
- Type: Dravidian architecture

Veerateeswarar Temple (also called Thirukoilur Veerattam) in Tirukoilur, a panchayat town in Kallakurichi district in the South Indian state of Tamil Nadu, is dedicated to the Hindu god Shiva. Constructed in the Dravidian style of architecture, the temple is believed to have been built during the Cholas period in the 10th century. Shiva is worshipped as Veerateeswarar and his consort Parvathi as Periyanayagi.

The presiding deity is revered in the 7th century Tamil Saiva canonical work, the Tevaram, written by Tamil saint poets known as the Nayanmars and classified as Paadal Petra Sthalam. A granite wall surrounds the temple, enclosing all its shrines. The temple has two three-tiered Rajagopurams, the gateway tower, one each for the Veerateeswarar and Periyanagi shrines.

The temple is open from 6 am - 12 pm and 4-8:30 pm on all days except during new moon days when it is open the full day. Six daily rituals and three yearly festivals are held at the temple, of which the Masimaham festival celebrated during the Tamil month of Maasi (February - March), Karthigai Somavaram during the Tamil month of Karthigai (October - November) and Manickavasagar festival during the Tamil month of Margazhi (December - January) being the most prominent festivals. The temple is maintained and administered by the Hindu Religious and Endowment Board of the Government of Tamil Nadu.

== Legend ==
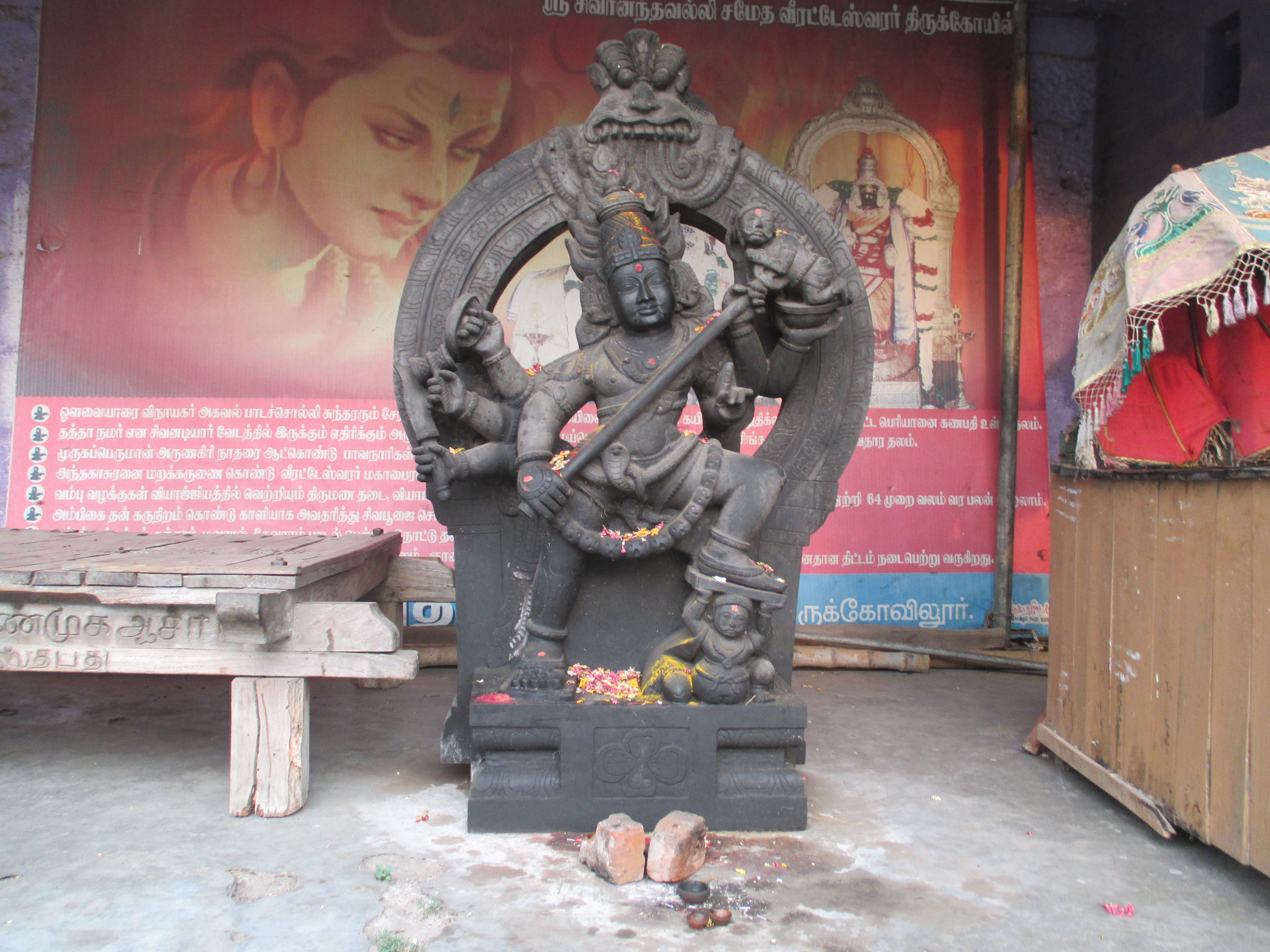
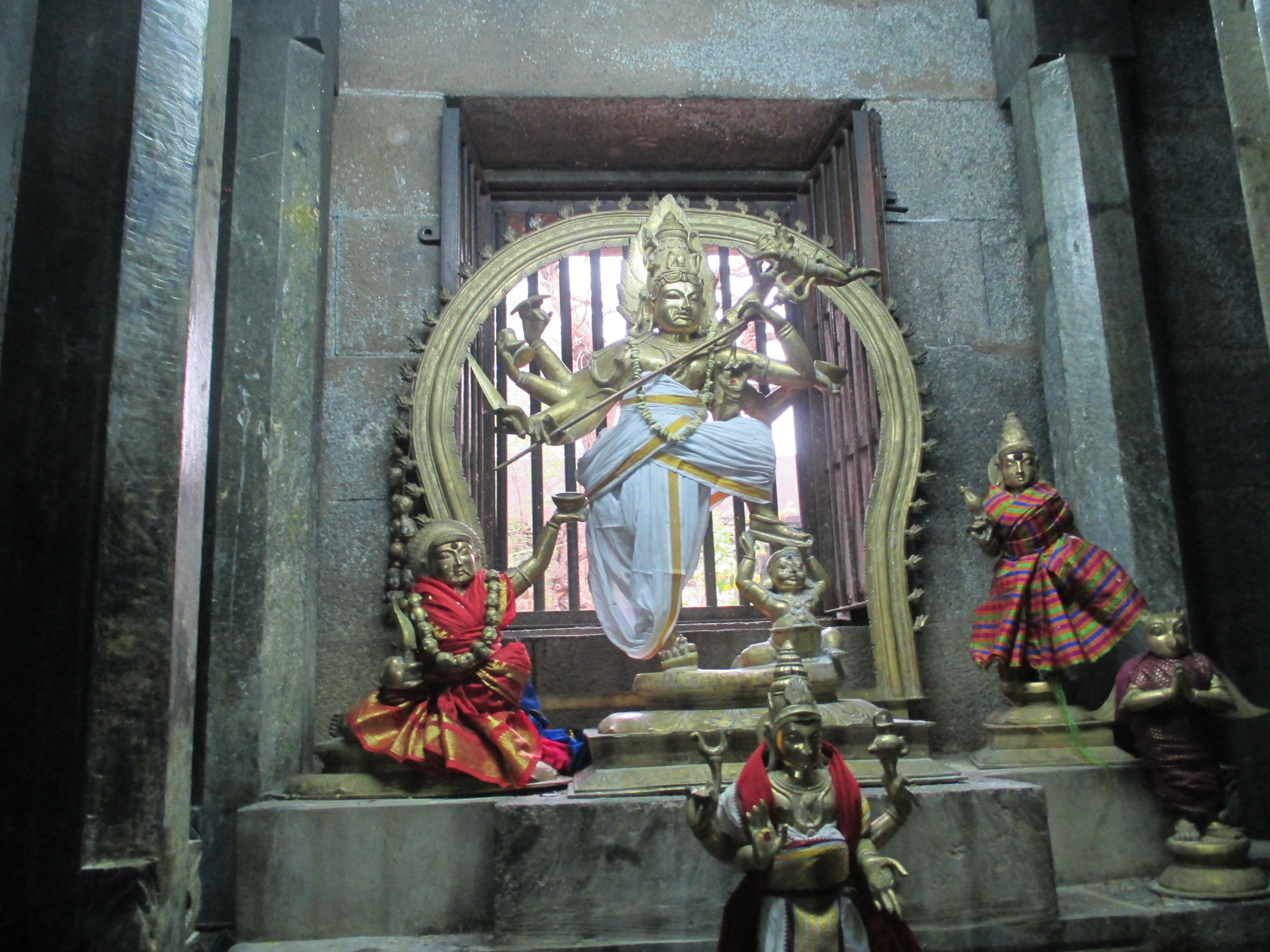
Stone and metal images of Andakasura in the temple

As per Hindu legend, Shiva appeared in the form of Andakasura samhara murthy to slay the demon king Andakasura. Andakasura was a demon who attained powers close to immortality on account of his severe penance to Brahma, the Hindu god of creation. The boon attained had just one condition that when he lusts his mother, he would be killed. He made undue use of his powers and was troubling humans and celestial deities. During one such encounters, he started lusting toward Parvathi, the wife of Shiva and who was like his mother. Shiva appeared as Andakasura samhara murthy and slayed Andaka with his trident. Realising his mistake, he pleaded Shiva to make him a devotee of his in the next birth. It is believed that Shiva readily agreed and Andaka was born as Gana Bhringi.

The temple finds mention in Sangam literature in Tamil from 3rd BC to 3rd centuries CE like Agananuru, Purananuru, Natrinai and Kurunthokai. Malayaman Tirumudikari, the ruler of Thirukovilur, was praised in the texts for his charitable disposition to the institutions. It is believed that Avvaiyar, the celebrated Sangam period poet, arranged marriage for two chieftains at this place. Poet Kapilar is believed to have found suitable grooms for king Pari's daughters Angavai and Sangavai at this place and set himself on fire. The event is commemorated every year in a huge rock called Kapilar Kal, where a small shrine exists even in modern times. It is reenacted during the Maasi Magam festival.

Rajanarayana Sambuvaraya was a chieftain of Medieval Cholas whose contributions are documented in his inscriptions across various temples in modern-day Villupuram, Cuddalore, Tiruvannamalai and Kanchipuram districts and also in his Sanskrit work Madhuravijayam. He repaired, revived the services and inaugurated festivals of the temple.

== Architecture ==
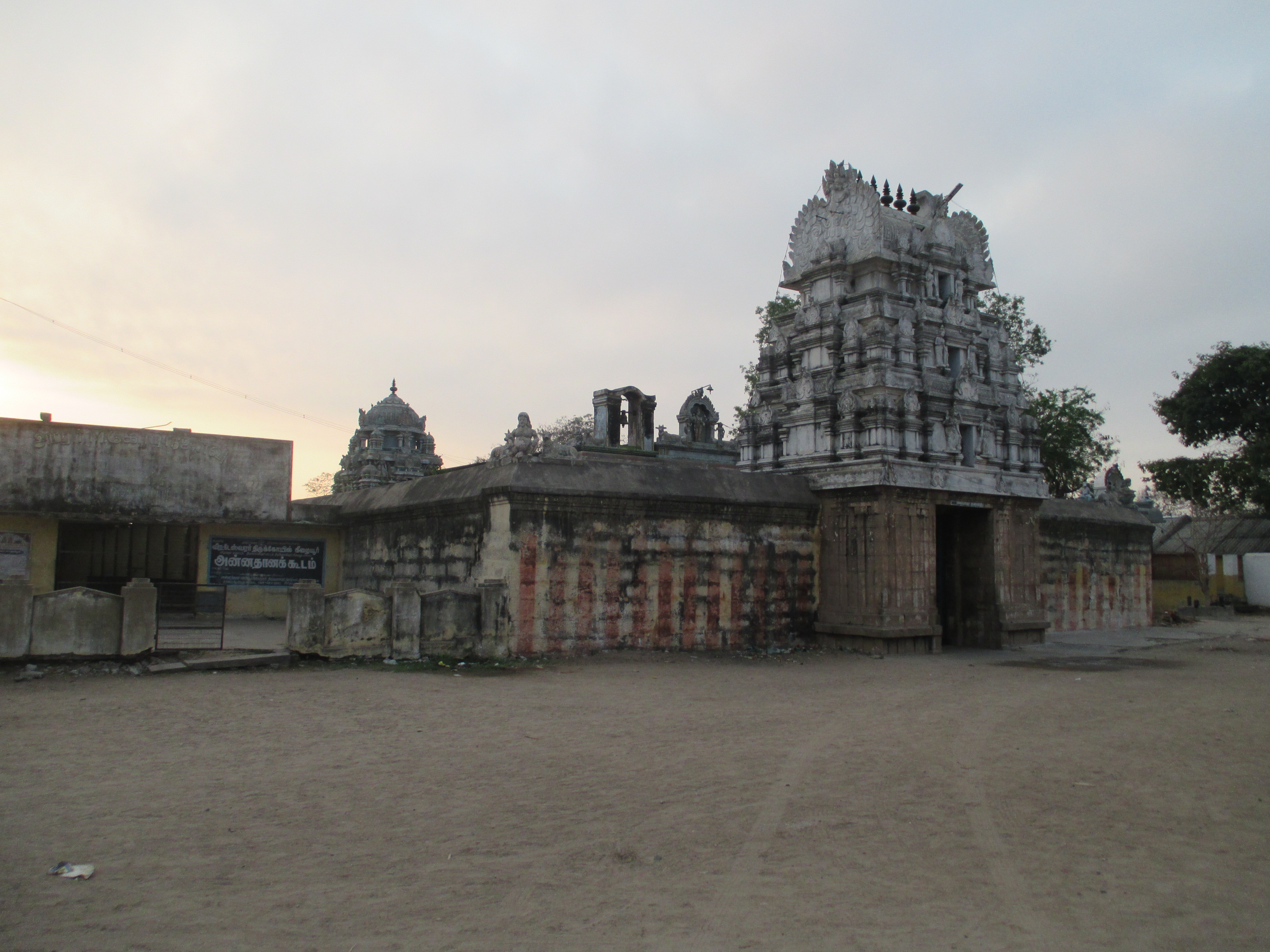
Image of the Amman shrine

Veerateeswarar temple is located in Thirukoilur, a town panchayat located on the banks of Then Pennai river, located 40 km (25 mi) from Villupuram. The temple has two parallel structures, each of which has a three-tiered Rajagopuram, the gateway tower. The temple has large granite rectangular walls that houses all the shrines. The sanctum sanctorum houses the image of Veerateeswarar in the form of Lingam, an iconic form of Shiva. There is an Ardha Mandapa and a Mukha mandapa, pillared halls leading to the sanctum. The first precinct has the shrines of Vinayakar, Murugan, Durga, Dakshinamurthy and Chandikeswara. The first precinct also houses metal image of Nataraja, Somaskanda and Andhakasura. The second structure houses the image of Periyanayagi. Like the Shiva temple, here also the sanctum is approached through an Ardha Mandapa and Mukha mandapa. There is a precinct around the sanctum.

== Festival ==
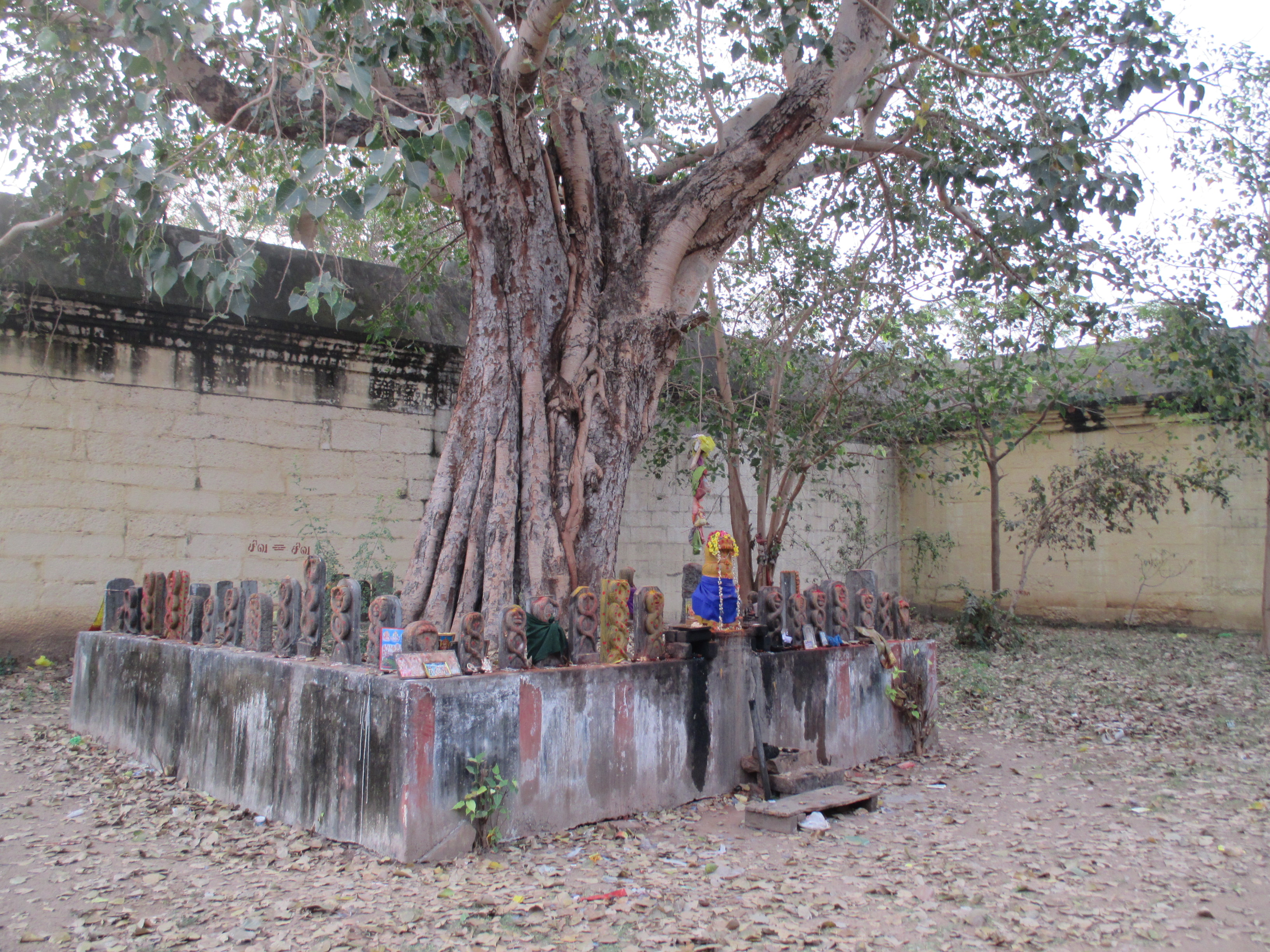
Temple tree where worshippers tie knots in belief

The temple follows Saivite tradition. The temple priests perform the pooja (rituals) during festivals and on a daily basis. As at other Shiva temples of Tamil Nadu, the priests belong to the Shaivaite community, a Brahmin sub-caste. The temple rituals are performed six times a day: Kalasanthi at 6:00 a.m., Uchikalam at 11:30 p.m., Sayarakshai at 6:00 p.m., Irandam kalam at 7:30 p.m., and Ardha jamam between 8:00 - 8:00 p.m. Each ritual has three steps: alangaram (decoration), neivethanam (food offering) and deepa aradanai (waving of lamps) for both Veerateeswarar and Amirthambigai.There are weekly, monthly and fortnightly rituals performed in the temple. The temple is open from 6am - 12 pm and 4-8:30 pm.

The Maasimagam festival celebrated during the Tamil month of Maasi (February - March), Karthigai Somavaram during the Tamil month of Karthigai (October - November) and Manickavasagar festival during the Tamil month of Margazhi (December - January) are the most prominent festivals celebrated in the temple. There are other common festivals like Shivaratri, Vinayaga Chaturthi, Vijayadasami and Karthigai Deepam celebrated in the temple. There is a wish tree in the compound having Naga, a snake representation. Childless couple pray for the attaining child by placing or installing the stone symbols praying Vakrakali.

== Religious significance ==
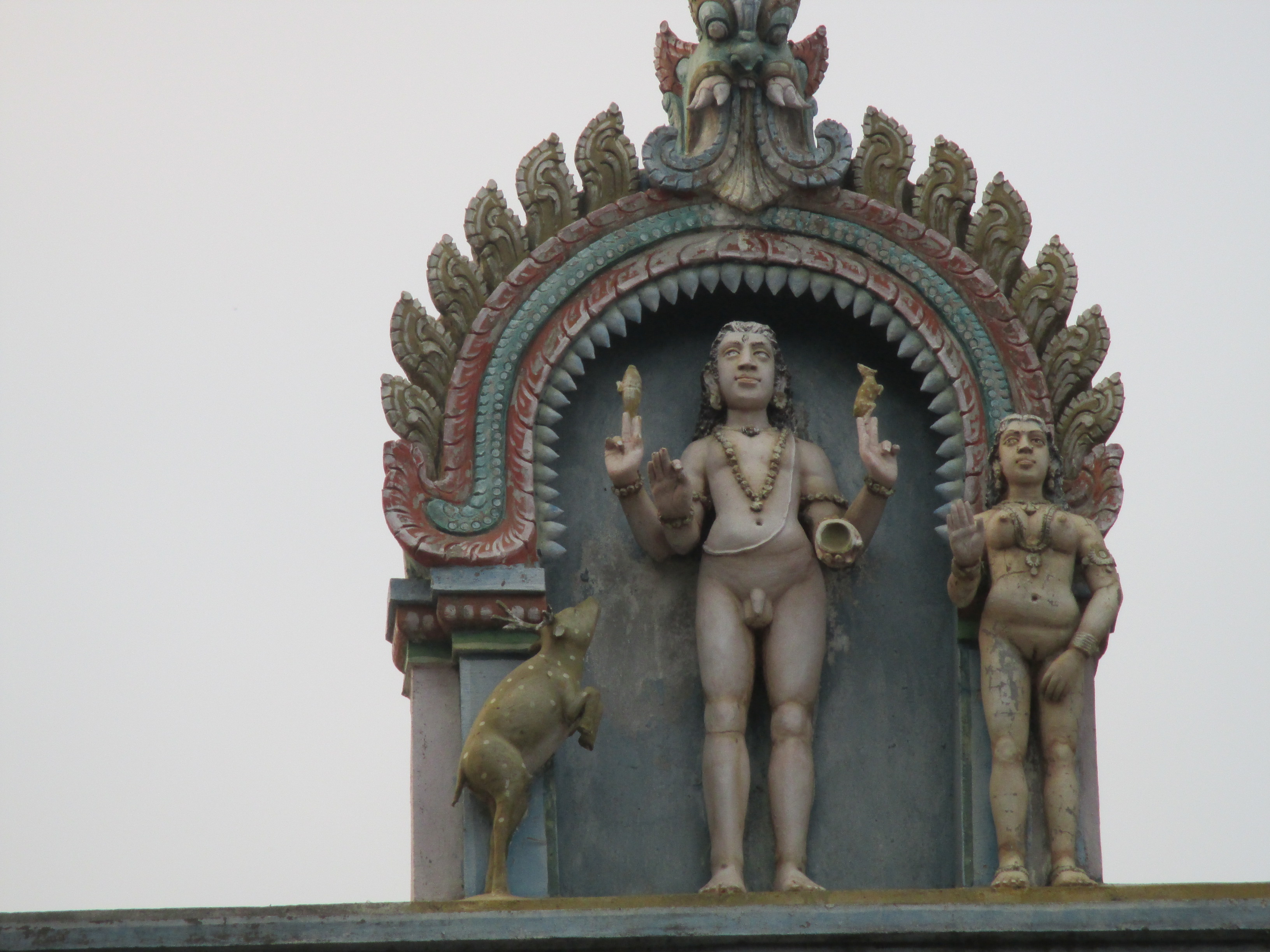
The legend of Bhikshatana is built in a stucco image in the temple

Tirugnana Sambandar, a 7th-century Tamil Saivite poet, venerated Veerateeswarar in ten verses in Tevaram, compiled as the First Tirumurai. Appar, a contemporary of Sambandar, also venerated Veerateeswarar in ten verses in Tevaram, compiled as the Fifth Tirumurai. Sundarar, a contemporary of Sambandar, also venerated Veerateeswarar in ten verses in Tevaram, compiled as the Seventh Tirumurai. As the temple is revered in Tevaram, it is classified as Paadal Petra Sthalam, one of the 275 temples that find mention in the Saiva canon. Appar is believed to have visited the temple during the series of visits from Thiruvennainallur to Thiruvamathur and Pennadam.

Thirukovilur is one of the eight Veeratta Stalam temples signifying Shiva's victories over demons or deities and also as places where he is believed to have performed with fury.
