= Sudarkozhundeeswarar Temple, Pennadam =

Sudarkozhundeeswarar Temple
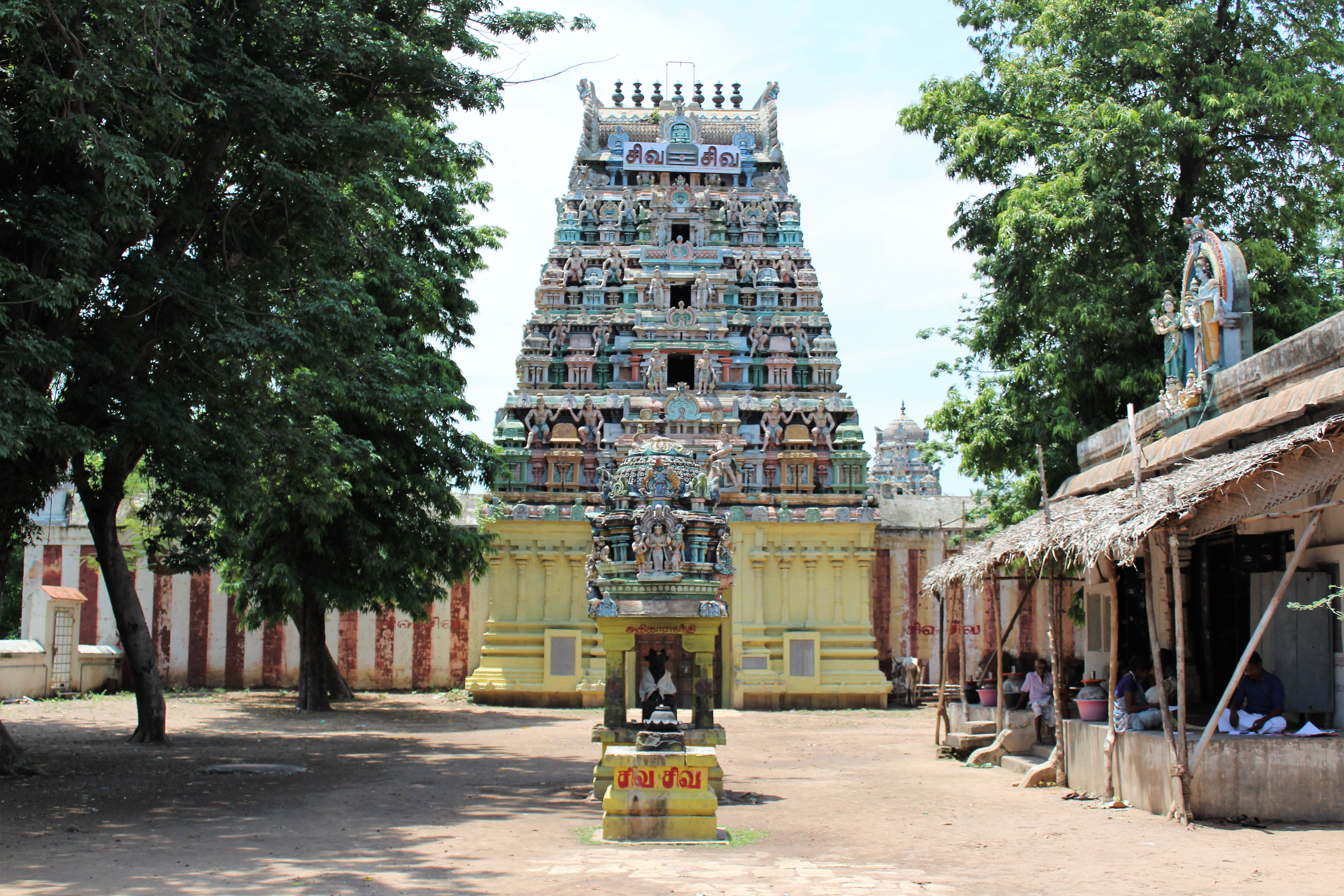

- Location in Tamil Nadu

Religion
- Affiliation: Hinduism
- District: Cuddalore
- Deity: Sudarkozhundeeswarar (Shiva)

Location
- State: Tamil Nadu
- Country: India
- Coordinates: 11°24′09″N 79°15′24″E

Architecture
- Type: Dravidian architecture

The main shrine of the Sudarkozhundeeswarar Temple, Pennadam, dates to the period of the Early Cholas shaped in the form the back of an elephant, called Gajapristhakara. Shiva's vehicle Nandi faces East, away from the shrine. Subsidiary shrine on artificial hill, dedicated to Shiva as Shri Javanteeswarar. The Nandi faces East, with its back turned towards the shrine.

Appar is believed to have visited the temple during the series of visits from Thiruvennainallur, Thirukoilur, Thiruvamathur to this temple.

== Significance ==
It is one of the shrines of the 275 Paadal Petra Sthalams.

== Photogallery ==
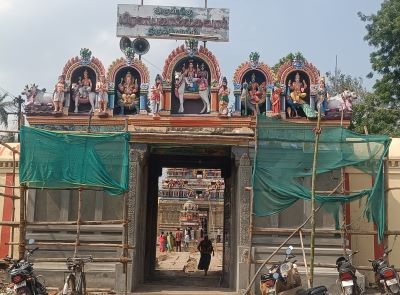
Main entrance

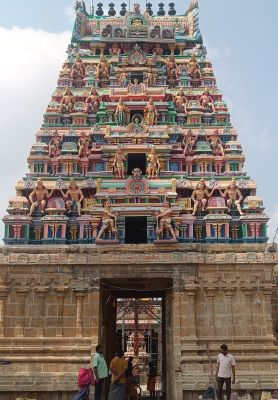
Gopura

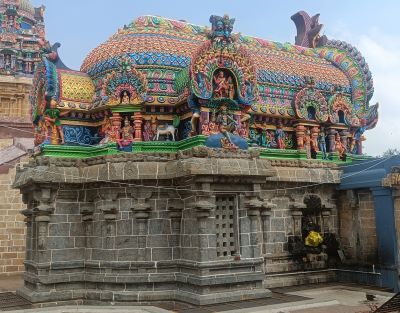
Vimana of Presiding deity

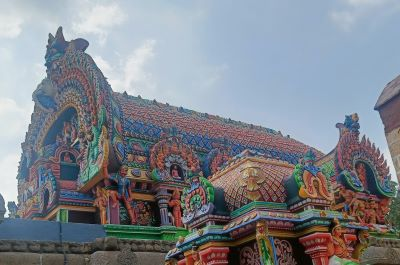
Vimana of Presiding deity (left)

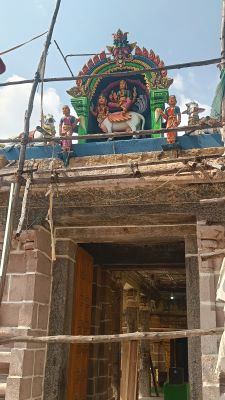
Entrance to the shrine of Amman

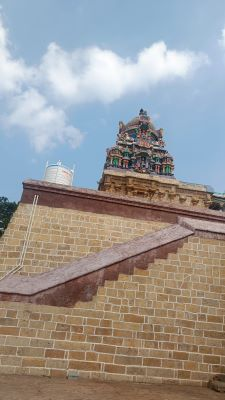
Shrine of Soundaresvarar
