= Kalikamba Nayanar =

Hindu poet-saint

Kalikamba Nayanar, known as Kalikkamba, Kalikamba, Kalikambar, Kaliyamba, Kalikkambar, Kalikkampa(r), Kali Kambanar, Kalikkampa Nayanar and Kaliyamba Nayanar(u), is a Nayanar saint, venerated in the Hindu sect of Shaivism. He is generally counted as the forty-third in the list of 63 Nayanars. His hagiography speaks about how he cut the hand of his wife, who did not help in serving a Shaiva, devotee of the god Shiva.

== Life ==
The primary account of Kalikamba Nayanar's life comes from the Tamil Periya Puranam by Sekkizhar (12th century), which is a hagiography of the 63 Nayanars. Kalikamba Nayanar was born and lived in Pennadam (Pennagadam/Pennakatam/Pennakadam), also known as Tirupennagadam (Thirupennagadam), currently situated 14 kilometres (8.7 mi) near Virudhachalam in the Indian state of Tamil Nadu. It is famous for Sudarkozhundeesar Temple, dedicated to the god Shiva, the patron god of Shaivism. In Kalikamba Nayanar's times, Pennagadam was part of the Chola kingdom. Kalikamba was a Vaishya, the merchant caste that flourished in Pennagadam. He was a devotee of Shiva and used to serve the devotees of Shiva (Shaivas). Every day, he welcomed them, washed their feet, and worshipped them. He also served lunch to the devotees and offered them money and gifts. Once, when the devotees gathered for lunch at Kalikamba's house, he started with his daily ritual of pada-puja (washing of feet to show respect) of the devotees. His wife helped him in the service. The wife would pour water from the pot, as Kalikamba washed the feet. When Kalikamba was about to wash the feet of a devotee, she recognised the devotee as their former servant and hesitated from pouring water from the pot. Kalikamba felt that the wife has desecrated the sacred service. He took the pot from her hand and cut off the hand by his sword. He continued to wash the feet of the devotees and served them food, a duty generally performed by his wife. For his act of devotion, he attained the grace of Shiva.

The tale of Kalikamba Nayanar is also recalled in the 13th-century Telugu Basava Purana of Palkuriki Somanatha with some variation. The devotee is recognized the son of their servant Mallandu or Malla. He had refused to serve Kalikamba and left Kalikamba's house and become a Shaiva mendicant. The wife refuses to serve a son of a slave and advises her husband not to do so, however Kalikamba considers every Shaiva as a manifestation of Shiva and refuses to pour water to wash his feet. Kalikamba considers this as an insult of Shiva and cuts both her hands as a punishment. The account ends by saying that Kalikamba attained moksha (salvation) by the grace of Shiva.

== Remembrance ==
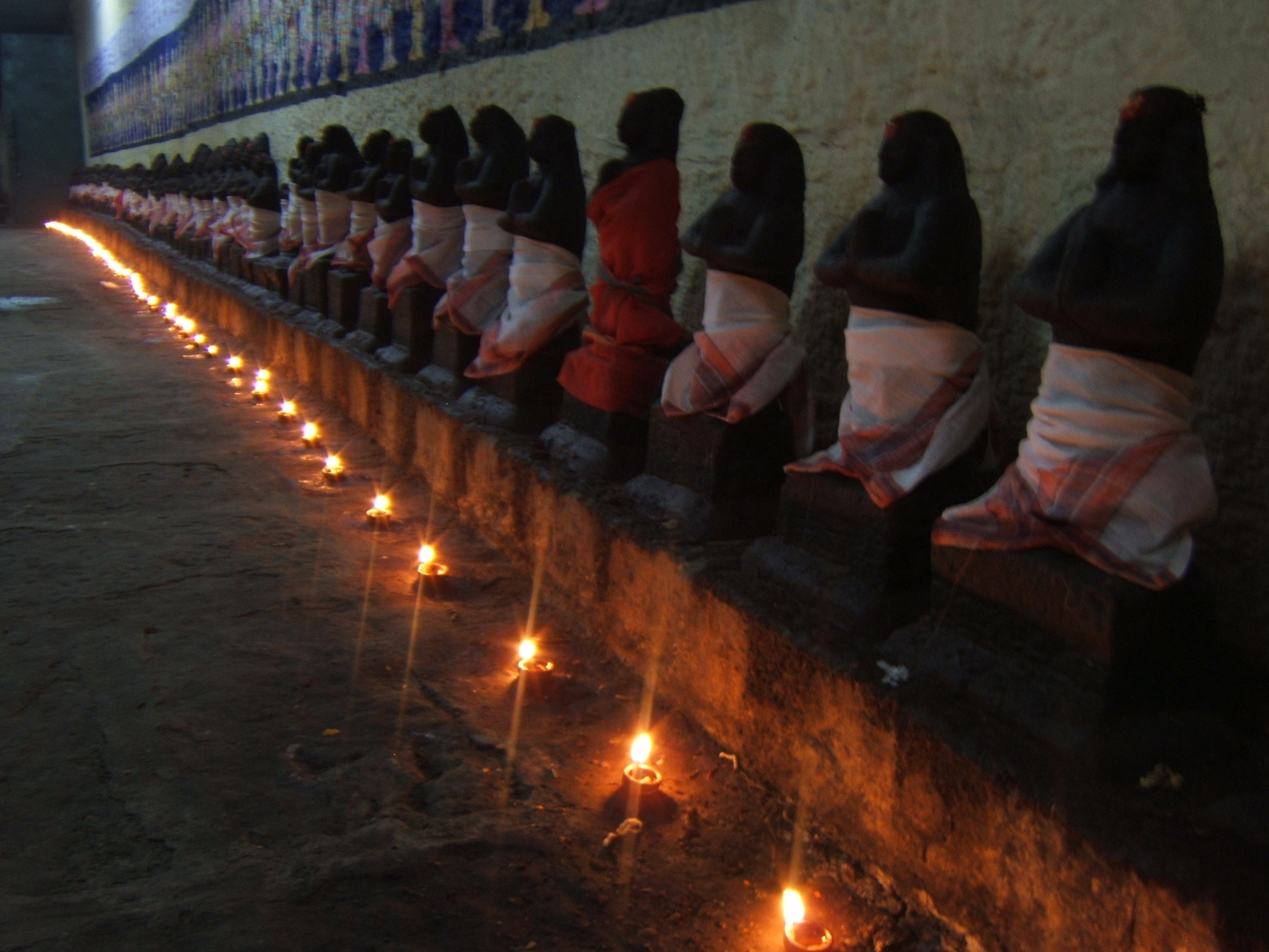
The images of the Nayanars are found in many Shiva temples in Tamil Nadu.

Kalikamba Nayanar receives collective worship as part of the 63 Nayanars. Their icons and brief accounts of his deeds are found in many Shiva temples in Tamil Nadu. Their images are taken out in procession in festivals.
