= Thiruvennainallur =

- Town
- Location in Tamil Nadu, India
- Coordinates: 11°52′45″N 79°22′44″E
- Country: India
- State: Tamil Nadu
- District: Viluppuram

Population (2001)
  - Total: 8,517

Languages
  - Official: Tamil
- Time zone: UTC+5:30 (IST)

Thiruvennainallur is a taluk in Viluppuram district in the Indian state of Tamil Nadu. It is a major sugarcane agricultural region.

== Geography ==
It is about 24 km from Viluppuram and 22 km from Thirukkoilur. Thiruedayaru (T.Edayaru) is a small village 6 km from Thiruvennainallur.

== Demographics ==
As of 2001 India census, Thiruvennainallur had a population of 8517. Males and females each constitute 50% of the population. Thiruvennainallur has an average literacy rate of 68%, higher than the national average of 59.5%: male literacy is 77%, and female literacy is 59%. In Thiruvennainallur, 12% of the population is under 6 years of age.

== Governance ==
The panchayat is divided into two revenue villages and North village administrative office and South village administrative office. The Revenue Inspector office. Thiruvennai nallur new taluka is formed headquarters at thiruvennai nallur 3 Firkas (66 villages) vtz., Thiruvennainallur (30 svillage), Sithilangamadam (12 villages) existing Thirukkoilur taluk and Arasur (24 villages) of the existing Ullundurpettai taluka are attached with villuppuram revenue and Villuppuram district announced on 12.11.2019.

== Culture ==
Kripapureeswarar Temple located here is managed by Hindu Religious and Charitable Endowments Department of Tamil Nadu Government. (one of the oldest shiva temple)

== Notable people ==
The Tamil poet Vennaivelan belongs to Thiruvennainallur. The writer of Siva Gnana Bodham, Meykanda Nayanar (earlier name: Suvethana Perumal), was born in Thirupennākadam.
