= Pennadam =

Pennadam Pen Aavu Kadam
- Town
- Nickname: PNDM
- Location in Tamil Nadu, India
- Coordinates: 11.4°N 79.23°E
- Country: India
- State: Tamil Nadu
- District: Cuddalore
- Elevation: 54 m (177 ft)

Population (2011)
  - Total: 19,494

Languages
  - Official: Tamil
- Time zone: UTC+5:30 (IST)

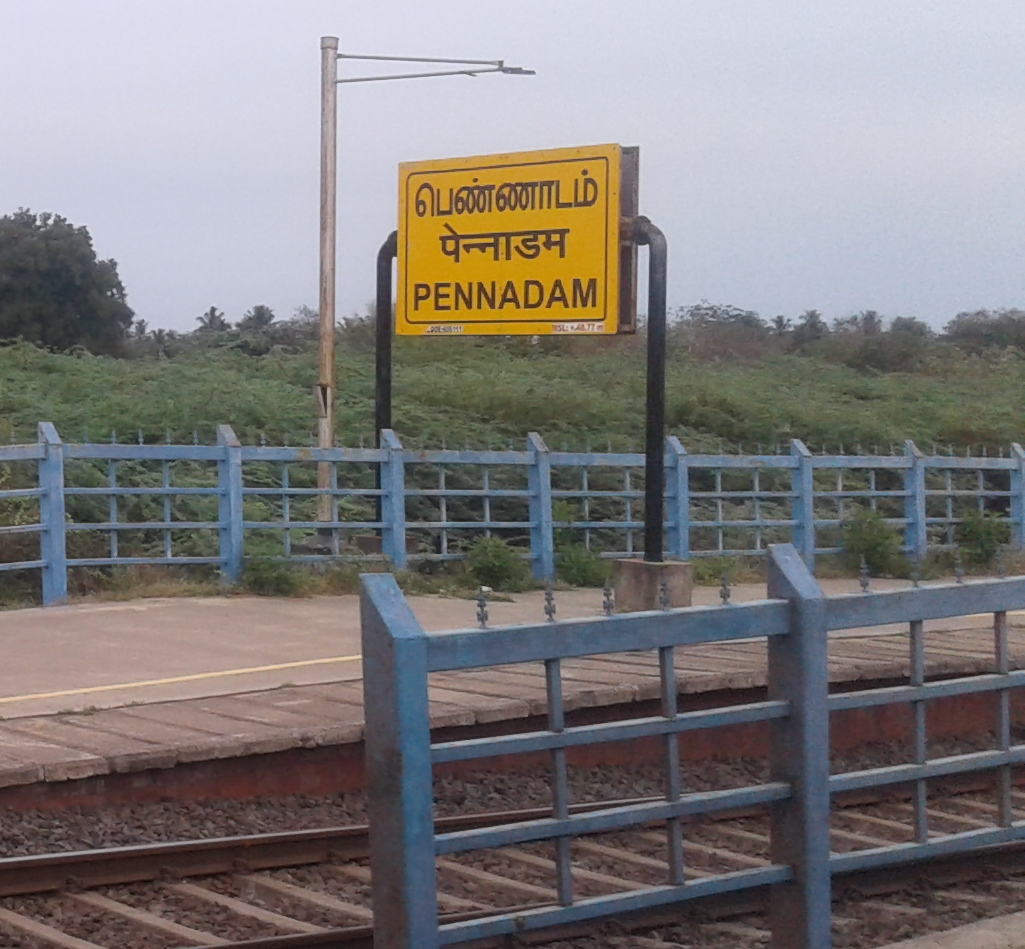
Pennadam Railway Station

Pennadam (Pen Aavu Kadam) is a panchayat town in Cuddalore district in the Indian state of Tamil Nadu.

== Geography ==
Pennadam has an average elevation of 54 metres (177 feet).

== History ==
Sudarkozhundeeswarar Temple was built in the early Chola period. Pennadam is also the birthplace of Meykandar and Kalikamba Nayanar renowned Nayanmars in Shaivaite culture. A temple was also built for Meykandar in this town in the 20th century.

== Demographics ==
As of 2001 India census, Pennadam had a population of 17,142. Males constitute 51% of the population and females 49%. Pennadam has an average literacy rate of 65%, higher than the national average of 59.5%: male literacy is 73%, and female literacy is 56%. In Pennadam, 11% of the population is under 6 years of age.
