= Pashupati (disambiguation) =

Pashupati is a Hindu deity, a form of Shiva.

Pashupati (and variants) may also refer to:

== People ==
- Pasupathy (born 1969), an Indian actor in Tamil cinema
- Pasupati Bose, an Indian physician
- Pashupati Kumar Paras (born 1952), an Indian politician
- Pashupati Mandal, an Indian politician
- Pashupati Nath Singh (born 1949), an Indian politician
- Pasupathy Pandian (1960–2012), an Indian politician from Tamil Nadu
- Pashupati Paneru (born 1982), a Nepalese badminton player
- Pashupati Sharma (born 1982), a Nepalese folk singer
- Pashupati Shumsher Jung Bahadur Rana (born 1941), a Nepalese politician
- Kaajal Pasupathi, an Indian actress in Tamil cinema
- Rudra Pasupathi Nayanar, a 16th-century Indian Shaivite saint
- Shiva Pasupati, Sri Lankan Tamil lawyer
- Subbarayan Pasupathy (1940–2023), an Indian-Canadian electrical engineer and academic

== Other ==
- Pashupati seal, Indus Valley Civilization soapstone seal discovered at Mohenjo-daro; so named due to its identification with Pashupati or Shiva
- Pashupati Purana, One of the 18 Aupapuranas.
- Pasupati Bridge, West Java, Indonesia
- Dr. Pasupathy, a 1990 Indian Malayalam-language comedy drama film by Shaji Kailas
- Pasupathi c/o Rasakkapalayam, a 2007 Indian film
- Pashupati Prasad, a 2016 Nepalese film and its titular character
  - Pashupati Prasad 2: Bhasme Don, a 2023 Nepalese film, sequel to Pashupati Prasad
- Pasupathikoil, a neighbourhood in Thanjavur district, Tamil Nadu, India
- Pasupathihal, a village in Karnataka, India

== See also ==
- Pashupatinath (disambiguation)
- Pashupatinagar (disambiguation)
- Pashu (disambiguation)
- Pati (disambiguation)
- Pashupati Area Development Trust, a Nepali Hindu trust
- Pashupati Aryaghat, a temple in Bagmati Province, Nepal
- Pasupatiswarar Temple, Thanjavur district, Tamil Nadu, India
- Pasupatheeswarar Temple, Aavoor, Tamil Nadu, India
- Pasupatheesvarar Temple, Nallavur, Tamil Nadu, India
- Pasupatheesvarar Temple, Pasupathikovil, Tamil Nadu, India
- Pasupatheesvarar Temple, Thinnakkonam, Tamil Nadu, India
