= Pashupatinath =

Pashupatinath may refer to:

- Pashupatinath or Pashupati, Hindu god, a form of Shiva
  - Pashupatinath Temple, Kathmandu, a temple in Nepal
  - Pashupatinath Temple, Mandsaur, temple in India
    - Pashupatinath Temple shooting, 1983

== See also ==
- Pashupati (disambiguation)
- Pashu (disambiguation)
- Pati (disambiguation)
- Nath (disambiguation)
