= Pashupatinagar =

Pashupatinagar (lit. 'city of Pashupati/Shiva') may refer to:

- Varanasi or Kashi, an ancient holy city in India, the abode of the Hindu deity Shiva
- Pashupatinagar, Janakpur, Nepal
- Pashupatinagar, Mechi, Nepal

== See also ==
- Pashupati (disambiguation)
