= Aupapurana =

Category of Puranas

The Aupapurana (Sanskrit: औपपुराण) refers to one of the three major categories of Puranas in the tradition of Hinduism in the Indian subcontinent. The other two major categories of Puranas are Mahapurana and Upapurana. The number of Aupapuranas are 18. These 18 Aupapuranas are composed in the Sanskrit literature and considered as religious texts of Hinduism. Among the 18 Aupapuranas, the Brihannarada and Harivansha Puranas are most popular. The Hindu scholar Pandit Madhavacharya Shastri has mentioned three categories of Puranas. They are Purana, Upapurana, and Aupapurana.

== List of Aupapuranas ==
The list of Puranas:

1. Brihaddhamma Purana
2. Vishnudhamattir Purana
3. Harivansha Purana
4. Vamana Purana
5. Aditya Purana
6. Brahmad Purana
7. Mahabhagavata (Shakta) Purana
8. Vashishtha Purana
9. Kaurma Purana
10. Ganesha Purana
11. Bhargava Purana
12. Sanatkumara Purana
13. Mudgal Purana
14. Parananda Purana
15. Maheshwara Purana
16. Pashupati Purana
17. Kumara Krita Skanda Purana
18. Narad Purana
