= Pashu =

Pashu may refer to:

== Things ==
- Pashu language, a Malay-based creole patois spoken in Kawthaung, Myanmar (Burma).
- Pterocarpus indicus, a tree and its wood also known as Pashu padauk or Malay padauk.
- Kiasu, a Singlish and Manglish concept referring to niggardly, rude or ungrateful behavior driven by competitive pressure.

== Places ==
- Pashu, Iran, a village in Kermān Province, Iran (Latitude: 28° 44' 2 N, Longitude: 58° 58' 7 E)
- Pashu, Peru, a village in Piura Province, Peru (Latitude: 5° 40' 10 S, Longitude: 79° 32' 34 W)
- Pashu, Zimbabwe, a town in Zimbabwe (Latitude: 18° 13' 0 S, Longitude: 27° 24' E)
- Pashu Rock, a landmark on the coast of Liberia (Latitude: 4° 37' N, Longitude: 8° 20' W)
- Pashu Island, a small island in the Marine National Park, Gulf of Kutch, Gujarat, India
- Mergui Archipelago, sometimes known as the Pashu Islands

== People ==
- Pashu, a Burmese word for the Kedahan Malays/Burmese Malays living in southern Myanmar

== See also ==
- Govind Pashu Vihar, a wildlife sanctuary in Uttarkashi, Uttarakhand, India
- Pashupati (disambiguation), an epithet of the Hindu deity Shiva
