= Pasupathy Pandian =

Indian politician (1960–2012)

C.Pasupathy Pandian
- Born: 13 April 1960; Alangarathattu, Thoothukudi, Tamil Nadu, India
- Died: 10 January 2012 (aged 51); Dindigul, Tamil Nadu, India
- Occupation: Politician
- Height: 5 ft 6 in (168 cm)
- Spouse: Jessintha pandian

C. Pasupathy Pandian (13 April 1960 – 10 January 2012) was an Indian politician who was the leader of the Devendra Kula Vellalar Kootamaipu, a caste-based outlet in Tamil Nadu. His political career and death attracted widespread attention in the southern parts of the state.

== Early life ==
Pandian was born on 13 April 1960 in Alangarathattu, a village near Thoothukudi.

== Career ==
Pandian was a member of the Pattali Makkal Katchi political party of the Tamil Nadu, before creating a party of his own. He had issues with Subramania nadar family for landrelated issues.

He was murdered on 10 January 2012. He was hacked to death by a gang at his residence in Nandhavanathupatti near Dindigul. Special teams were constituted to find his assailants. The police took many persons for questioning including Pandian's bodyguards, who were with him at the time of the murder. Arulanandham hails from Mullakadu, which is near Moolakarai, the native place of 'Venkatesa Pannaiyar'. Two men surrendered in the Valliyoor court in connection with the murder. Venkatesh Pannayar was an industrialist. Police are investigating if Pandian's murder was committed in retaliation for the murders in Pannaiyar's group, including Sivasubramaniya Nadar, grandfather of Subash Pannaiyar (cousin of Pannaiyar), who was murdered in 1990, with Pandian named as an accused. Police questioned several persons, including Pandian's bodyguards, who were with him shortly before the attack.

Although the southern districts remained calm on Thursday, police pickets were deployed at sensitive locations in Ramanathapuram district, including Paramakudi, Kadaladi and Kamuthi. Patrolling was also intensified in these areas.
