= Pashupati Purana =

One of the eighteen Aupapuranas of Hinduism

- पशुपति पुराण
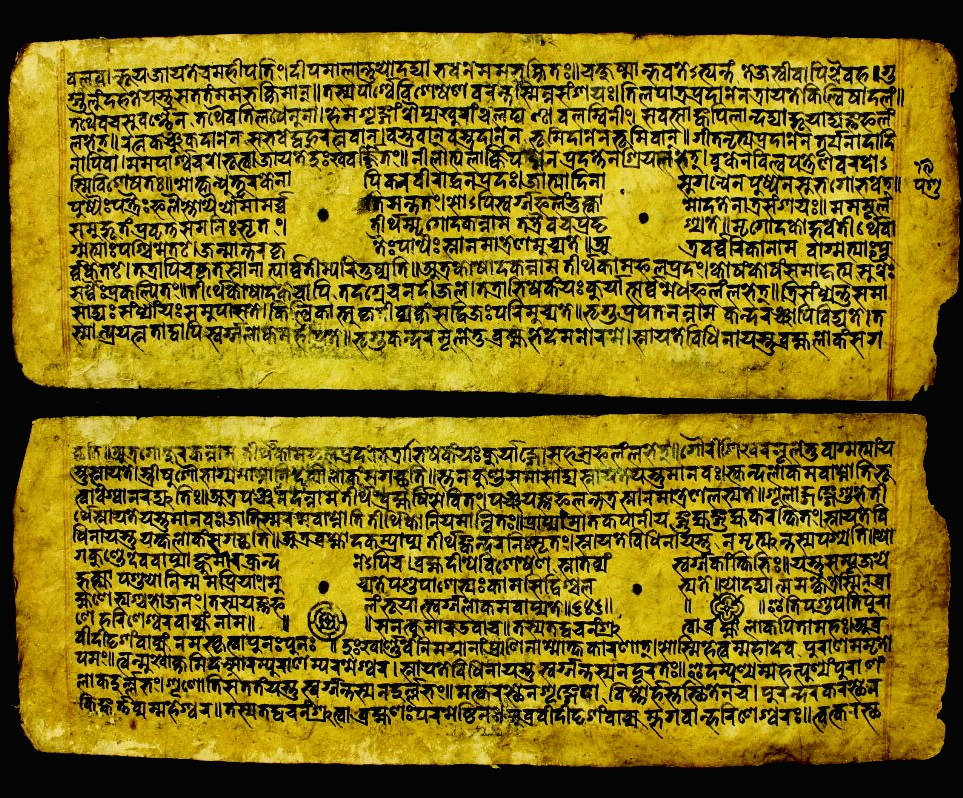
- Manuscript of Pashupati Purana written in the Newar script.

Information
- Religion: Hinduism
- Language: Sanskrit
- Chapters: 22
- Verses: 743
- Aupapurana
- A text of Purana in Hinduism.

Pashupati Purana (Sanskrit: पशुपति पुराण, Romanised: Pāśupati Purāṇa) is a sacred Sanskrit text related to the Śaiva tradition in the Nepal Mandala of the Indian subcontinent. It is one of the 54 Puranas in the tradition of Hinduism. It belongs to the category of the 18 Aupapuranas. In this Purana, Lord Shiva is praised as Pashupati - "Lord of all beings". It also describes the legends of the world famous Pashupatinath Mandir situated in the valley of Kathmandu in Nepal. In the text, there is a separate section called Nepal Mahatmya that describes the origin of the Himalayan region Nepal. The revered Rishi Sanata Kumara describes the origin of the term 'Nepal' in the text.

== Dating ==
According to Levi and K P Malla, the oldest extant manuscript of the Pashupati Purana dates back to the Nepal Samvat 624, that is, 1504 AD.

Similarly, several original folios of an old manuscript of the Pashupati Purana in Newar script are preserved at Tokha in Nepal. The manuscript dates back to the Nepal Samvat 829, that is 1709 AD. This 18th century CE manuscript is digitally available at the British Library website.

Jessica Vantine Birkenholtz places the text Pashupati Purana among the three locally produced Puranas in Nepal. The other two texts are Nepal Mahatmya and Himavatkhanda. The Pashupati Purana is the oldest text among the three locally produced Puranas texts.

== Translations ==
The Nepalese scholar cum professor Madhusudan Risal 'Pradop' translated the text into Nepali language. The translated version of the text Pashupati Purana was published in the year Bikram Samvat 2026 by the Nepal Rajkiya Pragya Pratishthan.

== Contents ==
This Purana is based on the Pashupati Avatar of Lord Shiva and the origin of his popular shrine Pashupatinath Mandir in the valley of Kathmandu in Nepal. It gives a legendary description for the origin of the term Nepāla. According to the text, the term Nepāla is derived from the name of a legendary rishi, whose name starts with the Indic letter Ne. In the text, some verses of the chapters 17 and 18, provide information regarding the Lichchhavis defeating the Kirata dynasty of the valley.

The first folio of the preserved text Pashupati Purana, starts with a salutations mantra known as Panchakshara Mantra dedicated to Lord Shiva. The Panchakshara Mantra is

ॐ नमः शिवाय ।

— First Verse, Pashupati Purana

The text of Pashupati Purana is divided into twenty two chapters. Each chapter contains several number of Shlokas. The total number of Shlokas in these chapters are 743. The first chapter contains 60 Shlokas. Similarly the second chapter holds 40 shlokas. The second Shloka of the first chapter says that the Katha of the Pashupati Purana was told by the revered sage Pulastya to Bhishma.

Further the conversations between the revered sage Pulastya and the prince Bhishma in the text, are narrated by Sūta to an assembly of sages. According to the third Shloka of the first chapter, the contents of the Pashupati Purana are taken from the literary works of the revered sage Veda Vyasa. In the Shloka, the revered sage Vedas Vyasa is acknowledged and respectfully saluted for his literary works being the source of the contents in the Pashupati Purana, by the author of the text.

== Khanda (section) ==
There are several Khandas (sections) in the text. The major Khandas are Vagvati Prashansa-Khanda, Tirthayatra Khanda, and Pradhyumn Vijay-Khanda, etc.

=== Vagvati Prashansa-Khanda ===
Vagvati Prashansa-Khanda refers to the section of the Pashupati Purana dedicated in the praise to the legendary river Bagmati. In the text, the legendary river is mentioned as Vagvati. According to the first Shloka, the source of the legendary river Vagvati is mentioned as the Kamalmukh (lotus type mouth) of Lord Shiva. In Shloka, Lord Shiva is addressed by his names Shankara and Bhubaneswaram.

=== Tirthayatra Khanda ===
The Tirthayatra Khanda gives the description of the tirthas originated from the holy rivers of Ganga and Vagvati, etc in the subcontinent.

== Stuti ==
In the text, after the end of the 22nd chapter, three stuti paathas are added dedicated to the Tirthas described in text, holy Bagmati Devi and Lord Pashupati.
