= Pashupatinath Temple =

Hindu temple in Kathmandu

Pashupatinātha Temple
- श्री पशुपतिनाथ मन्दिर
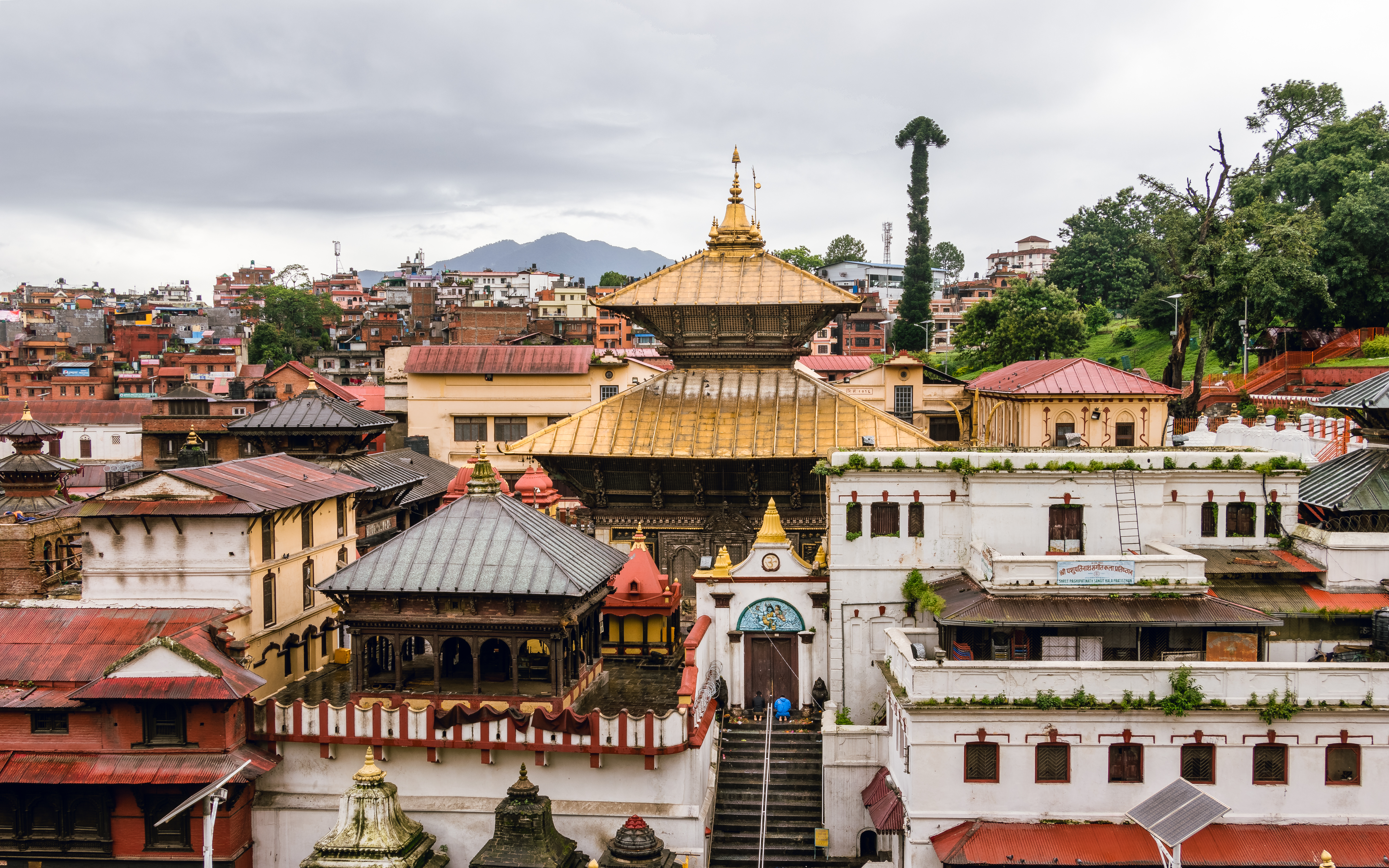
- Pashupatinātha Temple, associated with Shiva as 'the lord of all beings'

- Location in Nepal

Religion
- Affiliation: Hinduism
- District: Kathmandu
- Province: Bagmati Province
- Deity: Pashupati, a form of Shiva
- Festivals: Mahashivaratri, Teej
- Features: Temple tank: Bagmati River; Temple tree: Ancient banyan tree

Location
- Location: Kathmandu
- Country: Nepal
- Interactive map of Pashupatinātha Temple
- Coordinates: 27°42′35″N 85°20′55″E

Architecture
- Type: Pagoda
- Established: 5th century CE

Specifications
- Site area: 2,460,000 m^{2} (26,500,000 sq ft)
- Temple: 519 pagodas
- Elevation: 817 m (2,680 ft)

UNESCO World Heritage Site
- Criteria: Cultural: (iii)(iv)(vi)
- Designated: 1979 (3rd session)
- Part of: Kathmandu Valley
- Reference no.: 121bis-006

Protected Ancient Monument
- Law: Ancient Monuments Preservation Act, 2013 (1956)
- ID: NP-KMC08-01

Pashupatinath Temple (Nepali: श्री पशुपतिनाथ मन्दिर, romanized: Śrī Paśupatinātha Mandira) is a Hindu temple dedicated to Pashupati, considered a manifestation of Shiva. Located on the banks of the sacred Bagmati River in Kathmandu, Nepal, the temple is one of the oldest and most significant religious complexes in South Asia. Recognized as a UNESCO World Heritage Site since 1979, it is one of seven monument groups in UNESCO's designation of Kathmandu Valley and is described as an "extensive Hindu temple precinct" comprising a vast network of temples, ashrams, inscriptions, and images raised over the centuries along the banks of the sacred Bagmati River. The temple, considered one of the holiest pilgrimage sites for Hindus, is built on an area of 246 hectares (2,460,000 m^{2}) and includes 518 mini-temples and the principal pagoda-style temple.

Pashupatinath temple is venerated as one of the holiest abodes of Shiva in Skanda Purana and is honored as one of the Paadal Petra Sthalams (Tevara Sthalam) of the Tevaram, a canon of the Shaiva Siddhanta tradition which eulogise holy sanctuaries. There is also a separate minor Purana text known as Pashupati Purana, dedicated to the legends of the holy shrine of Pashupatinath. The linga of Pashupatinath, as per Shiva Purana, is believed to be the bestower of all wishes. Mythologically, the temple is seen as the head of Shiva with his body stretching to the Kashi Vishwanath Temple in India, and is also spiritually connected to the temples of Kedarnath, Rudranath, Kalpeshwar, Madhyamaheshwar and Tungnath as per the legend of Mahabharata.

== History ==
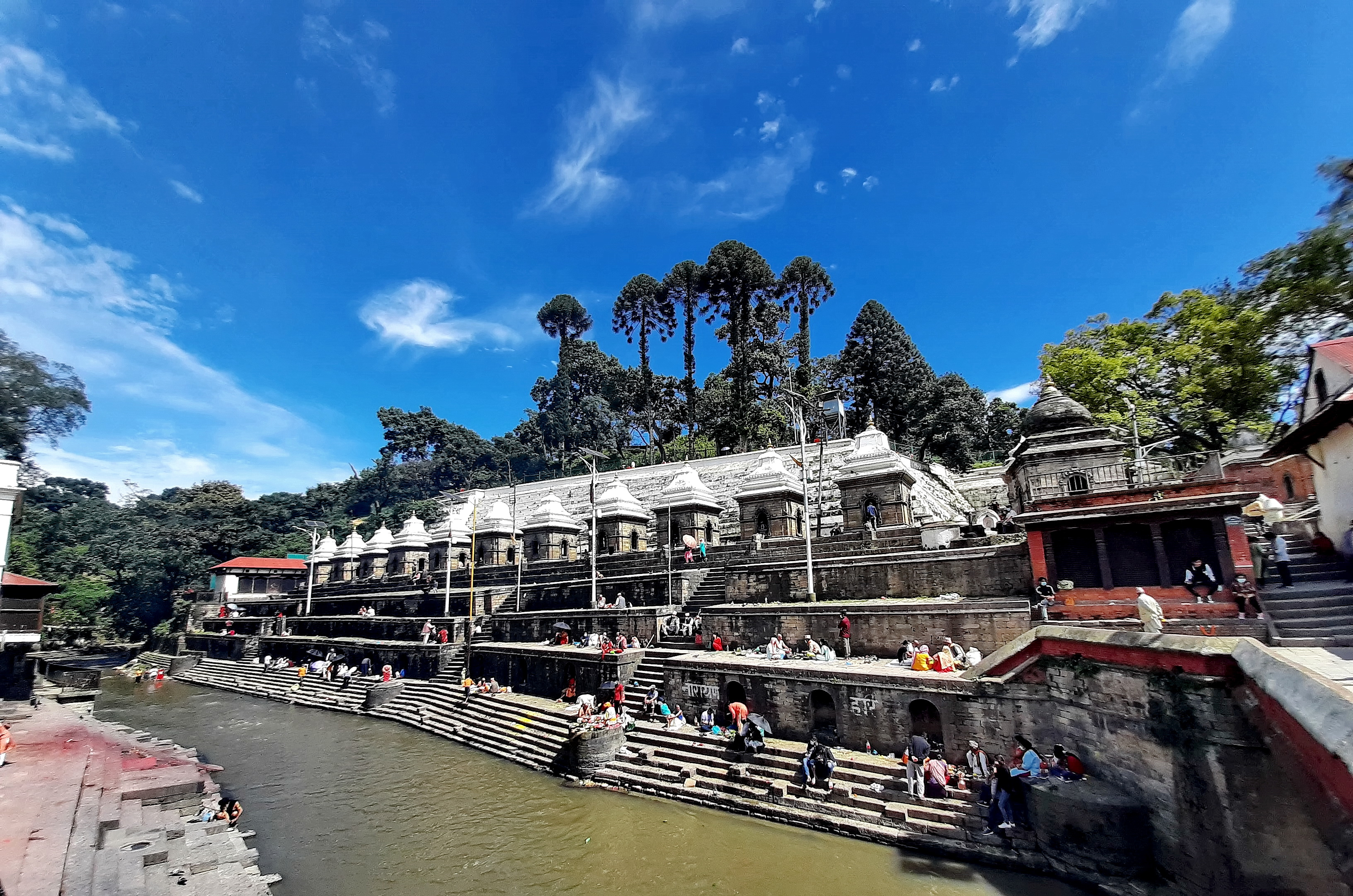
15 Shivalayas and viewpoint for visitors overlooking the temple area

Pashupatinath Temple is the oldest Hindu temple in Kathmandu. The temple is considered to be pre-vedic in its origin and according to Nepal Mahatmaya and Himvatkhanda of Skanda Purana, the deity here gained great fame as Pashupati.

As per Shiva Purana, the linga of Pashupatinath that lies in Nepal has the capacity to fulfill all desires, and the story of Pashupatinath is narrated along with the greatness of Kedareshwara (Kedarnath) in the 9th chapter of "Koti-Rudra Samhita" which describes the journey of Pandavas in the search of Shiva. After Pandavas perform much penance, Shiva who had hidden himself underground in the form of a bull, reappears with his head in Pashupatinath, hump in Kedarnath, face in Rudranath, arms in Tungnath and navel in Madhyamaheshwar.

Pashupatinath Temple's existence is recorded as early as 400 CE. The ornamented pagoda houses the linga of Shiva. According to Gopal Raj Vamshavali, the temple was built by Prachanda Deva, a Licchavi king. Another chronicle states that Pashupatinath Temple was in the form of Linga shaped Devalaya before Supuspa Deva constructed a five-storey temple of Pashupatinath in this place. As time passed, the temple needed to be repaired and renovated. It is known that this temple was reconstructed by a medieval king named Shivadeva (1099–1126 CE). It was renovated by Ananta Malla adding a roof to it. Further temples have been erected around the two-storied temple, including the Vaishnava temple complex with a Rama temple from the 14th century and the Guhyeshwari Temple mentioned in an 11th-century manuscript, overtime. The current form of the temple was renovated in 1692 CE after the previous structures were affected by termites and earthquakes.

== Architecture ==
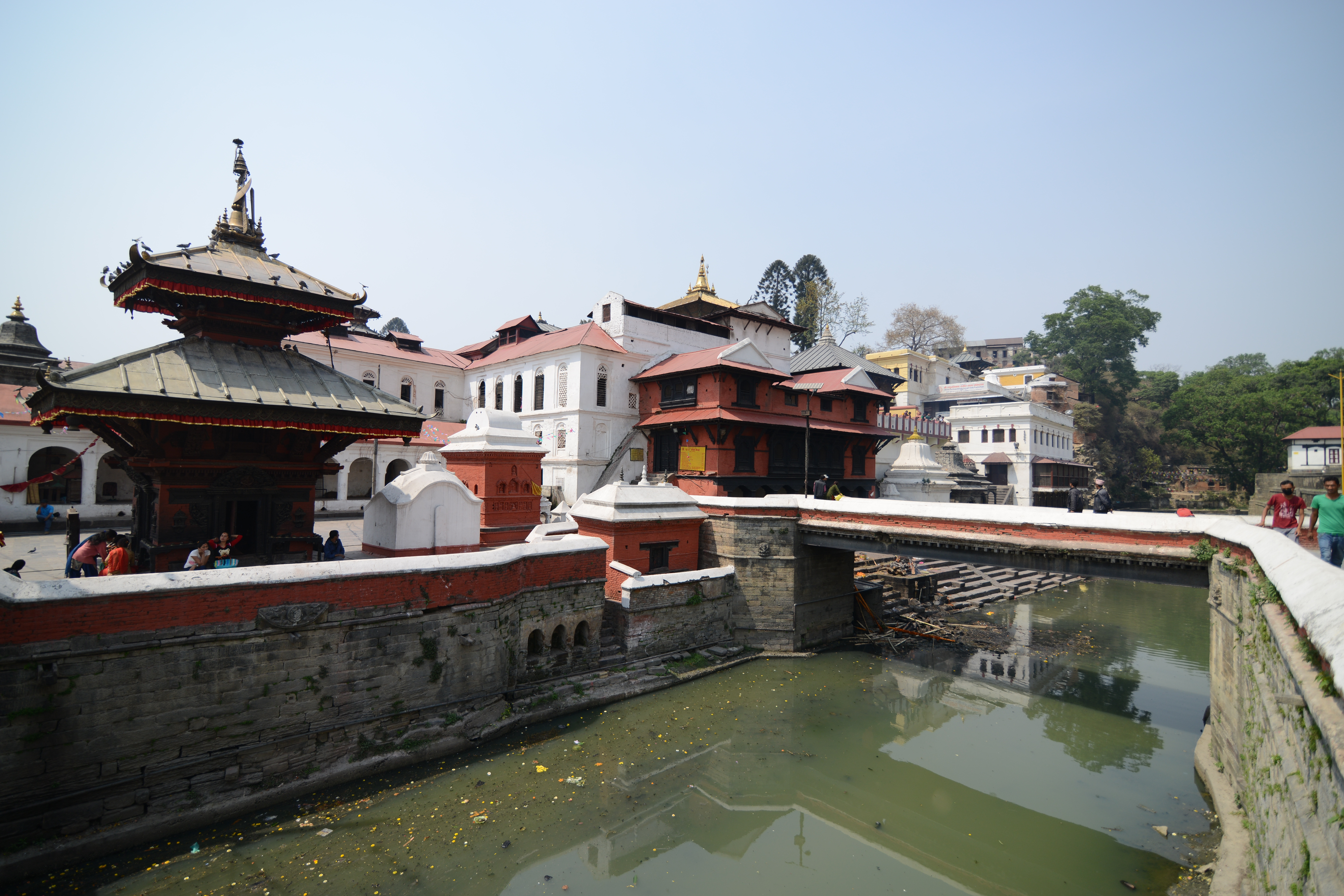
Temple structures along river bank

This main temple is built in Newari architecture(pagoda-style). The two-level roofs are of copper with gold covering. The temple rests on a square base platform with a height of 23m 7 cm from base to pinnacle. It has four main doors, all covered with silver sheets. This temple has a gold pinnacle (peak). Inside are two garbhagrihas: the inner garbhagriha or sanctum sanctorum is where the idol is placed, and the outer sanctum is an open corridor-like space.

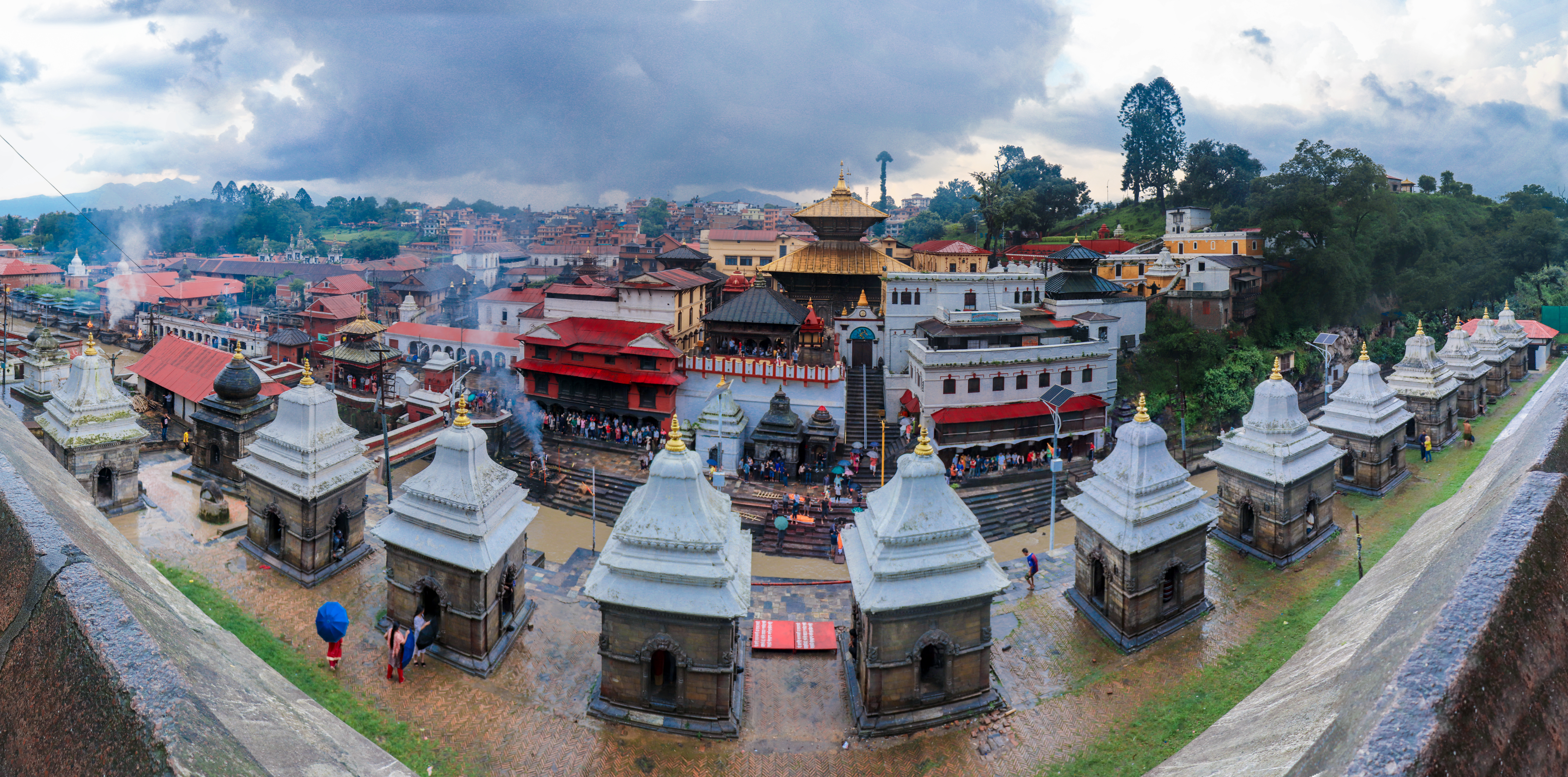
Panorama of Pashupatinath temple featuring the main temple's eastern gate, mini-temples and cremation spots along Bagmati river

== Deity ==
The sacro sanctum, or the main idol, is a stone Mukhalinga with a silver snānadroṇī base bound with a silver serpent. It is one metre high and has faces in four directions, which represent various aspects of Shiva; Sadyojata (also known as Barun), Vamadeva (also known as Ardhanareshwara), Tatpurusha, Aghora, and Ishana (imaginative).

== Priests ==
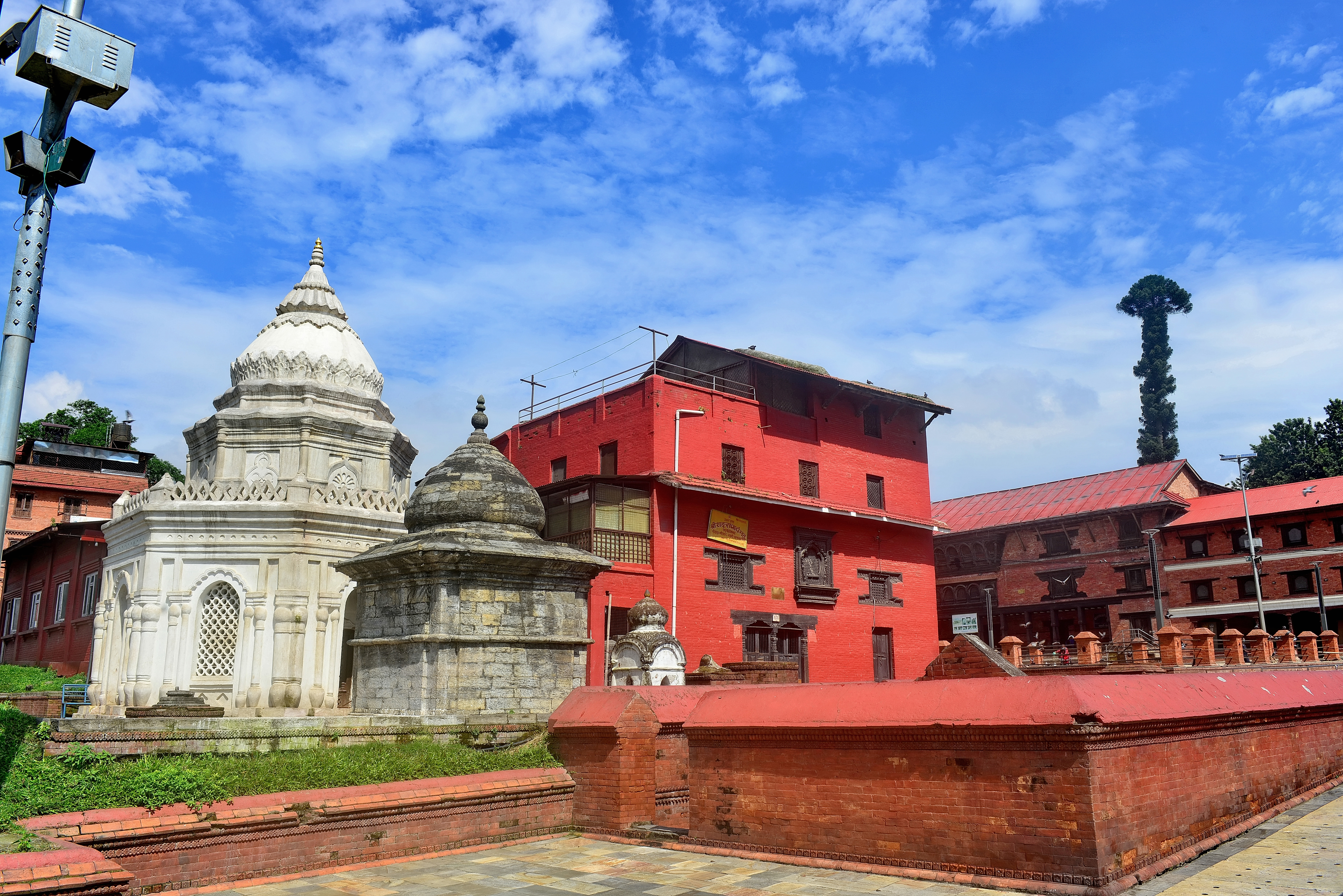
Adi Shankaracharya math within temple complex. Adi Shankara was an 8th century Vedic scholar from Kerala, India

Only four priests can touch the idol. Daily rituals of Pashupatinath are carried out by two groups of priests: the Bhatta and the Rajbhandari. Bhatta perform the daily ritual and can touch the lingam, whereas Rajbhandaris are helpers and temple caretakers who are not qualified to perform puja rituals or to touch the Deity.

=== Rajbhandaris ===
The Rajbhandaris are the treasurers, temple caretakers, and assistant priests of the temple. They are the descendants of helper priests brought up by early Bhatts, but were allowed to settle in Kathmandu Valley and later assimilated into the existing Newar caste system of Rajbhandari – a high-caste Chathariya/Kshatriya clan of Kashyapa gotra. Their main task is to help the Bhatt priests and perform maintenance of the inner garbhagriha. They can have little or no Vedic knowledge but still qualify as assistant priests if they belong from the same family lineage and undergo some basic criteria like caste, gotra, lineage purity, and educational qualification. They work in a set of three and switch every full moon day. There are a total of 108 Rajbhandaris.

== Festivals ==
There are many festivals throughout the year, such as the Maha Shivaratri and the Teej festival. Teej is one of the most celebrated festival at Pashupatinath Temple.

== Buddhist pilgrimage ==
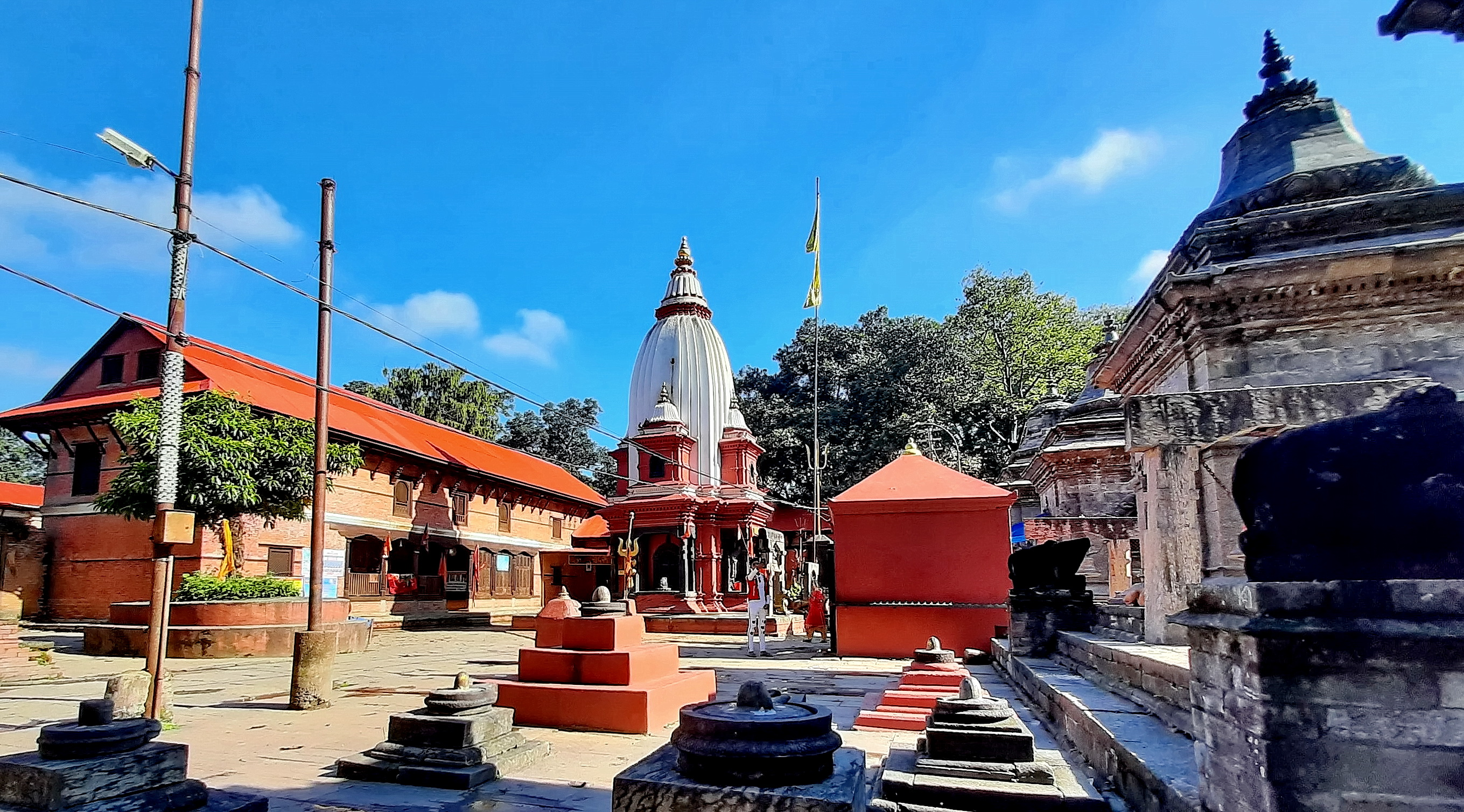
Gorakhnath Temple in Pashupati Kshetra. Gorakhnath was the disciple of Matsyendranath who is believed to have received teachings of Yoga from Shiva

Buddhists consider the temple complex as sacred, and is associated with numerous mahasiddhas such as Matsyendranath, Gorakhnath, Padmasambhava, Naropa and Tilopa. The temple area is believed to be the place where Gorakhnath opened up the practices of haṭha yoga to people from all walks of life. In Vajrayana Buddhism, the cremation zone of the temple complex falls under 'Lhundrup Tsek' or Spontaneous Mound charnel ground and is revered among the eight great charnel grounds where Padmasambhava (also known as Guru Rinpoche in Tibetan) meditated and gained spiritual accomplishments.

== Controversy ==
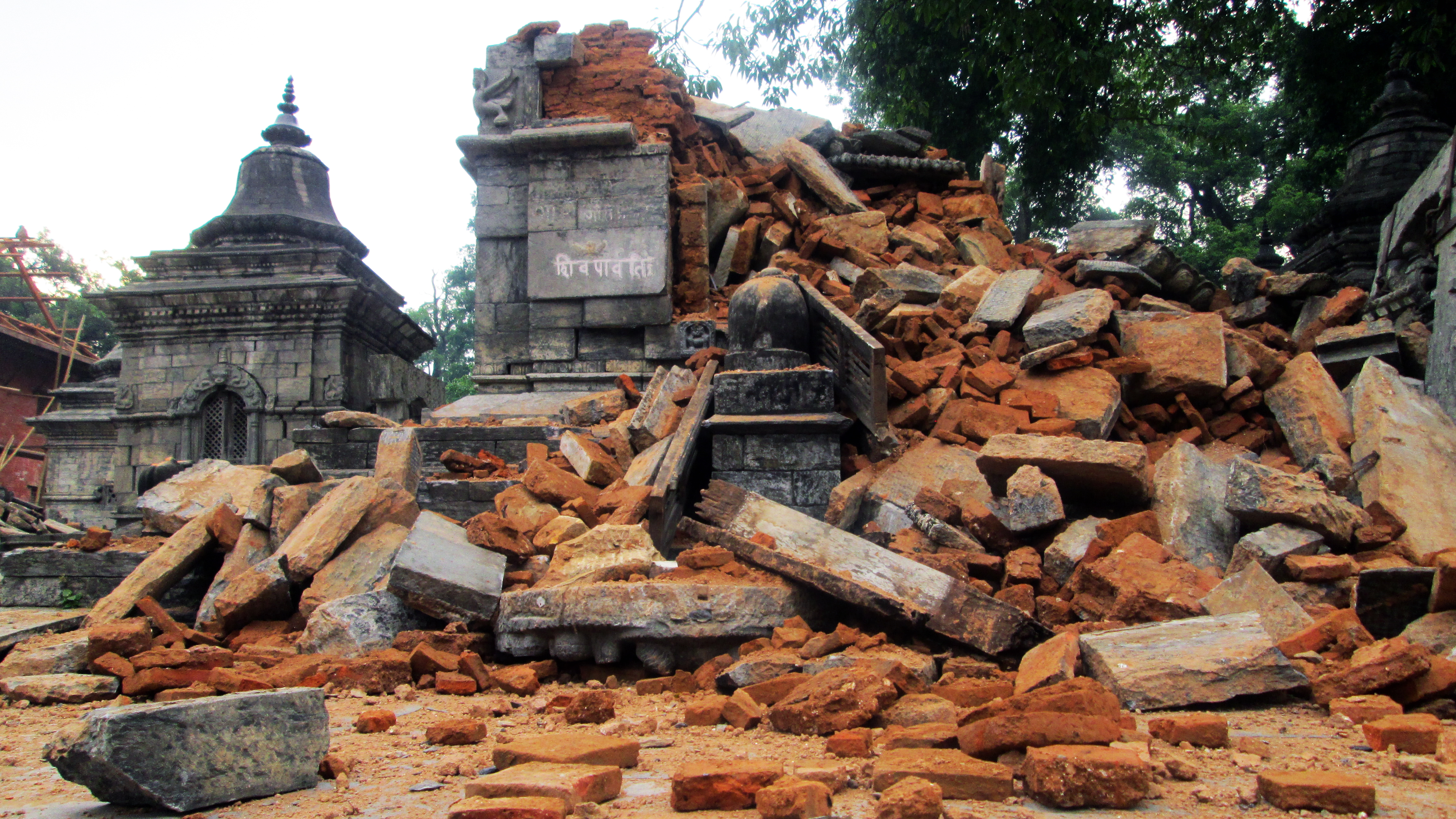
One of the outer shrines damaged in 2015 Nepal earthquake.

In January 2009, after the forced resignation by the chief priest of Pashupatinath temple, the Maoist-led government of Nepal "hand picked" Nepalese priests of Khas-Gorkhali ethnicity to lead the temple, bypassing the temple's long-standing requirements. This appointment was contested by the Rajbhandaris (temple caretakers) of the temple, stating that they were not against the appointment of Nepalese priests but against the appointment without proper procedure. After the appointment was challenged in a civil court, the appointment was overruled by the Supreme Court of Nepal, but the government ignored the ruling and stood by its decision, which led to public outrage and protests over a lack of transparency. A clash between the youth wing of the Communist Party of Nepal (Maoist) and the protesting temple staff caused over a dozen injuries when some 100 Maoist cadres attacked the temple caretakers, though the maoists denied the attack. Lawmakers and activists from opposition parties joined protests, declaring their support for the Bhatt and other pro-Bhatt protesters.

== Gallery ==
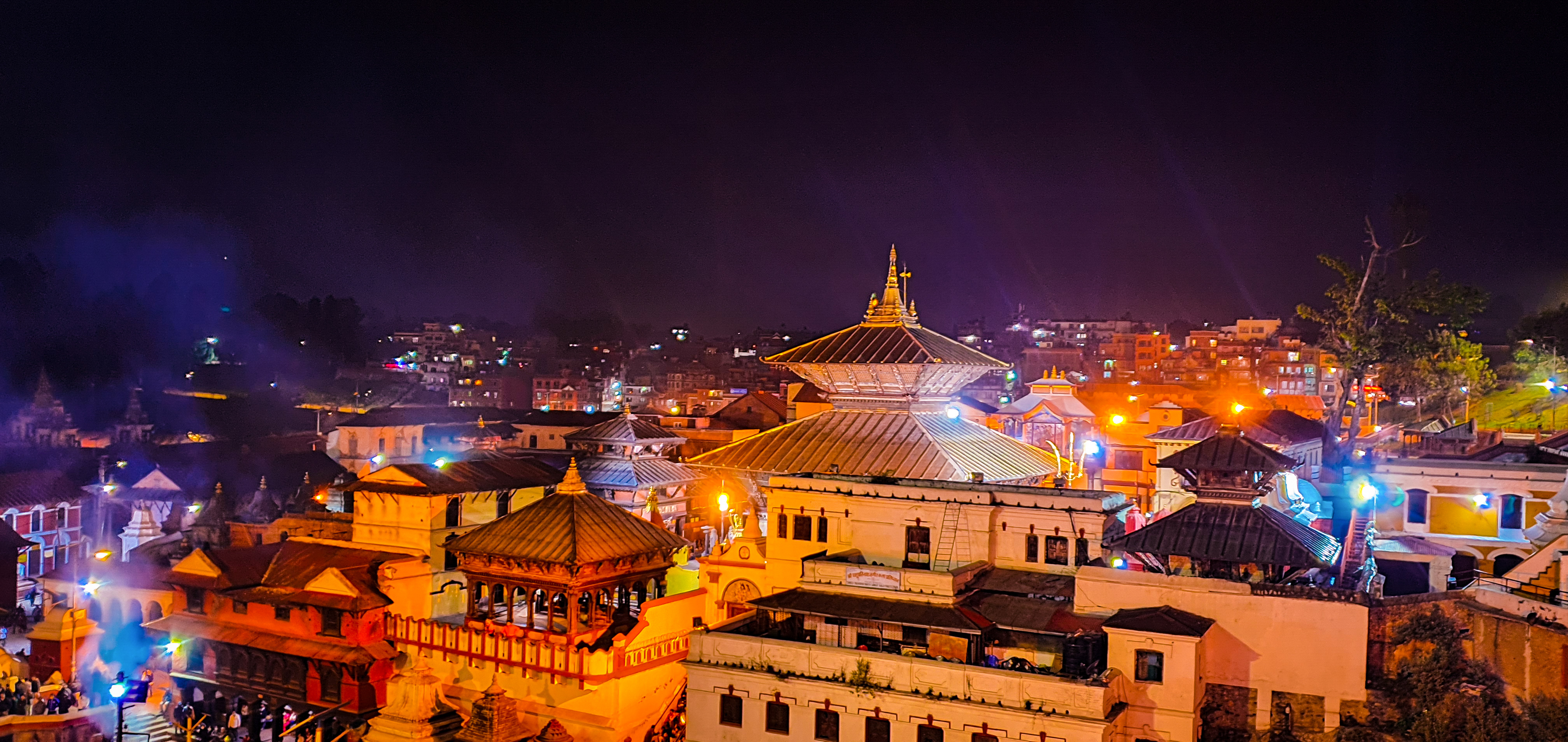
Pashupatinath at night

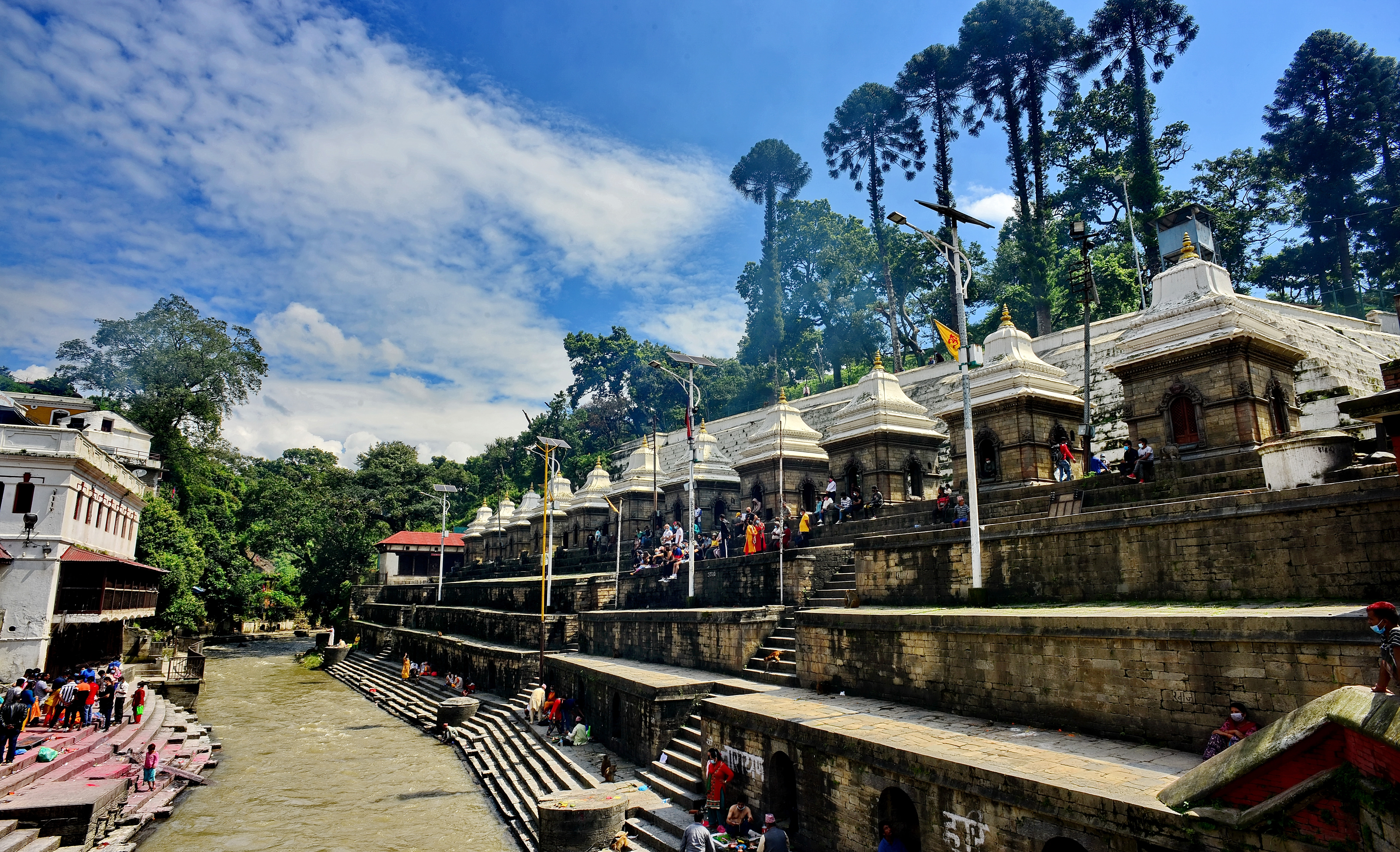
15 shivalayas

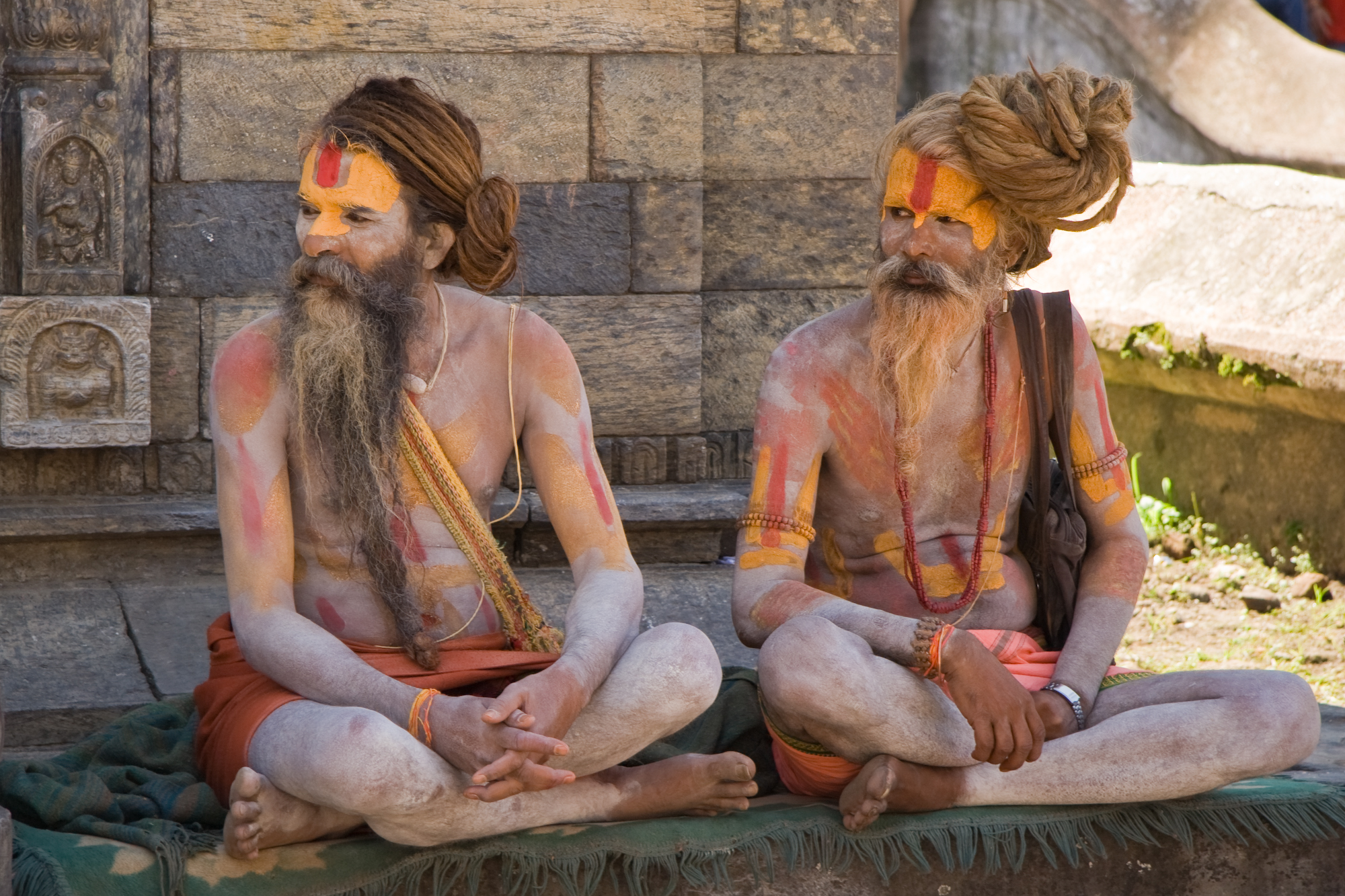
Wandering ascetics of Pashupatinath

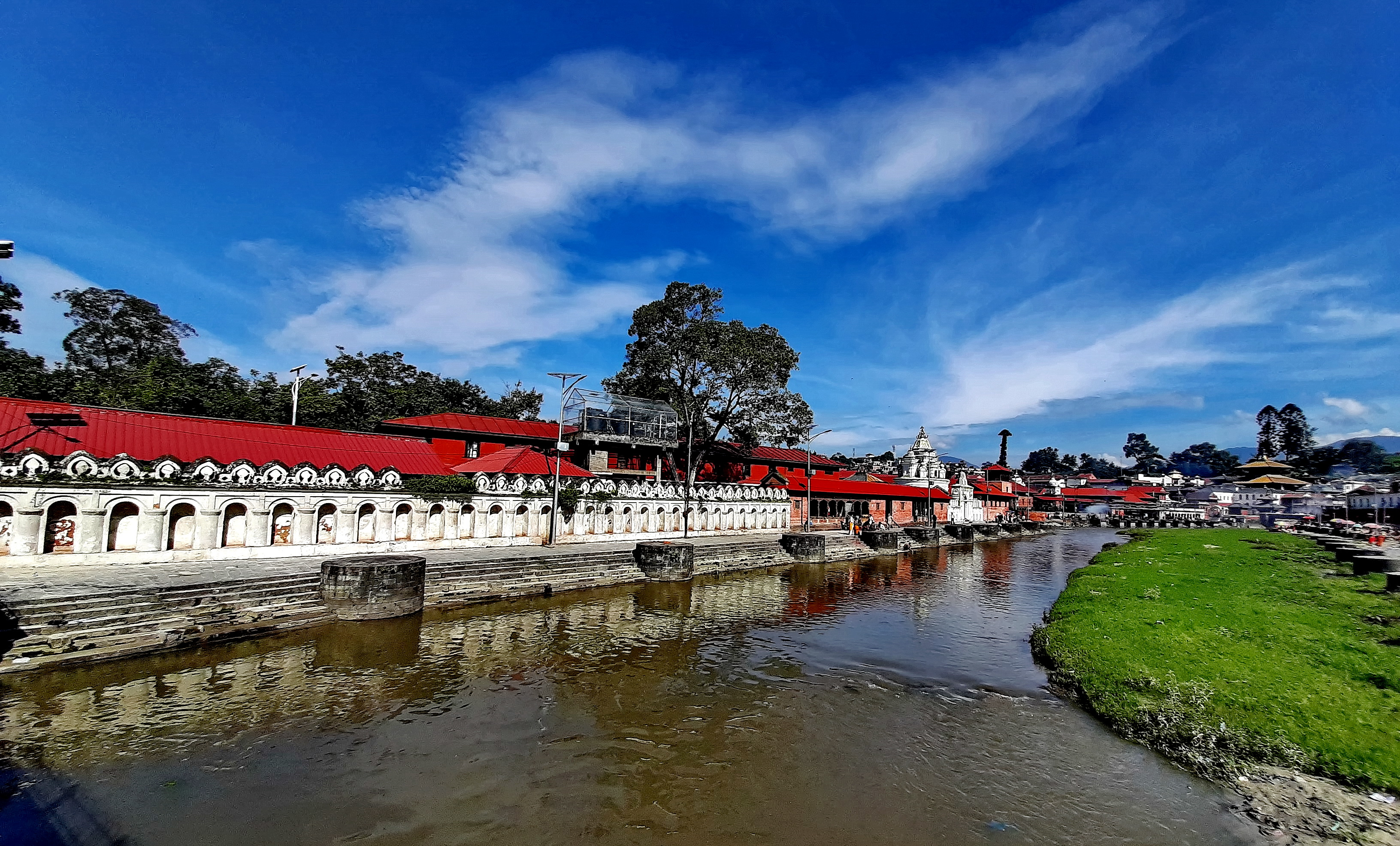
Bagmati river

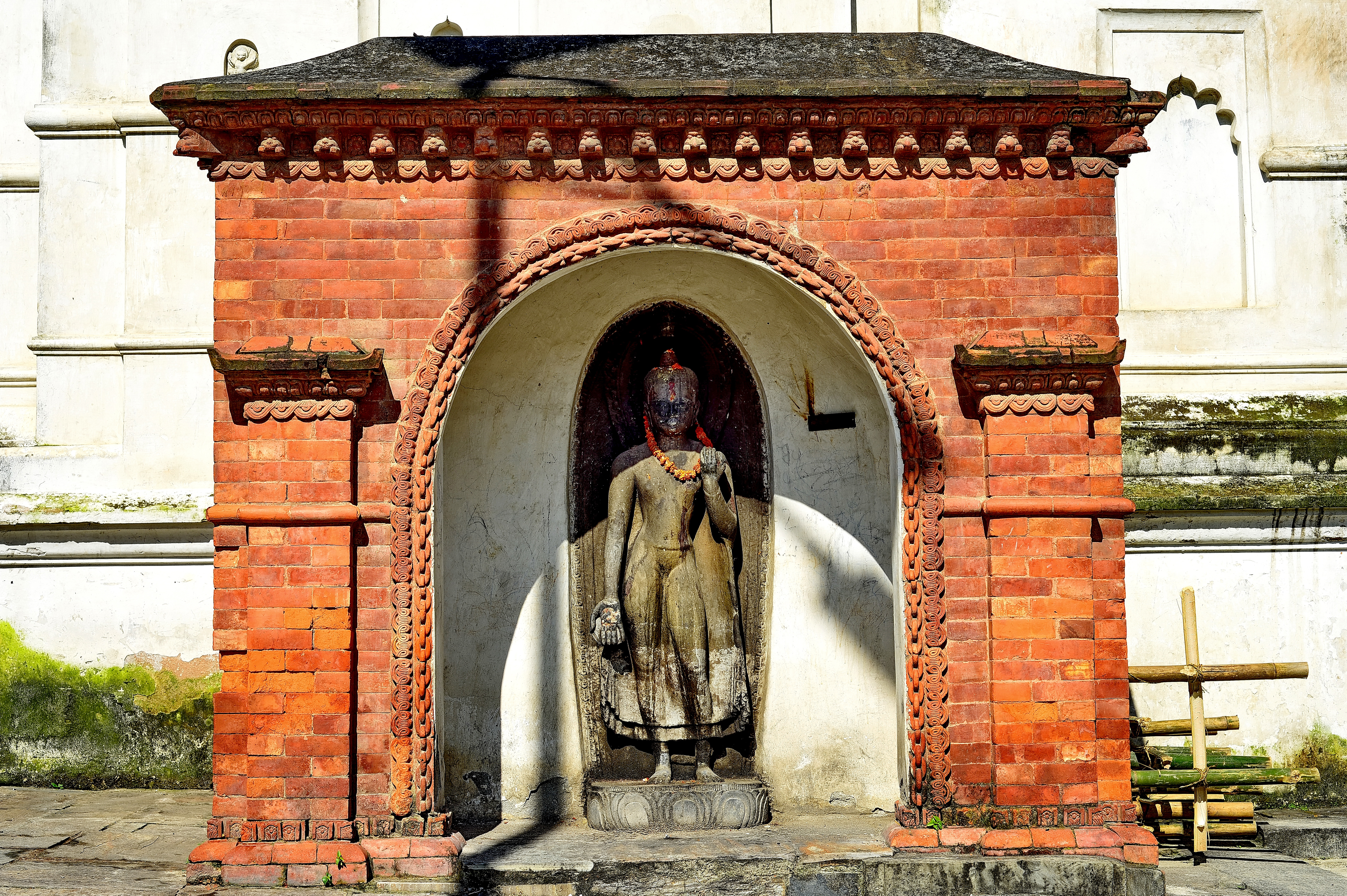
Buddha statue

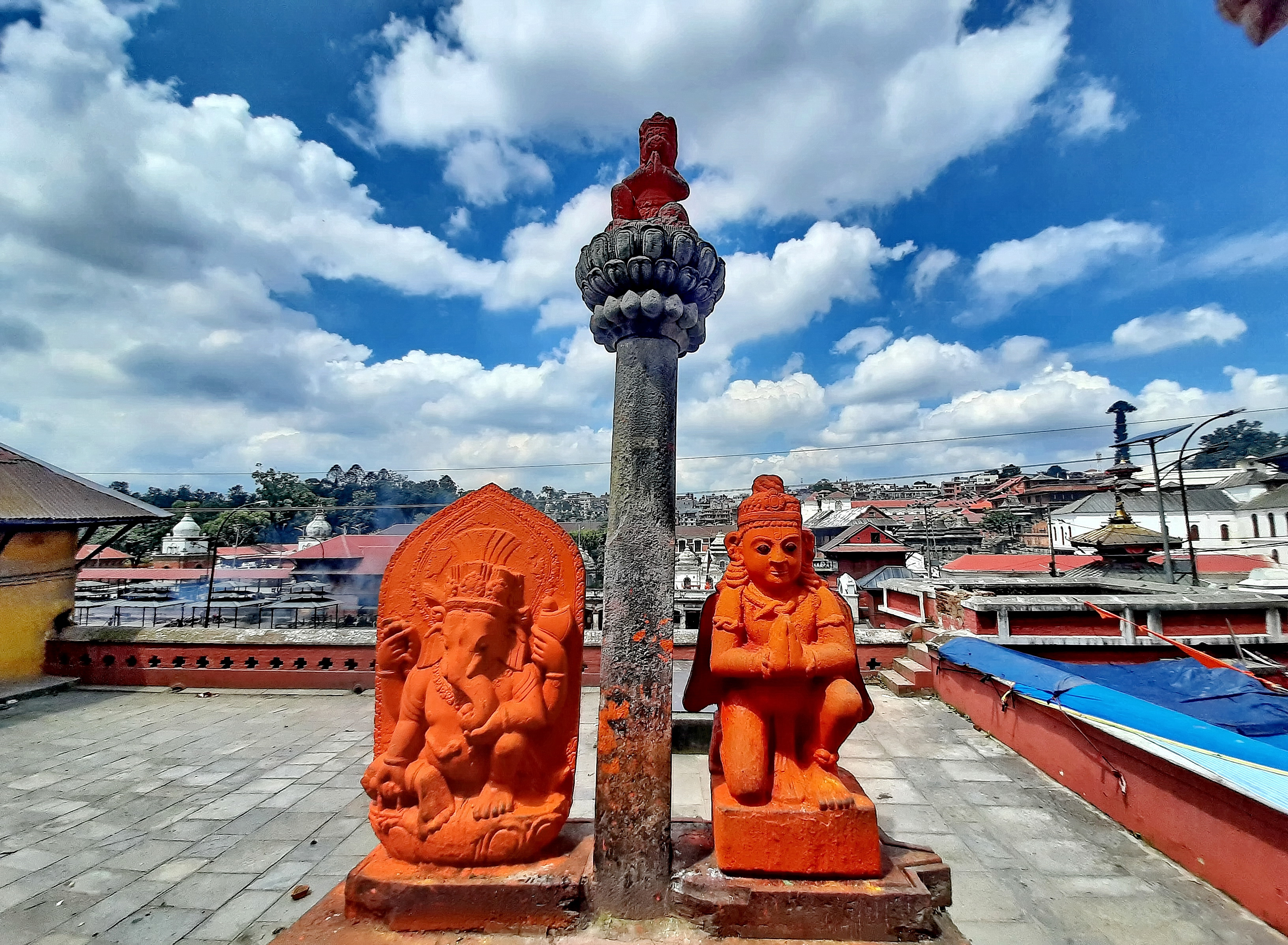
Ganesha and Garuda statue

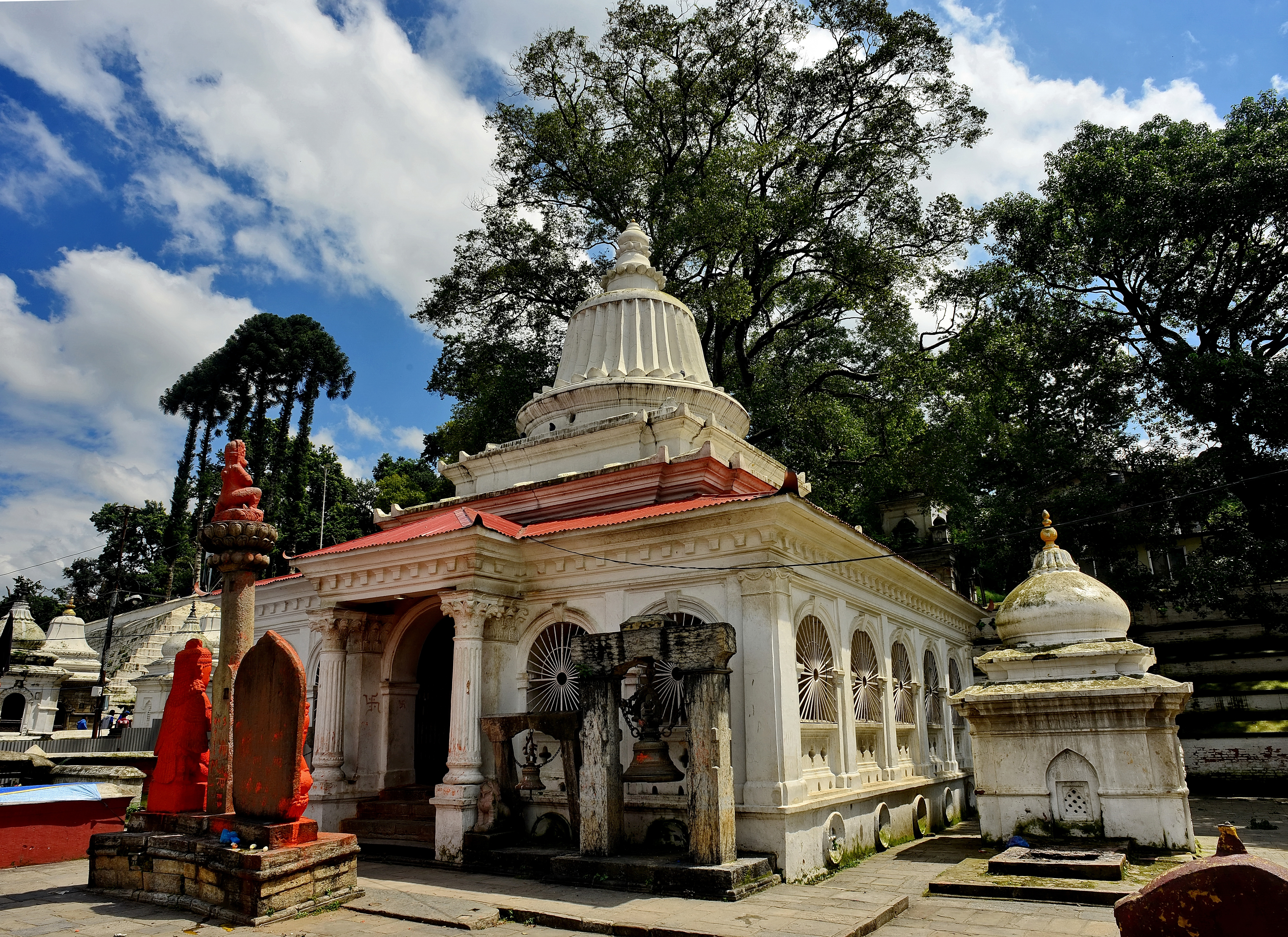
Vishnu temple (Ram Mandir)

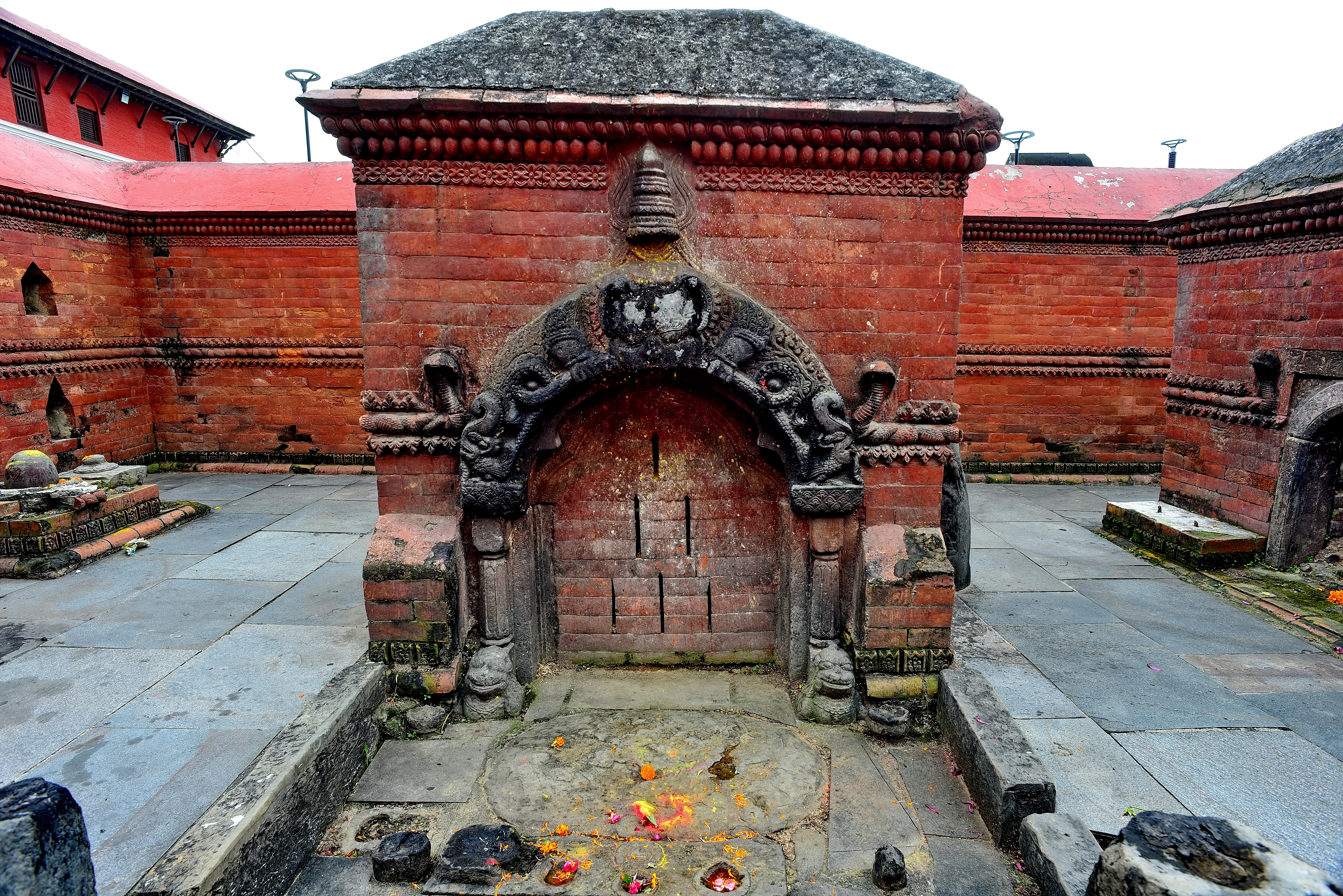
Goddess temple in Pashupatinath

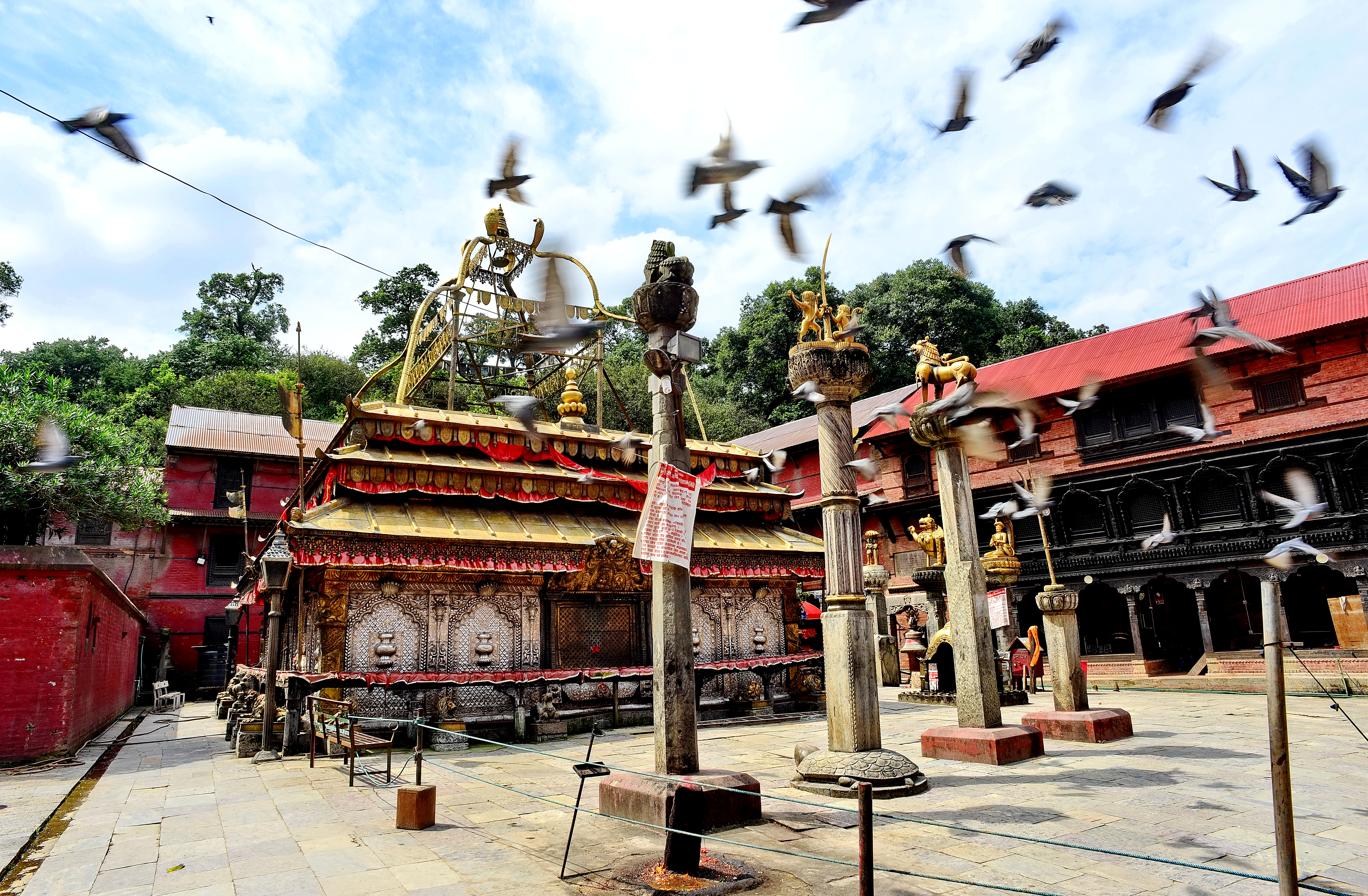
Goddess temple
