= Pati =

Pati may refer to:

== Locations ==
- Pati Regency, Indonesia
  - Pati, Pati, capital of Pati Regency
- Pati River, in Brazil
- Pati, Barwani, in India

== People ==
- Amitai Pati, New Zealand opera singer
- Martha Isabel Ruiz Corzo (born 1953), Mexican environmentalist nicknamed "Pati"
- Pene Pati, New Zealand opera singer

== Other ==
- Pati (title), an honorific
- Shital pati, a kind of mat used on beds or floors
- Pati (rest house), an architectural feature in Nepal

== See also ==
- Patti (disambiguation)
- Patricia, a given name
